= Huesca (Cortes of Aragon constituency) =

Coordinates: 42°10′N 2°10′W

- Cortes of Aragon; Electoral constituency
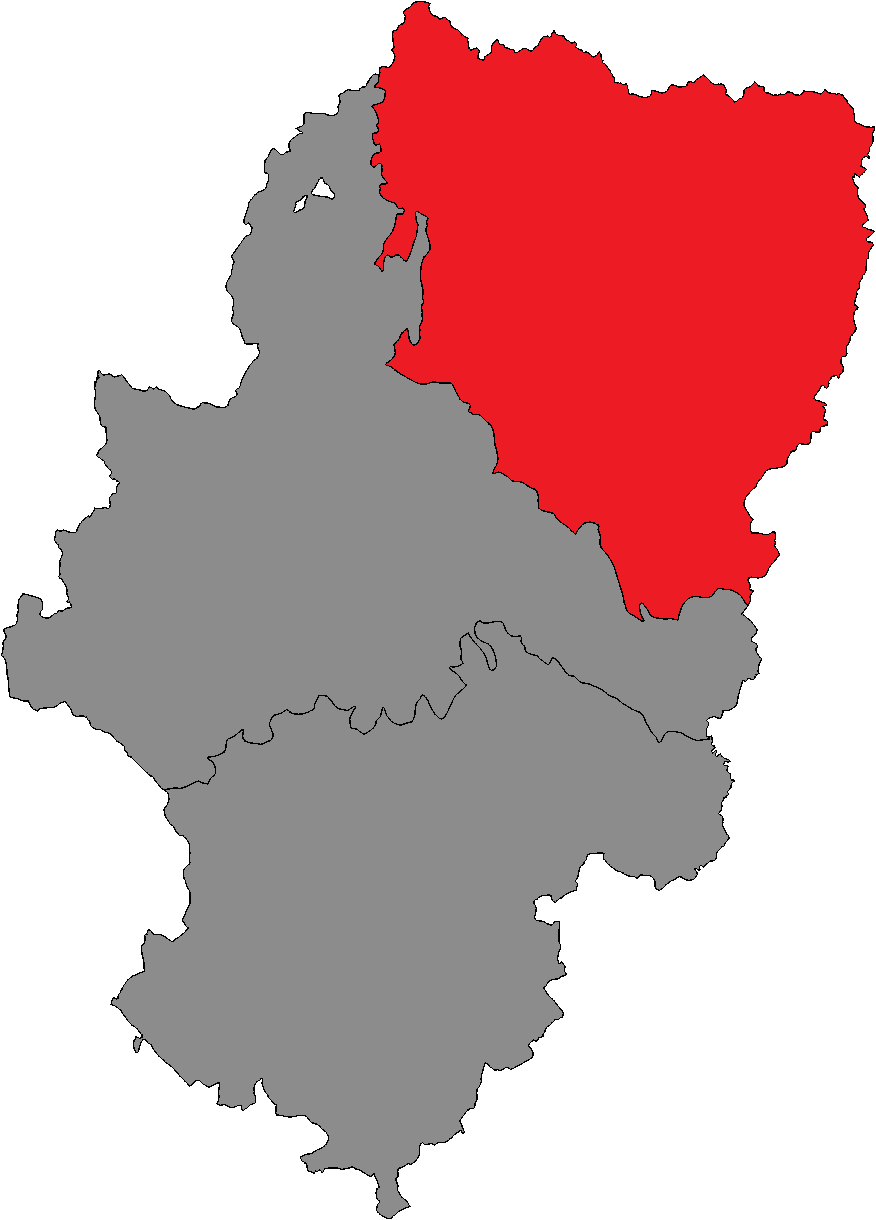
- Location of Huesca within Aragon
- Province: Huesca
- Autonomous community: Aragon
- Population: ▲230,624 (2025)
- Electorate: ▲175,188 (2026)
- Major settlements: Huesca

Current constituency
- Created: 1983
- Seats: 18
- Members: PP (7); PSOE (5); Vox (4); CHA (2)

Huesca is one of the three constituencies (Spanish: circunscripciones) represented in the Cortes of Aragon, the regional legislature of the Autonomous Community of Aragon. The constituency currently elects 18 deputies. Its boundaries correspond to those of the Spanish province of Huesca. The electoral system uses the D'Hondt method and closed-list proportional representation, with a minimum threshold of three percent.

== Electoral system ==
The constituency was established under the Statute of Autonomy of Aragon of 1982 and was first contested in the 1983 regional election. The Statute (reformed in 2007) provides for the three provinces in Aragon—Huesca, Teruel and Zaragoza—to be set as multi-member constituencies in the Cortes of Aragon, each of which is assigned an initial minimum of 14 seats—13 until 2023—and the remaining ones are distributed in proportion to population (with the seat-to-population ratio in the most populated province not exceeding three times—2.75 times until 2023—that of the least populated one). The exception was the 1983 election, when each constituency was allocated a fixed number of seats. Seats are elected using the D'Hondt method and closed-list proportional voting, with a three percent-threshold of valid votes (including blank ballots) in each constituency. The use of this electoral method may result in a higher effective threshold depending on district magnitude and vote distribution. The law does not provide for by-elections to fill vacant seats; instead, any vacancies arising after the proclamation of candidates and during the legislative term are filled by the next candidates on the party lists or, when required, by designated substitutes.

Voting is based on universal suffrage, comprising all Spanish nationals over 18 years of age, registered in the constituency and with full political rights. Amendments in 2011 required non-resident citizens to apply for voting, a system known as "begged" voting (Spanish: Voto rogado), which was abolished in 2022 and attributed responsibility for a major decrease in the turnout of Spaniards abroad during the years it was in force. Additionally, those legally incapacitated were also barred from voting before amendments in 2018 granted them the right to vote.

The electoral law allows for parties and federations registered in the interior ministry, alliances and groupings of electors to present lists of candidates. Parties and federations intending to form an alliance are required to inform the relevant electoral commission within 10 days of the election call—15 before 1985—whereas groupings of electors need to secure the signature of at least two percent of the electorate in the constituencies for which they seek election (before 1985 this was one permille, with a compulsory minimum of 500 signatures), disallowing electors from signing for more than one list. Amendments in 2007 required a balanced composition of men and women in the electoral lists, so that candidates of either sex made up at least 40 percent of the total composition; amendments in 2024 reinforced these through the use of a zipper system.

== Deputies ==
Deputies 1983–present
Key to parties IU CHA Podemos PSOE CDS PAR Cs PP CP AP Vox
Cortes	Election	Distribution
1st	1983	10 / 2 / 6
2nd	1987	1 / 7 / 2 / 5 / 3
3rd	1991	1 / 8 / 5 / 4
4th	1995	1 / 6 / 4 / 7
5th	1999	1 / 7 / 3 / 7
6th	2003	2 / 8 / 2 / 6
7th	2007	1 / 9 / 2 / 6
8th	2011	1 / 1 / 7 / 2 / 7
9th	2015	4 / 6 / 2 / 1 / 5
10th	2019	1 / 1 / 7 / 1 / 3 / 4 / 1
11th	2023	1 / 7 / 8 / 2
12th	2026	2 / 5 / 7 / 4

== Regional elections ==
=== 2026 ===
Summary of the 8 February 2026 Cortes of Aragon election results in Huesca
Parties and alliances	Popular vote			Seats	
Parties and alliances	Votes	%	±pp	Total	+/−
People's Party (PP)	35,029	32.67	−2.54	7	−1
Spanish Socialist Workers' Party (PSOE)	28,808	26.86	−3.27	5	−2
Vox (Vox)	20,061	18.71	+8.58	4	+2
Aragonese Union (CHA)^{1}	10,527	9.82	+3.33	2	+1
United Left–Unite Movement (IU–MS)	2,758	2.57	−0.03	0	±0
The Party is Over (SALF)	2,445	2.28	New	0	±0
Aragon Exists–Exists Coalition (Existe)	2,343	2.18	−1.01	0	±0
Aragonese Party (PAR)	1,402	1.31	−1.99	0	±0
We Can–Green Alliance (Podemos–AV)	893	0.83	−3.10	0	±0
Blank Seats to Leave Empty Seats (EB)	663	0.62	+0.10	0	±0
Animalist Party with the Environment (PACMA)	442	0.41	New	0	±0
Lower Cinca Between Everyone (ETXSBC)	228	0.21	−0.27	0	±0
Aragonese Coalition (Coalición Aragonesa)^{2}	109	0.10	−0.23	0	±0
For a Fairer World (M+J)	98	0.09	New	0	±0
Blank ballots	1,430	1.33	−0.82		
Total	107,236			18	±0
Valid votes	107,236	99.01	+0.51		
Invalid votes	1,073	0.99	−0.51		
Votes cast / turnout	108,309	61.82	−3.84		
Abstentions	66,879	38.18	+3.84		
Registered voters	175,188				
Sources
Footnotes: ^{1} Aragonese Union results are compared to the combined totals of Aragonese Union and Greens Equo in the 2023 election.; ^{2} Aragonese Coalition results are compared to the Federation of Independents of Aragon totals in the 2023 election.

=== 2023 ===
Summary of the 28 May 2023 Cortes of Aragon election results in Huesca
Parties and alliances	Popular vote			Seats	
Parties and alliances	Votes	%	±pp	Total	+/−
People's Party (PP)	39,484	35.21	+14.22	8	+4
Spanish Socialist Workers' Party (PSOE)	33,792	30.13	–3.56	7	±0
Vox (Vox)	11,362	10.13	+4.80	2	+1
Aragonese Union (CHA)	6,119	5.46	+0.91	1	±0
We Can–Green Alliance (Podemos–AV)	4,410	3.93	–4.32	0	–1
Aragonese Party (PAR)	3,696	3.30	–4.61	0	–1
Aragon Exists–Exists Coalition (Existe)	3,582	3.19	New	0	±0
United Left of Aragon (IU)	2,916	2.60	+0.22	0	±0
Citizens–You Aragon (CS–Tú Aragón)	1,723	1.54	–12.37	0	–3
Greens Equo (Equo)	1,156	1.03	New	0	±0
Blank Seats to Leave Empty Seats (EB)	579	0.52	+0.31	0	±0
Lower Cinca Between Everyone (ETXSBC)	541	0.48	New	0	±0
Federation of Independents of Aragon (FIA)	373	0.33	+0.26	0	±0
Blank ballots	2,409	2.15	+0.92		
Total	112,142			18	±0
Valid votes	112,142	98.50	–0.68		
Invalid votes	1,708	1.50	+0.68		
Votes cast / turnout	113,850	65.66	–0.55		
Abstentions	59,542	34.34	+0.55		
Registered voters	173,392				

=== 2019 ===
Summary of the 26 May 2019 Cortes of Aragon election results in Huesca
Parties and alliances	Popular vote			Seats	
Parties and alliances	Votes	%	±pp	Total	+/−
Spanish Socialist Workers' Party (PSOE)	38,185	33.69	+7.27	7	+1
People's Party (PP)	23,794	20.99	–5.22	4	–1
Citizens–Party of the Citizenry (Cs)	15,769	13.91	+5.51	3	+2
We Can–Equo (Podemos–Equo)^{1}	9,352	8.25	–10.73	1	–3
Aragonese Party (PAR)	8,960	7.91	–1.26	1	–1
Vox (Vox)	6,043	5.33	New	1	+1
Aragonese Union (CHA)	5,160	4.55	+1.44	1	+1
United Left of Aragon (IU)	2,701	2.38	–0.93	0	±0
Animalist Party Against Mistreatment of Animals (PACMA)	802	0.71	+0.15	0	±0
Upper Aragon in Common (AAeC)	728	0.64	New	0	±0
Blank Seats (EB)	241	0.21	–0.33	0	±0
Federation of Independents of Aragon (FIA)	74	0.07	+0.01	0	±0
Ñ Platform (PAÑ)	73	0.06	New	0	±0
Social Aragonese Movement (MAS)	56	0.05	New	0	±0
Blank ballots	1,397	1.23	–1.05		
Total	113,335			18	±0
Valid votes	113,335	99.18	+0.57		
Invalid votes	933	0.82	–0.57		
Votes cast / turnout	114,268	66.21	–0.51		
Abstentions	58,319	33.79	+0.51		
Registered voters	172,587				
Sources
Footnotes: ^{1} We Can–Equo results are compared to the combined totals of We Can and Equo in the 2015 election.

=== 2015 ===
Summary of the 24 May 2015 Cortes of Aragon election results in Huesca
Parties and alliances	Popular vote			Seats	
Parties and alliances	Votes	%	±pp	Total	+/−
Spanish Socialist Workers' Party (PSOE)	30,374	26.42	–7.09	6	–1
People's Party (PP)	30,135	26.21	–10.73	5	–2
We Can (Podemos)	21,387	18.60	New	4	+4
Aragonese Party (PAR)	10,538	9.17	–2.99	2	±0
Citizens–Party of the Citizenry (C's)	9,656	8.40	New	1	+1
United Left of Aragon (IU)	3,802	3.31	–1.40	0	–1
Aragonese Union (CHA)	3,573	3.11	–3.08	0	–1
Animalist Party Against Mistreatment of Animals (PACMA)	647	0.56	+0.23	0	±0
Union, Progress and Democracy (UPyD)	635	0.55	–0.73	0	±0
Blank Seats (EB)	623	0.54	New	0	±0
Equo (Equo)	438	0.38	New	0	±0
Zero Cuts (Recortes Cero)	147	0.13	+0.02	0	±0
Commitment with Aragon (CCA)	136	0.12	+0.01	0	±0
Communist Party of the Peoples of Spain (PCPE)	121	0.11	New	0	±0
Federation of Independents of Aragon (FIA)	72	0.06	–0.07	0	±0
Aragonese Bloc (BAR)	61	0.05	New	0	±0
Blank ballots	2,624	2.28	–1.04		
Total	114,969			18	±0
Valid votes	114,969	98.61	+0.24		
Invalid votes	1,620	1.39	–0.24		
Votes cast / turnout	116,589	66.72	–2.67		
Abstentions	58,143	33.28	+2.67		
Registered voters	174,732				

=== 2011 ===
Summary of the 22 May 2011 Cortes of Aragon election results in Huesca
Parties and alliances	Popular vote			Seats	
Parties and alliances	Votes	%	±pp	Total	+/−
People's Party (PP)	44,320	36.94	+7.72	7	+1
Spanish Socialist Workers' Party (PSOE)	40,209	33.51	–10.81	7	–2
Aragonese Party (PAR)	14,587	12.16	–0.58	2	±0
Aragonese Union (CHA)	7,430	6.19	–1.30	1	±0
United Left of Aragon (IU)	5,655	4.71	+1.59	1	+1
Union, Progress and Democracy (UPyD)	1,530	1.28	New	0	±0
Greens–Ecolo (V–Ecolo)^{1}	1,266	1.06	+0.27	0	±0
Anti-Bullfighting Party Against Mistreatment of Animals (PACMA)	398	0.33	New	0	±0
Federation of Independents of Aragon (FIA)	159	0.13	New	0	±0
Commitment with Aragon (CCA)	137	0.11	New	0	±0
Communist Unification of Spain (UCE)	127	0.11	New	0	±0
Liberal Democratic Centre (CDL)	96	0.08	New	0	±0
Aragonese Land (TA)	78	0.07	New	0	±0
Blank ballots	3,989	3.32	+1.20		
Total	119,981			18	±0
Valid votes	119,981	98.37	–0.91		
Invalid votes	1,988	1.63	+0.91		
Votes cast / turnout	121,969	69.39	–0.38		
Abstentions	53,814	30.61	+0.38		
Registered voters	175,783				
Sources
Footnotes: ^{1} Greens–Ecolo results are compared to The Greens–Federation of Independents of Aragon totals in the 2007 election.

=== 2007 ===
Summary of the 27 May 2007 Cortes of Aragon election results in Huesca
Parties and alliances	Popular vote			Seats	
Parties and alliances	Votes	%	±pp	Total	+/−
Spanish Socialist Workers' Party (PSOE)	54,128	44.32	+1.91	9	+1
People's Party (PP)	35,694	29.22	–0.50	6	±0
Aragonese Party (PAR)	15,560	12.74	+0.45	2	±0
Aragonese Union (CHA)	9,151	7.49	–2.46	1	–1
United Left of Aragon (IU)	3,812	3.12	+0.53	0	±0
The Greens–Federation of Independents of Aragon (LV–FIA)^{1}	967	0.79	+0.06	0	±0
Family and Life Party (PFyV)	238	0.19	+0.03	0	±0
Blank ballots	2,587	2.12	+0.14		
Total	122,137			18	±0
Valid votes	122,137	99.28	+0.01		
Invalid votes	884	0.72	–0.01		
Votes cast / turnout	123,021	69.77	–2.01		
Abstentions	53,302	30.23	+2.01		
Registered voters	176,323				
Sources
Footnotes: ^{1} The Greens–Federation of Independents of Aragon results are compared to The Greens–SOS Nature totals in the 2003 election.

=== 2003 ===
Summary of the 25 May 2003 Cortes of Aragon election results in Huesca
Parties and alliances	Popular vote			Seats	
Parties and alliances	Votes	%	±pp	Total	+/−
Spanish Socialist Workers' Party (PSOE)	53,486	42.41	+8.26	8	+1
People's Party (PP)	37,479	29.72	–4.08	6	–1
Aragonese Party (PAR)	15,497	12.29	–3.78	2	–1
Aragonese Union (CHA)	12,550	9.95	+0.94	2	+1
United Left of Aragon (IU)	3,269	2.59	–0.82	0	±0
The Greens–SOS Nature (LV–SOS)^{1}	923	0.73	–0.04	0	±0
Aragonese Initiative (INAR)	207	0.16	New	0	±0
Family and Life Party (PFyV)	206	0.16	New	0	±0
Blank ballots	2,499	1.98	–0.38		
Total	126,116			18	±0
Valid votes	126,116	99.27	+0.12		
Invalid votes	931	0.73	–0.12		
Votes cast / turnout	127,047	71.78	+4.56		
Abstentions	49,951	28.22	–4.56		
Registered voters	176,998				
Sources
Footnotes: ^{1} The Greens–SOS Nature results are compared to SOS Nature totals in the 1999 election.

=== 1999 ===
Summary of the 13 June 1999 Cortes of Aragon election results in Huesca
Parties and alliances	Popular vote			Seats	
Parties and alliances	Votes	%	±pp	Total	+/−
Spanish Socialist Workers' Party (PSOE)	40,709	34.15	+2.42	7	+1
People's Party (PP)	40,293	33.80	+0.58	7	±0
Aragonese Party (PAR)	19,150	16.07	–5.36	3	–1
Aragonese Union (CHA)	10,739	9.01	+4.93	1	+1
United Left of Aragon (IU)	4,065	3.41	–3.43	0	–1
SOS Nature (SOS)	912	0.77	+0.04	0	±0
Upper Aragonese Territory Regenerationist Group (ARTA)	373	0.31	New	0	±0
Humanist Party (PH)	149	0.12	New	0	±0
Blank ballots	2,811	2.36	+0.71		
Total	119,201			18	±0
Valid votes	119,201	99.15	–0.18		
Invalid votes	1,018	0.85	+0.18		
Votes cast / turnout	120,219	67.22	–5.24		
Abstentions	58,624	32.78	+5.24		
Registered voters	178,843				

=== 1995 ===
Summary of the 28 May 1995 Cortes of Aragon election results in Huesca
Parties and alliances	Popular vote			Seats	
Parties and alliances	Votes	%	±pp	Total	+/−
People's Party (PP)	41,878	33.22	+12.96	7	+3
Spanish Socialist Workers' Party (PSOE)	39,997	31.73	–7.72	6	–2
Aragonese Party (PAR)	27,017	21.43	–3.90	4	–1
United Left of Aragon (IU)	8,618	6.84	+0.20	1	±0
Aragonese Union (CHA)	5,141	4.08	+0.96	0	±0
SOS Nature (SOS)	923	0.73	New	0	±0
Platform of Independents of Spain (PIE)	264	0.21	New	0	±0
Aragonese Unity (UA)	151	0.12	New	0	±0
Blank ballots	2,078	1.65	+0.41		
Total	126,067			18	±0
Valid votes	126,067	99.33	+0.16		
Invalid votes	853	0.67	–0.16		
Votes cast / turnout	126,920	72.46	+3.80		
Abstentions	48,242	27.54	–3.80		
Registered voters	175,162				

=== 1991 ===
Summary of the 26 May 1991 Cortes of Aragon election results in Huesca
Parties and alliances	Popular vote			Seats	
Parties and alliances	Votes	%	±pp	Total	+/−
Spanish Socialist Workers' Party (PSOE)	45,776	39.45	+4.65	8	+1
Aragonese Party (PAR)	29,391	25.33	+0.10	5	±0
People's Party (PP)^{1}	23,507	20.26	+3.36	4	+1
Aragon Alternative Convergence–United Left (CAA–IU)	7,710	6.64	+1.47	1	±0
Democratic and Social Centre (CDS)	4,055	3.49	–8.39	0	–2
Aragonese Union (CHA)	3,616	3.12	+1.36	0	±0
Workers' Socialist Party (PST)	548	0.47	New	0	±0
Blank ballots	1,441	1.24	–0.23		
Total	116,044			18	±0
Valid votes	116,044	99.17	+0.57		
Invalid votes	969	0.83	–0.57		
Votes cast / turnout	117,013	68.66	–1.52		
Abstentions	53,400	31.34	+1.52		
Registered voters	170,413				
Sources
Footnotes: ^{1} People's Party results are compared to the combined totals of People's Alliance and People's Democratic Party–Centrists of Aragon in the 1987 election.

=== 1987 ===
Summary of the 10 June 1987 Cortes of Aragon election results in Huesca
Parties and alliances	Popular vote			Seats	
Parties and alliances	Votes	%	±pp	Total	+/−
Spanish Socialist Workers' Party (PSOE)	42,097	36.12	–12.94	7	–3
Regionalist Aragonese Party (PAR)	29,409	25.23	+12.12	5	+3
People's Alliance (AP)^{1}	17,675	15.17	n/a	3	–1
Democratic and Social Centre (CDS)	13,851	11.88	+8.22	2	+2
Aragon Alternative Convergence–United Left (CAA–IU)^{2}	6,030	5.17	+0.66	1	+1
Aragonese Union (UA/CHA)	2,047	1.76	New	0	±0
People's Democratic Party–Centrists of Aragon (PDP)^{1}	2,017	1.73	n/a	0	–2
Workers' Party of Spain–Communist Unity (PTE–UC)	961	0.82	New	0	±0
Humanist Platform (PH)	425	0.36	New	0	±0
Republican Popular Unity (UPR)	319	0.27	New	0	±0
Blank ballots	1,714	1.47	+0.79		
Total	116,545			18	±0
Valid votes	116,545	98.60	+0.30		
Invalid votes	1,658	1.40	–0.30		
Votes cast / turnout	118,203	70.18	+0.96		
Abstentions	50,228	29.82	–0.96		
Registered voters	168,431				
Sources
Footnotes: ^{1} Within the People's Coalition alliance in the 1983 election.; ^{2} Aragon Alternative Convergence–United Left results are compared to Communist Party of Spain totals in the 1983 election.

=== 1983 ===
Summary of the 8 May 1983 Cortes of Aragon election results in Huesca
Parties and alliances	Popular vote			Seats	
Parties and alliances	Votes	%	±pp	Total	+/−
Spanish Socialist Workers' Party (PSOE)	57,033	49.06	n/a	10	n/a
People's Coalition (AP–PDP–UL)	31,470	27.07	n/a	6	n/a
Regionalist Aragonese Party (PAR)	15,242	13.11	n/a	2	n/a
Communist Party of Spain (PCE)	5,243	4.51	n/a	0	n/a
Democratic and Social Centre (CDS)	4,252	3.66	n/a	0	n/a
Liberal Democratic Party (PDL)	1,341	1.15	n/a	0	n/a
Workers' Socialist Party (PST)	883	0.76	n/a	0	n/a
Blank ballots	787	0.68	n/a		
Total	116,251			18	n/a
Valid votes	116,251	98.30	n/a		
Invalid votes	2,016	1.70	n/a		
Votes cast / turnout	118,267	69.22	n/a		
Abstentions	52,592	30.78	n/a		
Registered voters	170,859				

== Bibliography ==
- Real Decreto-ley 20/1977, de 18 de marzo, sobre Normas Electorales (Royal Decree-Law 20/1977). Official State Gazette (in Spanish). 18 March 1977. BOE-A-1977-7445.
- Ley Orgánica 8/1982, de 10 de agosto, de Estatuto de Autonomía de Aragón (Organic Law 8/1982). Official State Gazette (in Spanish). 10 August 1982. BOE-A-1982-20819.
- Decreto 24/83, de 9 de marzo, de la Diputación General de Aragón por el que se convocan elecciones a Cortes de Aragón (Decree). Official Gazette of Aragon (in Spanish). 10 March 1983.
- Ley Orgánica 5/1985, de 19 de junio, del Régimen Electoral General (Organic Law 5/1985). Official State Gazette (in Spanish). 19 June 1985. BOE-A-1985-11672.
- Ley 2/1987, de 16 de febrero, Electoral de la Comunidad Autónoma de Aragón (Law 2/1987). Official State Gazette (in Spanish). 16 February 1987. BOE-A-1987-5339.
- Ley Orgánica 5/2007, de 20 de abril, de reforma del Estatuto de Autonomía de Aragón (Organic Law 5/2007). Official State Gazette (in Spanish). 20 April 2007. BOE-A-2007-8444.
