= 2007 Aragonese regional election =

Election in the Spanish region of Aragon

- 27 May 2007

All 67 seats in the Cortes of Aragon 34 seats needed for a majority
- Opinion polls
- Registered: 1,017,085 ▼0.2%
- Turnout: 676,491 (66.5%) ▼3.9 pp
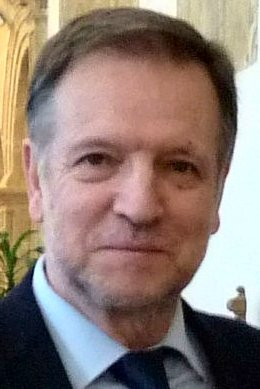

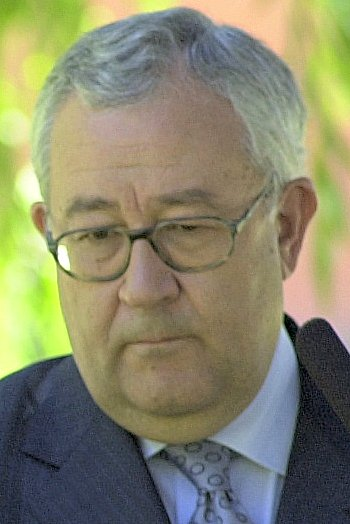

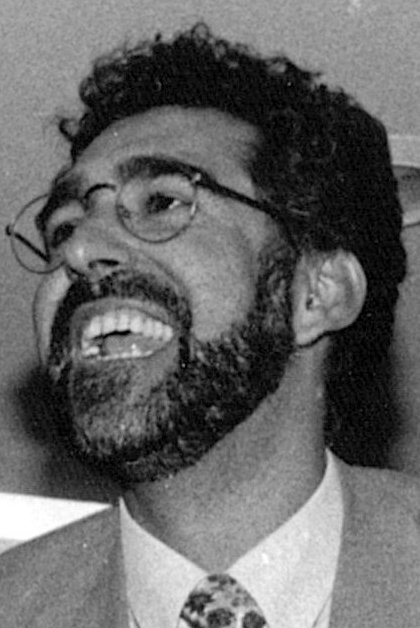

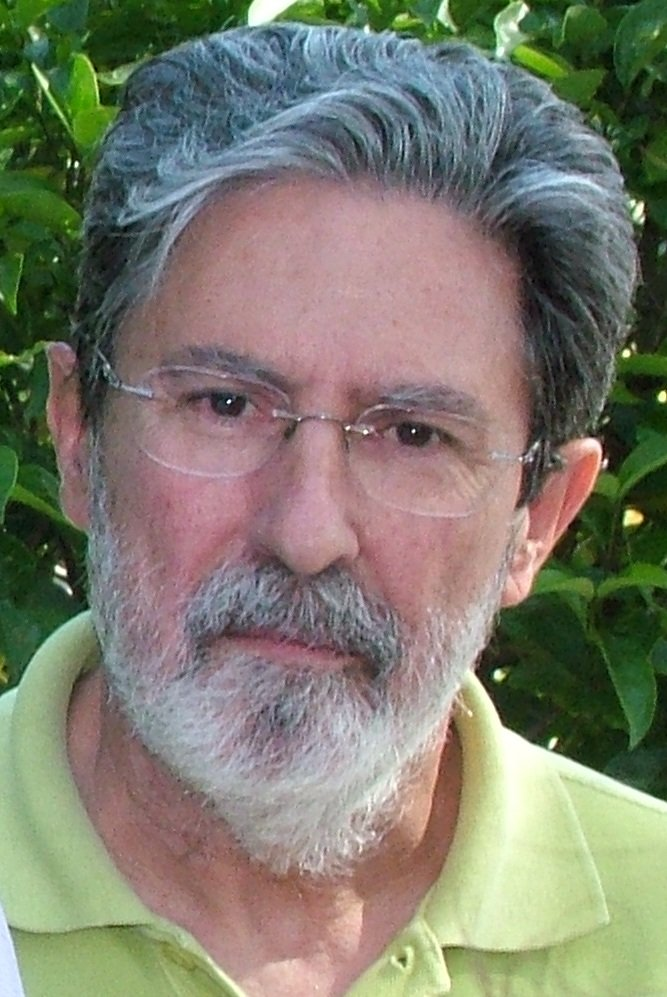
	First party	Second party	Third party
Leader	Marcelino Iglesias	Gustavo Alcalde	José Ángel Biel
Party	PSOE	PP	PAR
Leader since	15 February 1995	18 May 2001	2 June 2000
Leader's seat	Zaragoza	Zaragoza	Zaragoza
Last election	27 seats, 37.9%	22 seats, 30.7%	8 seats, 11.2%
Seats won	30	23	9
Seat change	▲3	▲1	▲1
Popular vote	276,415	208,642	81,135
Percentage	41.1%	31.1%	12.1%
Swing	▲3.2 pp	▲0.4 pp	▲0.9 pp
	Fourth party	Fifth party
Leader	Chesús Bernal	Adolfo Barrena
Party	CHA	IU
Leader since	29 June 1986	May 2002
Leader's seat	Zaragoza	Zaragoza
Last election	9 seats, 13.7%	1 seat, 3.1%
Seats won	4	1
Seat change	▼5	0
Popular vote	54,752	27,440
Percentage	8.1%	4.1%
Swing	▼5.6 pp	▲1.0 pp
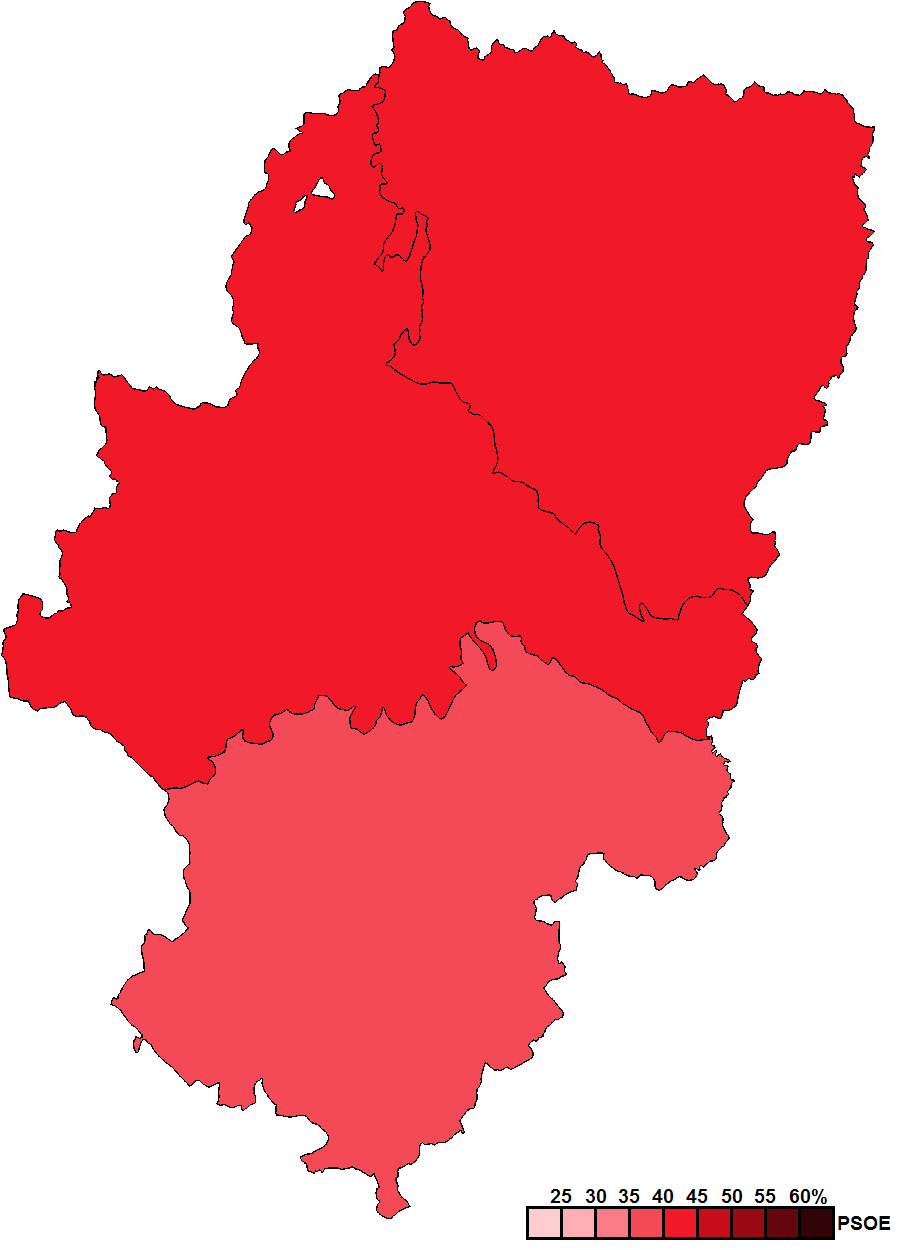
- Constituency results map for the Cortes of Aragon
President before election
Marcelino Iglesias
PSOE
President after election
Marcelino Iglesias
PSOE

A regional election was held in Aragon on 27 May 2007 to elect the 7th Cortes of the autonomous community. All 67 seats in the Cortes were up for election. It was held concurrently with regional elections in twelve other autonomous communities and local elections all across Spain.

The Spanish Socialist Workers' Party (PSOE), which had ruled Aragon since the 1999 election, saw an increase of three seats and obtained its best result since the 1983 election in terms of votes received. The People's Party (PP) also managed to slightly increase its vote share and gained one seat. On the other hand, the Aragonese Union (CHA) lost ground for the first time, losing 5 of its 9 seats and falling behind the Aragonese Party (PAR), which regained third place and increased its vote share for the first time since the 1987 election. United Left (IU) held its single seat and increased its vote share for the first time since 1995.

The PSOE and PAR renewed their coalition administration for a third consecutive time, resulting in Marcelino Iglesias being re-elected as regional President for a third term in office.

== Overview ==
Under the 2007 Statute of Autonomy, the Cortes of Aragon was the unicameral legislature of the homonymous autonomous community, having legislative power in devolved matters, as well as the ability to grant or withdraw confidence from a regional president. The electoral and procedural rules were supplemented by national law provisions.

=== Date ===
The term of the Cortes of Aragon expired four years after the date of its previous election. Amendments earlier in 2007 abolished fixed-term elections, instead allowing the term of the Cortes to expire after an early dissolution. The election decree was required to be issued no later than 25 days before the scheduled expiration date of parliament and published on the following day in the Official Gazette of Aragon (BOA), with election day taking place 54 days after the decree's publication. The previous election was held on 25 May 2003, which meant that the chamber's term would have expired on 25 May 2007. The election decree was required to be published in the BOA no later than 1 May 2007, setting the latest possible date for election day on 24 June 2007.

The regional president had the prerogative to dissolve the Cortes of Aragon at any given time and call a snap election, provided that no motion of no confidence was in process and that dissolution did not occur before one year after a previous one. In the event of an investiture process failing to elect a regional president within a two-month period from the Cortes's reconvening, the chamber was to be automatically dissolved and a fresh election called.

The election to the Cortes of Aragon was officially called on 3 April 2007 with the publication of the corresponding decree in the BOA, setting election day for 27 May and scheduling for the chamber to reconvene on 21 June.

=== Electoral system ===
Voting for the Cortes was based on universal suffrage, comprising all Spanish nationals over 18 years of age, registered in Aragon and with full political rights, provided that they had not been deprived of the right to vote by a final sentence, nor were legally incapacitated.

The Cortes of Aragon had a minimum of 65 and a maximum of 80 seats, with electoral provisions fixing its size at 67. All were elected in three multi-member constituencies—corresponding to the provinces of Huesca, Teruel and Zaragoza, each of which was assigned an initial minimum of 13 seats and the remaining 28 distributed in proportion to population (with the seat-to-population ratio in the most populated province not exceeding 2.75 times that of the least populated one)—using the D'Hondt method and closed-list proportional voting, with a three percent-threshold of valid votes (including blank ballots) in each constituency. The use of this electoral method resulted in a higher effective threshold depending on district magnitude and vote distribution.

As a result of the aforementioned allocation, each Cortes constituency was entitled the following seats:

Seats	Constituencies
35	Zaragoza
18	Huesca
14	Teruel

The law did not provide for by-elections to fill vacant seats; instead, any vacancies arising after the proclamation of candidates and during the legislative term were filled by the next candidates on the party lists or, when required, by designated substitutes.

=== Outgoing parliament ===
The table below shows the composition of the parliamentary groups in the chamber at the time of the election call.

Parliamentary composition in April 2007
Groups	Parties	Legislators	
Groups	Parties	Seats	Total
Socialist Parliamentary Group	PSOE	27	27
People's Parliamentary Group in the Cortes of Aragon	PP	22	22
Aragonese Union Parliamentary Group	CHA	9	9
Aragonese Party's Parliamentary Group	PAR	8	8
Mixed Parliamentary Group	IU	1	1

== Parties and candidates ==
The electoral law allowed for parties and federations registered in the interior ministry, alliances and groupings of electors to present lists of candidates. Parties and federations intending to form an alliance were required to inform the relevant electoral commission within 10 days of the election call, whereas groupings of electors needed to secure the signature of at least one percent of the electorate in the constituencies for which they sought election, disallowing electors from signing for more than one list. Amendments earlier in 2007 required a balanced composition of men and women in the electoral lists, so that candidates of either sex made up at least 40 percent of the total composition.

Below is a list of the main parties and alliances which contested the election:

Candidacy	Parties and alliances	Leading candidate	Ideology	Previous result		Gov.	Ref.
Candidacy	Parties and alliances	Leading candidate	Ideology	Vote %	Seats	Gov.	Ref.
PSOE	List: Spanish Socialist Workers' Party (PSOE)	Marcelino Iglesias	Social democracy	37.9%	27	Yes	
PP	List: People's Party (PP)	Gustavo Alcalde	Conservatism; Christian democracy	30.7%	22	No	
CHA	List: Aragonese Union (CHA)	Chesús Bernal	Aragonese nationalism Eco-socialism	13.7%	9	No	
PAR	List: Aragonese Party (PAR)	José Ángel Biel	Regionalism; Centrism	11.2%	8	Yes	
IU	List: United Left of Aragon (IU) – Communist Party of Aragon (PCE–A) – Revolutionary Workers' Party (POR)	Adolfo Barrena	Socialism; Communism	3.1%	1	No	

== Opinion polls ==
The tables below list opinion polling results in reverse chronological order, showing the most recent first and using the dates when the survey fieldwork was done, as opposed to the date of publication. Where the fieldwork dates are unknown, the date of publication is given instead. The highest percentage figure in each polling survey is displayed with its background shaded in the leading party's colour. If a tie ensues, this is applied to the figures with the highest percentages. The "Lead" column on the right shows the percentage-point difference between the parties with the highest percentages in a poll.

=== Voting intention estimates ===
The table below lists weighted voting intention estimates. Refusals are generally excluded from the party vote percentages, while question wording and the treatment of "don't know" responses and those not intending to vote may vary between polling organisations. When available, seat projections determined by the polling organisations are displayed below (or in place of) the percentages in a smaller font; 34 seats were required for an absolute majority in the Cortes of Aragon.

Color key:

Exit poll

Polling firm/Commissioner	Fieldwork date	Sample size	Turnout	PSOE	PP	CHA	PAR	IU	Lead
2007 regional election	27 May 2007	—N/a	66.5	41.1; 30	31.1; 23	8.1; 4	12.1; 9	4.1; 1	10.0
Ipsos/RTVE–FORTA	27 May 2007	?	?	? 31/34	? 20/23	? 4/5	? 6/7	? 2/3	?
A+M/Heraldo de Aragón	20 May 2007	?	?	37.8; 26	33.1; 23	11.0; 8	12.8; 9	3.6; 1	4.7
Celeste-Tel/Terra	9–15 May 2007	?	?	41.2; 29/30	28.4; 21/22	11.5; 7	10.6; 8	4.2; 1	12.8
C&J/El Periódico	7–12 May 2007	?	?	39.4; 27	34.0; 23	10.9; 7	12.7; 9	3.0; 1	5.4
Sigma Dos/El Mundo	27 Apr–8 May 2007	850	?	41.4; 28/30	32.0; 22/24	10.9; 7	9.3; 7	3.4; 1	9.4
CIS	9 Apr–6 May 2007	1,538	?	42.0; 30/31	27.9; 21	11.9; 6/7	10.7; 8	4.3; 1	14.1
A+M/DGA	3–11 Feb 2007	2,586	67.0	36.1; 27	31.0; 23	15.8; 8	11.8; 8	4.2; 1	5.1
Sigma Dos/El Mundo	16–24 Nov 2006	?	?	? 27/29	? 24/26	? 6	? 7	? 1	?
2004 EP election	13 Jun 2004	—N/a	47.3	45.8 (33)	40.0 (30)	6.1 (3)	2.9 (0)	3.1 (1)	5.8
2004 general election	14 Mar 2004	—N/a	77.0	41.3 (31)	36.5 (27)	12.1 (6)	4.7 (3)	2.8 (0)	4.8
2003 regional election	25 May 2003	—N/a	70.4	37.9; 27	30.7; 22	13.7; 9	11.2; 8	3.1; 1	7.2

=== Voting preferences ===
The table below lists raw, unweighted voting preferences.

Polling firm/Commissioner	Fieldwork date	Sample size	PSOE	PP	CHA	PAR	IU	Question	X mark	Lead
2007 regional election (Note: Does not include non-resident citizens.)	27 May 2007	—N/a	27.7	21.0	5.5	8.2	2.8	—N/a	32.0	6.7
CIS	9 Apr–6 May 2007	1,538	24.5	11.2	3.3	4.4	2.1	41.6	10.6	13.3
A+M/DGA	3–11 Feb 2007	2,586	24.2	16.6	5.7	4.5	2.9	29.6	11.5	7.6
2004 EP election	13 Jun 2004	—N/a	21.8	19.1	2.9	1.4	1.5	—N/a	52.1	2.7
2004 general election	14 Mar 2004	—N/a	32.0	28.3	9.4	3.6	2.2	—N/a	22.0	3.7
2003 regional election	25 May 2003	—N/a	26.9	21.8	9.7	7.9	2.2	—N/a	28.7	5.1

=== Victory preferences ===
The table below lists opinion polling on the victory preferences for each party in the event of a regional election taking place.

Polling firm/Commissioner	Fieldwork date	Sample size	PSOE	PP	CHA	PAR	IU	Other/ None	Question	Lead
CIS	9 Apr–6 May 2007	1,538	36.3	16.6	4.5	6.0	2.3	9.4	24.8	19.7

=== Victory likelihood ===
The table below lists opinion polling on the perceived likelihood of victory for each party in the event of a regional election taking place.

Polling firm/Commissioner	Fieldwork date	Sample size	PSOE	PP	CHA	PAR	IU	Other/ None	Question	Lead
CIS	9 Apr–6 May 2007	1,538	53.7	8.0	0.5	1.6	0.0	0.9	35.2	45.7

=== Preferred President ===
The table below lists opinion polling on leader preferences to become president of the Government of Aragon.

Polling firm/Commissioner	Fieldwork date	Sample size						Other/ None/ Not care	Question	Lead
Polling firm/Commissioner	Fieldwork date	Sample size	Iglesias PSOE	Alcalde PP	Bernal CHA	Biel PAR	Barrena IU	Other/ None/ Not care	Question	Lead
CIS	9 Apr–6 May 2007	1,538	37.0	11.4	3.9	7.2	1.7	1.7	37.0	25.6
A+M/DGA	3–11 Feb 2007	2,586	35.8	10.9	5.0	3.6	1.9	3.4	38.8	24.9

== Results ==
=== Overall ===
← Summary of the 27 May 2007 Cortes of Aragon election results →
Parties and alliances	Popular vote			Seats	
Parties and alliances	Votes	%	±pp	Total	+/−
Spanish Socialist Workers' Party (PSOE)	276,415	41.14	+3.20	30	+3
People's Party (PP)	208,642	31.06	+0.33	23	+1
Aragonese Party (PAR)	81,135	12.08	+0.90	9	+1
Aragonese Union (CHA)	54,752	8.15	−5.56	4	−5
United Left of Aragon (IU)	27,440	4.08	+1.02	1	±0
The Greens–Federation of Independents of Aragon (LV–FIA)^{1}	4,417	0.66	+0.06	0	±0
Aragon United Citizens Party (pCUA)	2,463	0.37	New	0	±0
Family and Life Party (PFyV)	1,105	0.16	−0.02	0	±0
Humanist Party (PH)	577	0.09	+0.04	0	±0
Blank ballots	14,890	2.22	+0.13		
Total	671,836			67	±0
Valid votes	671,836	99.31	−0.05		
Invalid votes	4,655	0.69	+0.05		
Votes cast / turnout	676,491	66.51	−3.85		
Abstentions	340,594	33.49	+3.85		
Registered voters	1,017,085				
Sources
Footnotes: ^{1} The Greens–Federation of Independents of Aragon results are compared to The Greens–SOS Nature totals in the 2003 election.

Popular vote
PSOE	41.14%
PP	31.06%
PAR	12.08%
CHA	8.15%
IU	4.08%
Others	1.27%
Blank ballots	2.22%

Seats
PSOE	44.78%
PP	34.33%
PAR	13.43%
CHA	5.97%
IU	1.49%

=== Distribution by constituency ===
Constituency	PSOE		PP		PAR		CHA		IU	
Constituency	%	S	%	S	%	S	%	S	%	S
Huesca	44.3	9	29.2	6	12.7	2	7.5	1	3.1	−
Teruel	36.1	6	31.1	5	19.1	3	5.9	−	5.0	−
Zaragoza	41.2	15	31.5	12	10.6	4	8.7	3	4.2	1
Total	41.1	30	31.1	23	12.1	9	8.1	4	4.1	1

== Aftermath ==
=== Government formation ===
Investiture; Nomination of Marcelino Iglesias (PSOE)
Ballot →	5 July 2007
Required majority →	34 out of 67
Yes: • PSOE (30); • PAR (9)	39 / 67
No: • PP (23); • CHA (4); • IU (1)	28 / 67
Abstentions	0 / 67
Absentees	0 / 67

== Bibliography ==
- Ley Orgánica 5/1985, de 19 de junio, del Régimen Electoral General (Organic Law 5/1985). Official State Gazette (in Spanish). 19 June 1985 [version as of 20 April 2007]. BOE-A-1985-11672.
- Ley 2/1987, de 16 de febrero, Electoral de la Comunidad Autónoma de Aragón (Law 2/1987). Official State Gazette (in Spanish). 16 February 1987 [version as of 17 April 1999]. BOE-A-1987-5339.
- Decreto Legislativo 1/2001, de 3 julio, del Gobierno de Aragón, por el que se aprueba el texto refundido de la Ley del Presidente y del Gobierno de Aragón (Legislative Decree 1/2001). Official Gazette of Aragon (in Spanish). 3 July 2001. BOA-d-2001-90001.
- Ley Orgánica 5/2007, de 20 de abril, de reforma del Estatuto de Autonomía de Aragón (Organic Law 5/2007). Official State Gazette (in Spanish). 20 April 2007 [version as of 23 April 2007]. BOE-A-2007-8444.
- Decreto de 2 de abril de 2007, de la Presidencia del Gobierno de Aragón, por el que se convocan elecciones a las Cortes de Aragón (Decree). Official Gazette of Aragon (in Spanish). 2 April 2007.
