= Teruel (Cortes of Aragon constituency) =

Coordinates: 40°40′N 0°40′W

- Cortes of Aragon; Electoral constituency
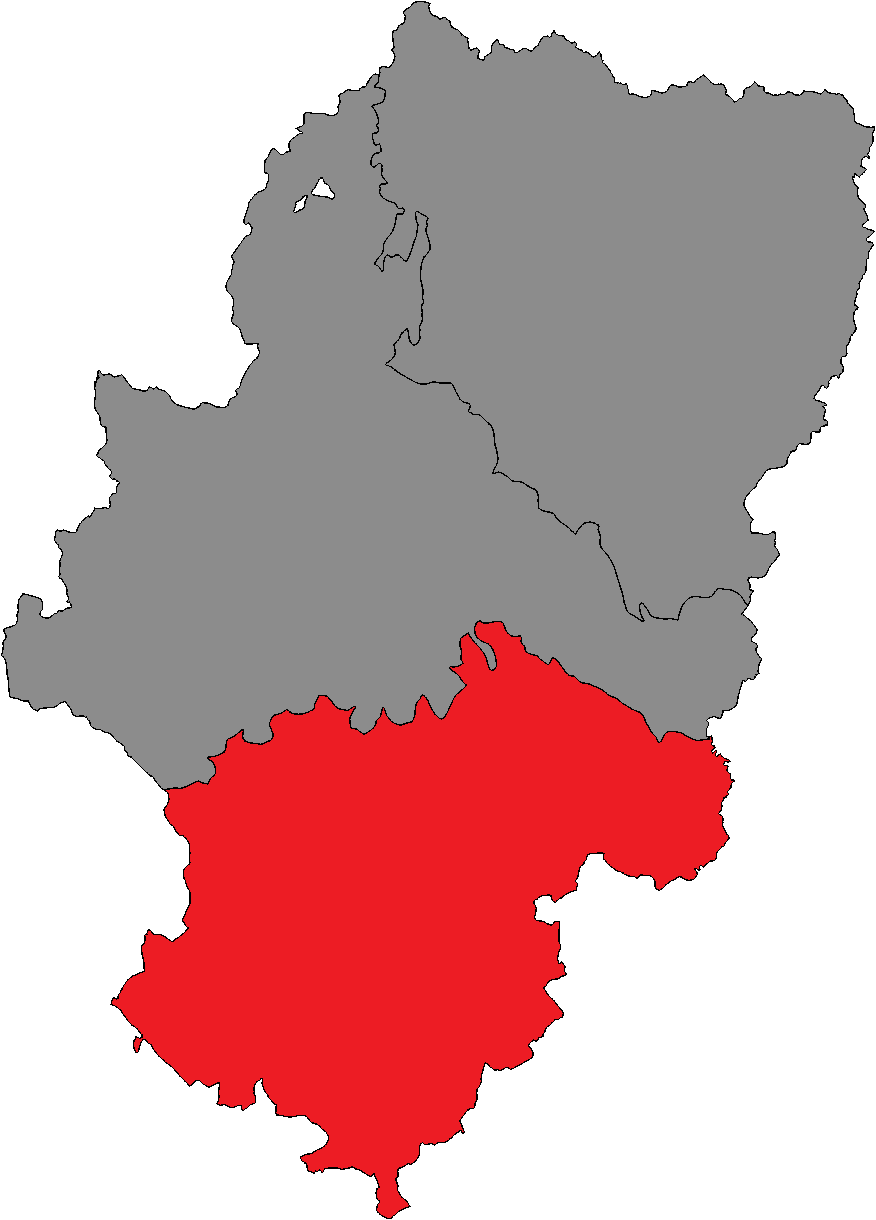
- Location of Teruel within Aragon
- Province: Teruel
- Autonomous community: Aragon
- Population: ▲136,197 (2025)
- Electorate: ▼106,062 (2026)
- Major settlements: Teruel

Current constituency
- Created: 1983
- Seats: 16 (1983–1999); 15 (1999–2003); 14 (2003–present)
- Members: PP (5); PSOE (4); Vox (3); Existe (2)

Teruel is one of the three constituencies (Spanish: circunscripciones) represented in the Cortes of Aragon, the regional legislature of the Autonomous Community of Aragon. The constituency currently elects 14 deputies. Its boundaries correspond to those of the Spanish province of Teruel. The electoral system uses the D'Hondt method and closed-list proportional representation, with a minimum threshold of three percent.

== Electoral system ==
The constituency was established under the Statute of Autonomy of Aragon of 1982 and was first contested in the 1983 regional election. The Statute (reformed in 2007) provides for the three provinces in Aragon—Huesca, Teruel and Zaragoza—to be set as multi-member constituencies in the Cortes of Aragon, each of which is assigned an initial minimum of 14 seats—13 until 2023—and the remaining ones are distributed in proportion to population (with the seat-to-population ratio in the most populated province not exceeding three times—2.75 times until 2023—that of the least populated one). The exception was the 1983 election, when each constituency was allocated a fixed number of seats. Seats are elected using the D'Hondt method and closed-list proportional voting, with a three percent-threshold of valid votes (including blank ballots) in each constituency. The use of this electoral method may result in a higher effective threshold depending on district magnitude and vote distribution. The law does not provide for by-elections to fill vacant seats; instead, any vacancies arising after the proclamation of candidates and during the legislative term are filled by the next candidates on the party lists or, when required, by designated substitutes.

Voting is based on universal suffrage, comprising all Spanish nationals over 18 years of age, registered in the constituency and with full political rights. Amendments in 2011 required non-resident citizens to apply for voting, a system known as "begged" voting (Spanish: Voto rogado), which was abolished in 2022 and attributed responsibility for a major decrease in the turnout of Spaniards abroad during the years it was in force. Additionally, those legally incapacitated were also barred from voting before amendments in 2018 granted them the right to vote.

The electoral law allows for parties and federations registered in the interior ministry, alliances and groupings of electors to present lists of candidates. Parties and federations intending to form an alliance are required to inform the relevant electoral commission within 10 days of the election call—15 before 1985—whereas groupings of electors need to secure the signature of at least two percent of the electorate in the constituencies for which they seek election (before 1985 this was one permille, with a compulsory minimum of 500 signatures), disallowing electors from signing for more than one list. Amendments in 2007 required a balanced composition of men and women in the electoral lists, so that candidates of either sex made up at least 40 percent of the total composition; amendments in 2024 reinforced these through the use of a zipper system.

== Deputies ==
Deputies 1983–present
Key to parties IU CHA Podemos PSOE CDS Existe PAR Cs PP CP AP Vox
Cortes	Election	Distribution
1st	1983	7 / 4 / 5
2nd	1987	7 / 1 / 3 / 5
3rd	1991	7 / 3 / 6
4th	1995	1 / 5 / 3 / 7
5th	1999	5 / 3 / 7
6th	2003	1 / 5 / 3 / 5
7th	2007	6 / 3 / 5
8th	2011	1 / 4 / 3 / 6
9th	2015	2 / 4 / 2 / 1 / 5
10th	2019	1 / 6 / 1 / 2 / 4
11th	2023	4 / 3 / 1 / 5 / 1
12th	2026	4 / 2 / 5 / 3

== Regional elections ==
=== 2026 ===
Summary of the 8 February 2026 Cortes of Aragon election results in Teruel
Parties and alliances	Popular vote			Seats	
Parties and alliances	Votes	%	±pp	Total	+/−
People's Party (PP)	19,354	28.72	–2.43	5	±0
Spanish Socialist Workers' Party (PSOE)	15,984	23.72	+0.95	4	±0
Vox (Vox)	13,663	20.27	+9.76	3	+2
Teruel Exists–Exists Coalition (Existe)	8,693	12.90	–7.82	2	–1
Aragonese Party (PAR)	2,906	4.31	–2.24	0	–1
Aragonese Union (CHA)	2,610	3.87	+1.89	0	±0
The Party is Over (SALF)	1,438	2.13	New	0	±0
United Left–Unite Movement (IU–MS)	1,227	1.82	–0.39	0	±0
We Can–Green Alliance (Podemos–AV)	344	0.51	–1.39	0	±0
Blank Seats to Leave Empty Seats (EB)	293	0.43	+0.21	0	±0
Animalist Party with the Environment (PACMA)	173	0.26	New	0	±0
Aragonese Coalition (Coalición Aragonesa)^{1}	35	0.05	–0.02	0	±0
Blank ballots	673	1.00	–0.40		
Total	67,393			14	±0
Valid votes	67,393	98.72	+0.25		
Invalid votes	872	1.28	–0.25		
Votes cast / turnout	68,265	64.36	–6.35		
Abstentions	37,797	35.64	+6.35		
Registered voters	106,062				
Sources
Footnotes: ^{1} Aragonese Coalition results are compared to the Federation of Independents of Aragon totals in the 2023 election.

=== 2023 ===
Summary of the 28 May 2023 Cortes of Aragon election results in Teruel
Parties and alliances	Popular vote			Seats	
Parties and alliances	Votes	%	±pp	Total	+/−
People's Party (PP)	23,059	31.15	+7.07	5	+1
Spanish Socialist Workers' Party (PSOE)	16,860	22.77	–8.69	4	–2
Teruel Exists–Exists Coalition (Existe)	15,338	20.72	New	3	+3
Vox (Vox)	7,778	10.51	+5.76	1	+1
Aragonese Party (PAR)	4,846	6.55	–3.81	1	±0
United Left of Aragon (IU)	1,634	2.21	–0.87	0	±0
Aragonese Union (CHA)	1,464	1.98	–2.60	0	±0
We Can–Green Alliance (Podemos–AV)	1,409	1.90	–4.02	0	–1
Citizens–You Aragon (CS–Tú Aragón)	389	0.53	–13.16	0	–2
Blank Seats to Leave Empty Seats (EB)	161	0.22	+0.06	0	±0
Federation of Independents of Aragon (FIA)	54	0.07	±0.00	0	±0
Blank ballots	1,038	1.40	+0.15		
Total	74,030			14	±0
Valid votes	74,030	98.47	–0.35		
Invalid votes	1,147	1.53	+0.35		
Votes cast / turnout	75,177	70.71	+1.04		
Abstentions	31,141	29.29	–1.04		
Registered voters	106,318				

=== 2019 ===
Summary of the 26 May 2019 Cortes of Aragon election results in Teruel
Parties and alliances	Popular vote			Seats	
Parties and alliances	Votes	%	±pp	Total	+/−
Spanish Socialist Workers' Party (PSOE)	23,327	31.46	+9.48	6	+2
People's Party (PP)	17,852	24.08	–3.44	4	–1
Citizens–Party of the Citizenry (Cs)	10,152	13.69	+6.49	2	+1
Aragonese Party (PAR)	7,685	10.36	–3.38	1	–1
We Can–Equo (Podemos–Equo)	4,392	5.92	–10.16	1	–1
Vox (Vox)	3,525	4.75	New	0	±0
Aragonese Union (CHA)	3,396	4.58	+1.15	0	±0
United Left of Aragon (IU)	2,282	3.08	–1.56	0	±0
Animalist Party Against Mistreatment of Animals (PACMA)	337	0.45	–0.02	0	±0
Blank Seats (EB)	116	0.16	–0.21	0	±0
Ñ Platform (PAÑ)	64	0.09	New	0	±0
Federation of Independents of Aragon (FIA)	53	0.07	–0.04	0	±0
Social Aragonese Movement (MAS)	40	0.05	New	0	±0
Blank ballots	925	1.25	–1.17		
Total	74,146			14	±0
Valid votes	74,146	98.82	+1.00		
Invalid votes	883	1.18	–1.00		
Votes cast / turnout	75,029	69.67	+0.33		
Abstentions	32,665	30.33	–0.33		
Registered voters	107,694				

=== 2015 ===
Summary of the 24 May 2015 Cortes of Aragon election results in Teruel
Parties and alliances	Popular vote			Seats	
Parties and alliances	Votes	%	±pp	Total	+/−
People's Party (PP)	20,653	27.52	–9.46	5	–1
Spanish Socialist Workers' Party (PSOE)	16,493	21.98	–5.39	4	±0
We Can (Podemos)	12,065	16.08	New	2	+2
Aragonese Party (PAR)	10,311	13.74	–2.78	2	–1
Citizens–Party of the Citizenry (C's)	5,402	7.20	New	1	+1
United Left of Aragon (IU)	3,479	4.64	–1.88	0	–1
Aragonese Union (CHA)	2,575	3.43	–1.63	0	±0
Commitment with Aragon (CCA)	1,418	1.89	–1.09	0	±0
Animalist Party Against Mistreatment of Animals (PACMA)	353	0.47	+0.22	0	±0
Blank Seats (EB)	281	0.37	New	0	±0
Zero Cuts (Recortes Cero)	120	0.16	+0.06	0	±0
Federation of Independents of Aragon (FIA)	80	0.11	+0.02	0	±0
Blank ballots	1,819	2.42	–1.04		
Total	75,049			14	±0
Valid votes	75,049	97.82	–0.53		
Invalid votes	1,676	2.18	+0.53		
Votes cast / turnout	76,725	69.34	–3.14		
Abstentions	33,927	30.66	+3.14		
Registered voters	110,652				

=== 2011 ===
Summary of the 22 May 2011 Cortes of Aragon election results in Teruel
Parties and alliances	Popular vote			Seats	
Parties and alliances	Votes	%	±pp	Total	+/−
People's Party (PP)	29,685	36.98	+5.92	6	+1
Spanish Socialist Workers' Party (PSOE)	21,967	27.37	–8.77	4	–2
Aragonese Party (PAR)	13,264	16.52	–2.63	3	±0
United Left of Aragon (IU)	5,236	6.52	+1.54	1	+1
Aragonese Union (CHA)	4,059	5.06	–0.85	0	±0
Commitment with Aragon (CCA)	2,389	2.98	New	0	±0
Union, Progress and Democracy (UPyD)	792	0.99	New	0	±0
Greens–Ecolo (V–Ecolo)^{1}	341	0.42	+0.11	0	±0
Anti-Bullfighting Party Against Mistreatment of Animals (PACMA)	204	0.25	New	0	±0
Communist Unification of Spain (UCE)	78	0.10	New	0	±0
Federation of Independents of Aragon (FIA)	75	0.09	New	0	±0
Aragonese Land (TA)	54	0.07	New	0	±0
Blank ballots	2,130	2.65	+0.96		
Total	80,274			14	±0
Valid votes	80,274	98.35	–0.82		
Invalid votes	1,344	1.65	+0.82		
Votes cast / turnout	81,618	72.48	–1.25		
Abstentions	30,986	27.52	+1.25		
Registered voters	112,604				
Sources
Footnotes: ^{1} Greens–Ecolo results are compared to The Greens–Federation of Independents of Aragon totals in the 2007 election.

=== 2007 ===
Summary of the 27 May 2007 Cortes of Aragon election results in Teruel
Parties and alliances	Popular vote			Seats	
Parties and alliances	Votes	%	±pp	Total	+/−
Spanish Socialist Workers' Party (PSOE)	30,325	36.14	+1.38	6	+1
People's Party (PP)	26,066	31.06	–2.51	5	±0
Aragonese Party (PAR)	16,067	19.15	+0.94	3	±0
Aragonese Union (CHA)	4,959	5.91	–1.66	0	–1
United Left of Aragon (IU)	4,178	4.98	+1.30	0	±0
Aragon United Citizens Party (pCUA)	591	0.70	New	0	±0
The Greens–Federation of Independents of Aragon (LV–FIA)^{1}	229	0.31	–0.06	0	±0
Family and Life Party (PFyV)	83	0.10	–0.01	0	±0
Blank ballots	1,419	1.69	+0.09		
Total	83,917			14	±0
Valid votes	83,917	99.17	+0.10		
Invalid votes	706	0.83	–0.10		
Votes cast / turnout	84,623	73.73	–0.78		
Abstentions	30,148	26.27	+0.78		
Registered voters	114,771				
Sources
Footnotes: ^{1} The Greens–Federation of Independents of Aragon results are compared to The Greens–SOS Nature totals in the 2003 election.

=== 2003 ===
Summary of the 25 May 2003 Cortes of Aragon election results in Teruel
Parties and alliances	Popular vote			Seats	
Parties and alliances	Votes	%	±pp	Total	+/−
Spanish Socialist Workers' Party (PSOE)	29,895	34.76	+3.11	5	±0
People's Party (PP)	28,871	33.57	–6.60	5	–2
Aragonese Party (PAR)	15,662	18.21	+0.51	3	±0
Aragonese Union (CHA)	6,515	7.57	+3.24	1	+1
United Left of Aragon (IU)	3,163	3.68	–0.43	0	±0
The Greens–SOS Nature (LV–SOS)	315	0.37	New	0	±0
Family and Life Party (PFyV)	98	0.11	New	0	±0
Aragonese Initiative (INAR)	62	0.07	New	0	±0
Humanist Party (PH)	50	0.06	–0.10	0	±0
Blank ballots	1,379	1.60	–0.22		
Total	86,010			14	–1
Valid votes	86,010	99.07	+0.02		
Invalid votes	809	0.93	–0.02		
Votes cast / turnout	86,819	74.51	+3.72		
Abstentions	29,707	25.49	–3.72		
Registered voters	116,526				

=== 1999 ===
Summary of the 13 June 1999 Cortes of Aragon election results in Teruel
Parties and alliances	Popular vote			Seats	
Parties and alliances	Votes	%	±pp	Total	+/−
People's Party (PP)	33,373	40.17	–0.58	7	±0
Spanish Socialist Workers' Party (PSOE)	26,295	31.65	+0.03	5	±0
Aragonese Party (PAR)	14,707	17.70	–0.56	3	±0
Aragonese Union (CHA)	3,599	4.33	+2.22	0	±0
United Left of Aragon (IU)	3,417	4.11	–1.47	0	–1
Humanist Party (PH)	132	0.16	New	0	±0
Blank ballots	1,564	1.88	+0.47		
Total	83,087			15	–1
Valid votes	83,087	99.05	–0.25		
Invalid votes	795	0.95	+0.25		
Votes cast / turnout	83,882	70.79	–3.23		
Abstentions	34,617	29.21	+3.23		
Registered voters	118,499				

=== 1995 ===
Summary of the 28 May 1995 Cortes of Aragon election results in Teruel
Parties and alliances	Popular vote			Seats	
Parties and alliances	Votes	%	±pp	Total	+/−
People's Party (PP)	35,406	40.75	+9.49	7	+1
Spanish Socialist Workers' Party (PSOE)	27,477	31.62	–6.29	5	–2
Aragonese Party (PAR)	15,863	18.26	–1.41	3	±0
United Left of Aragon (IU)	4,847	5.58	+2.56	1	+1
Aragonese Union (CHA)	1,830	2.11	+0.46	0	±0
Aragonese Unity (UA)	133	0.15	New	0	±0
Platform of Independents of Spain (PIE)	105	0.12	New	0	±0
Blank ballots	1,223	1.41	+0.35		
Total	86,884			16	±0
Valid votes	86,884	99.30	–0.01		
Invalid votes	616	0.70	+0.01		
Votes cast / turnout	87,500	74.02	+3.87		
Abstentions	30,705	25.98	–3.87		
Registered voters	118,205				

=== 1991 ===
Summary of the 26 May 1991 Cortes of Aragon election results in Teruel
Parties and alliances	Popular vote			Seats	
Parties and alliances	Votes	%	±pp	Total	+/−
Spanish Socialist Workers' Party (PSOE)	31,570	37.91	+2.09	7	±0
People's Party (PP)^{1}	26,037	31.26	+1.11	6	+1
Aragonese Party (PAR)	16,386	19.67	+1.94	3	±0
Democratic and Social Centre (CDS)	4,175	5.01	–5.17	0	–1
Aragon Alternative Convergence–United Left (CAA–IU)	2,517	3.02	+0.14	0	±0
Aragonese Union (CHA)	1,372	1.65	+1.17	0	±0
Workers' Socialist Party (PST)	344	0.41	New	0	±0
Blank ballots	885	1.06	–0.42		
Total	83,286			16	±0
Valid votes	83,286	99.31	+0.33		
Invalid votes	579	0.69	–0.33		
Votes cast / turnout	83,865	70.15	–1.19		
Abstentions	35,680	29.85	+1.19		
Registered voters	119,545				
Sources
Footnotes: ^{1} People's Party results are compared to the combined totals of People's Alliance and People's Democratic Party–Centrists of Aragon in the 1987 election.

=== 1987 ===
Summary of the 10 June 1987 Cortes of Aragon election results in Teruel
Parties and alliances	Popular vote			Seats	
Parties and alliances	Votes	%	±pp	Total	+/−
Spanish Socialist Workers' Party (PSOE)	30,507	35.82	–2.70	7	±0
People's Alliance (AP)^{1}	23,246	27.29	n/a	5	+1
Regionalist Aragonese Party (PAR)	15,101	17.73	–5.65	3	–1
Democratic and Social Centre (CDS)	8,668	10.18	+6.02	1	+1
Aragon Alternative Convergence–United Left (CAA–IU)^{2}	2,454	2.88	+1.12	0	±0
People's Democratic Party–Centrists of Aragon (PDP)^{1}	2,433	2.86	n/a	0	–1
Workers' Party of Spain–Communist Unity (PTE–UC)	860	1.01	New	0	±0
Aragonese Union (UA/CHA)	412	0.48	New	0	±0
Humanist Platform (PH)	232	0.27	New	0	±0
Blank ballots	1,263	1.48	+0.67		
Total	85,176			16	±0
Valid votes	85,176	98.98	+0.52		
Invalid votes	876	1.02	–0.52		
Votes cast / turnout	86,052	71.34	+5.35		
Abstentions	34,562	28.66	–5.35		
Registered voters	120,614				
Sources
Footnotes: ^{1} Within the People's Coalition alliance in the 1983 election.; ^{2} Aragon Alternative Convergence–United Left results are compared to Communist Party of Spain totals in the 1983 election.

=== 1983 ===
Summary of the 8 May 1983 Cortes of Aragon election results in Teruel
Parties and alliances	Popular vote			Seats	
Parties and alliances	Votes	%	±pp	Total	+/−
Spanish Socialist Workers' Party (PSOE)	30,978	38.52	n/a	7	n/a
People's Coalition (AP–PDP–UL)	24,689	30.70	n/a	5	n/a
Regionalist Aragonese Party (PAR)	18,806	23.38	n/a	4	n/a
Democratic and Social Centre (CDS)	3,343	4.16	n/a	0	n/a
Communist Party of Spain (PCE)	1,412	1.76	n/a	0	n/a
United Left of Aragon (MCA–LCR)	545	0.68	n/a	0	n/a
Blank ballots	650	0.81	n/a		
Total	80,423			16	n/a
Valid votes	80,423	98.46	n/a		
Invalid votes	1,254	1.54	n/a		
Votes cast / turnout	81,677	65.99	n/a		
Abstentions	42,100	34.01	n/a		
Registered voters	123,777				

== Bibliography ==
- Real Decreto-ley 20/1977, de 18 de marzo, sobre Normas Electorales (Royal Decree-Law 20/1977). Official State Gazette (in Spanish). 18 March 1977. BOE-A-1977-7445.
- Ley Orgánica 8/1982, de 10 de agosto, de Estatuto de Autonomía de Aragón (Organic Law 8/1982). Official State Gazette (in Spanish). 10 August 1982. BOE-A-1982-20819.
- Decreto 24/83, de 9 de marzo, de la Diputación General de Aragón por el que se convocan elecciones a Cortes de Aragón (Decree). Official Gazette of Aragon (in Spanish). 10 March 1983.
- Ley Orgánica 5/1985, de 19 de junio, del Régimen Electoral General (Organic Law 5/1985). Official State Gazette (in Spanish). 19 June 1985. BOE-A-1985-11672.
- Ley 2/1987, de 16 de febrero, Electoral de la Comunidad Autónoma de Aragón (Law 2/1987). Official State Gazette (in Spanish). 16 February 1987. BOE-A-1987-5339.
- Ley Orgánica 5/2007, de 20 de abril, de reforma del Estatuto de Autonomía de Aragón (Organic Law 5/2007). Official State Gazette (in Spanish). 20 April 2007. BOE-A-2007-8444.
