= 2003 Aragonese regional election =

Election in the Spanish region of Aragon

- 25 May 2003

All 67 seats in the Cortes of Aragon 34 seats needed for a majority
- Opinion polls
- Registered: 1,019,644 ▲0.2%
- Turnout: 717,457 (70.4%) ▲5.8 pp
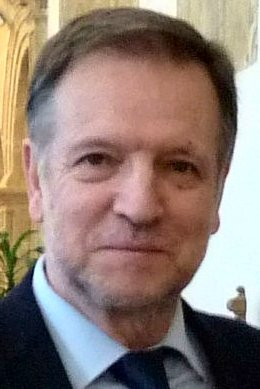

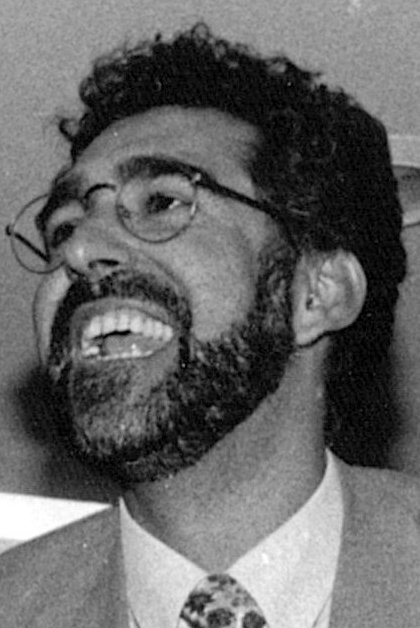

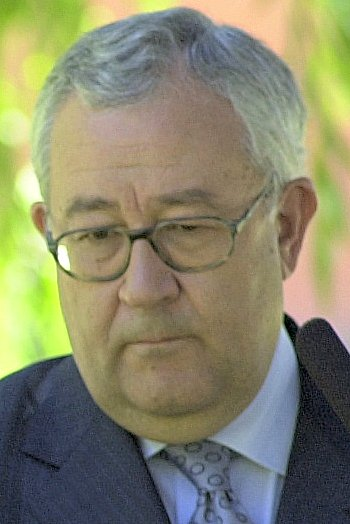

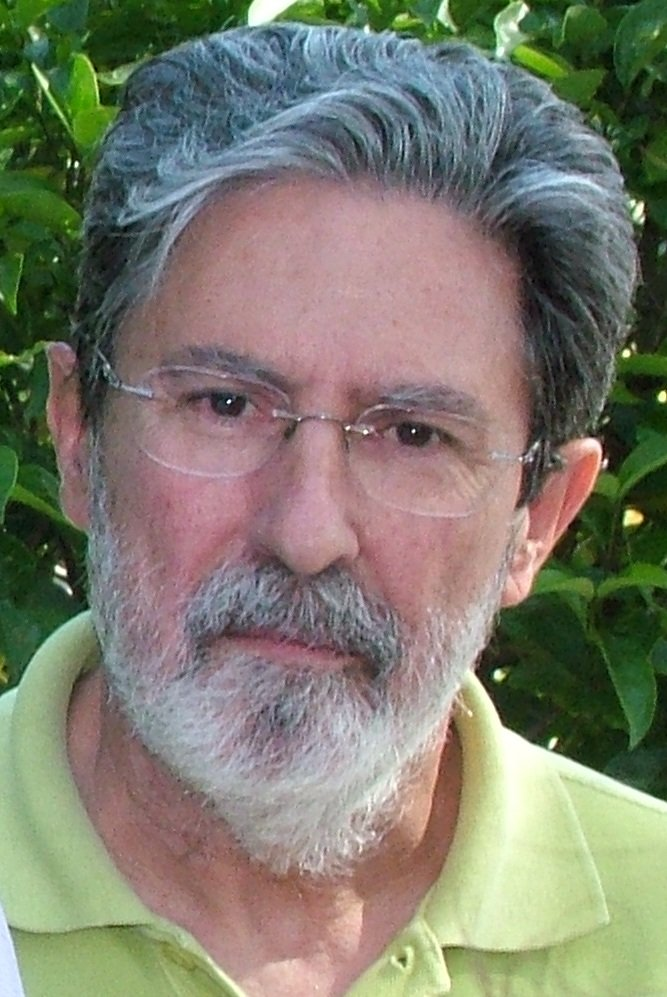
	First party	Second party	Third party
Leader	Marcelino Iglesias	Gustavo Alcalde	Chesús Bernal
Party	PSOE	PP	CHA
Leader since	15 February 1995	18 May 2001	29 June 1986
Leader's seat	Zaragoza	Zaragoza	Zaragoza
Last election	23 seats, 30.8%	28 seats, 38.2%	5 seats, 11.0%
Seats won	27	22	9
Seat change	▲4	▼6	▲4
Popular vote	270,468	219,058	97,763
Percentage	37.9%	30.7%	13.7%
Swing	▲7.1 pp	▼7.5 pp	▲2.7 pp
	Fourth party	Fifth party
Leader	José Ángel Biel	Adolfo Barrena
Party	PAR	IU
Leader since	2 June 2000	May 2002
Leader's seat	Teruel	Zaragoza
Last election	10 seats, 13.3%	1 seat, 3.9%
Seats won	8	1
Seat change	▼2	0
Popular vote	79,670	21,795
Percentage	11.2%	3.1%
Swing	▼2.1 pp	▼0.8 pp
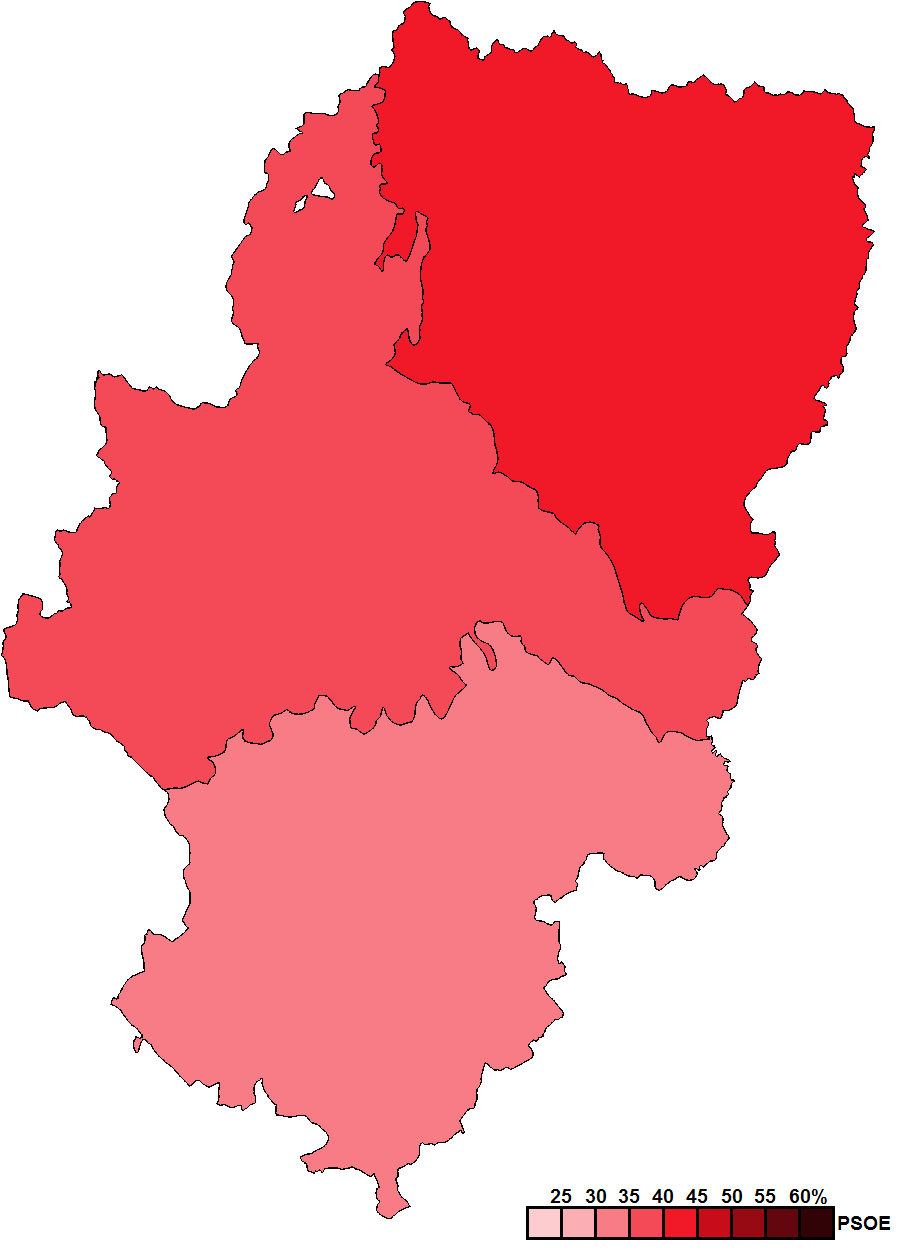
- Constituency results map for the Cortes of Aragon
President before election
Marcelino Iglesias
PSOE
President after election
Marcelino Iglesias
PSOE

A regional election was held in Aragon on 25 May 2003 to elect the 6th Cortes of the autonomous community. All 67 seats in the Cortes were up for election. It was held concurrently with regional elections in twelve other autonomous communities and local elections all across Spain.

The election saw the Spanish Socialist Workers' Party (PSOE), which had ruled Aragon since the previous election, becoming the largest party in the Courts for the first time since the 1991 election. The PSOE gains came at the expense of the People's Party (PP), which saw a drop of 7 points on its vote share. The Aragonese Union (CHA) made gains and overtook the Aragonese Party (PAR) as the third largest party in the Cortes. For the PAR, this was the fourth consecutive election where it lost ground. United Left (IU) held its single seat, albeit with a slightly reduced vote share.

The PSOE and PAR maintained the coalition administration formed after the previous election. As a result, Marcelino Iglesias was re-elected as President of Aragon.

== Overview ==
Under the 1982 Statute of Autonomy, the Cortes of Aragon was the unicameral legislature of the homonymous autonomous community, having legislative power in devolved matters, as well as the ability to grant or withdraw confidence from a regional president. The electoral and procedural rules were supplemented by national law provisions.

=== Date ===
The term of the Cortes of Aragon expired four years after the date of its previous ordinary election, with election day being fixed for the fourth Sunday of May every four years. The election decree was required to be issued no later than 54 days before the scheduled election date and published on the following day in the Official Gazette of Aragon (BOA). The previous election was held on 13 June 1999, setting the date for election day on the fourth Sunday of May four years later, which was 25 May 2003.

The regional president had the prerogative to dissolve the Cortes of Aragon at any given time and call a snap election, provided that no motion of no confidence was in process, no nationwide election had been called and that dissolution did not occur either during the first legislative session or during the last year of parliament before its planned expiration, nor before one year after a previous one. In the event of an investiture process failing to elect a regional president within a two-month period from the Cortes's reconvening, the chamber was to be automatically dissolved and a fresh election called. Any snap election held as a result of these circumstances did not alter the date of the chamber's next ordinary election, with elected lawmakers serving the remainder of its original four-year term.

The election to the Cortes of Aragon was officially called on 1 April 2003 with the publication of the corresponding decree in the BOA, setting election day for 25 May and scheduling for the chamber to reconvene on 20 June.

=== Electoral system ===
Voting for the Cortes was based on universal suffrage, comprising all Spanish nationals over 18 years of age, registered in Aragon and with full political rights, provided that they had not been deprived of the right to vote by a final sentence, nor were legally incapacitated.

The Cortes of Aragon had a minimum of 60 and a maximum of 75 seats, with electoral provisions fixing its size at 67. All were elected in three multi-member constituencies—corresponding to the provinces of Huesca, Teruel and Zaragoza, each of which was assigned an initial minimum of 13 seats and the remaining 28 distributed in proportion to population (with the seat-to-population ratio in the most populated province not exceeding 2.75 times that of the least populated one)—using the D'Hondt method and closed-list proportional voting, with a three percent-threshold of valid votes (including blank ballots) in each constituency. The use of this electoral method resulted in a higher effective threshold depending on district magnitude and vote distribution.

As a result of the aforementioned allocation, each Cortes constituency was entitled the following seats:

Seats	Constituencies
35	Zaragoza^{(+1)}
18	Huesca
14	Teruel^{(−1)}

The law did not provide for by-elections to fill vacant seats; instead, any vacancies arising after the proclamation of candidates and during the legislative term were filled by the next candidates on the party lists or, when required, by designated substitutes.

=== Outgoing parliament ===
The table below shows the composition of the parliamentary groups in the chamber at the time of the election call.

Parliamentary composition in April 2003
Groups	Parties	Legislators	
Groups	Parties	Seats	Total
People's Parliamentary Group in the Cortes of Aragon	PP	28	28
Socialist Parliamentary Group	PSOE	23	23
Aragonese Party's Parliamentary Group	PAR	10	10
Aragonese Union Parliamentary Group	CHA	5	5
Mixed Parliamentary Group	IU	1	1

== Parties and candidates ==
The electoral law allowed for parties and federations registered in the interior ministry, alliances and groupings of electors to present lists of candidates. Parties and federations intending to form an alliance were required to inform the relevant electoral commission within 10 days of the election call, whereas groupings of electors needed to secure the signature of at least one percent of the electorate in the constituencies for which they sought election, disallowing electors from signing for more than one list.

Below is a list of the main parties and alliances which contested the election:

Candidacy	Parties and alliances	Leading candidate	Ideology	Previous result		Gov.	Ref.
Candidacy	Parties and alliances	Leading candidate	Ideology	Vote %	Seats	Gov.	Ref.
PP	List: People's Party (PP)	Gustavo Alcalde	Conservatism; Christian democracy	38.2%	28	No	
PSOE	List: Spanish Socialist Workers' Party (PSOE)	Marcelino Iglesias	Social democracy	30.8%	23	Yes	
PAR	List: Aragonese Party (PAR)	José Ángel Biel	Regionalism; Centrism	13.3%	10	Yes	
CHA	List: Aragonese Union (CHA)	Chesús Bernal	Aragonese nationalism Eco-socialism	11.0%	5	No	
IU	List: United Left of Aragon (IU) – Communist Party of Aragon (PCE–A) – Revolutionary Workers' Party (POR) – Workers' Revolutionary Party–Revolutionary Left (PRT–IR)	Adolfo Barrena	Socialism; Communism	3.9%	1	No	

== Opinion polls ==
The tables below list opinion polling results in reverse chronological order, showing the most recent first and using the dates when the survey fieldwork was done, as opposed to the date of publication. Where the fieldwork dates are unknown, the date of publication is given instead. The highest percentage figure in each polling survey is displayed with its background shaded in the leading party's colour. If a tie ensues, this is applied to the figures with the highest percentages. The "Lead" column on the right shows the percentage-point difference between the parties with the highest percentages in a poll.

=== Voting intention estimates ===
The table below lists weighted voting intention estimates. Refusals are generally excluded from the party vote percentages, while question wording and the treatment of "don't know" responses and those not intending to vote may vary between polling organisations. When available, seat projections determined by the polling organisations are displayed below (or in place of) the percentages in a smaller font; 34 seats were required for an absolute majority in the Cortes of Aragon.

Color key:

Exit poll

Polling firm/Commissioner	Fieldwork date	Sample size	Turnout	PP	PSOE	PAR	CHA	IU	Lead
2003 regional election	25 May 2003	—N/a	70.4	30.7; 22	37.9; 27	11.2; 8	13.7; 9	3.1; 1	7.2
Sigma Dos/Antena 3	25 May 2003	?	?	? 23/25	? 24/26	? 6/8	? 8/10	? 1/3	?
Ipsos–Eco/RTVE	25 May 2003	?	?	? 23/25	? 24/26	? 7/8	? 9/10	? 1	?
C&J/El Periódico	12–17 May 2003	?	?	29.0; 20/21	37.9; 27/28	13.8; 9/10	13.3; 9/10	? 1	8.9
CIS	22 Mar–28 Apr 2003	1,339	68.6	30.4; 22	35.6; 26	13.9; 10	14.5; 8	3.9; 1	5.2
C&J/El Periódico	27 Apr 2003	?	?	28.0; 19/20	38.1; 27/28	15.2; 9/10	? 9/10	? 0/1	10.1
CIS	9 Sep–9 Oct 2002	492	71.6	35.1	33.1	10.7	15.3	4.1	2.0
2000 general election	12 Mar 2000	—N/a	71.4	47.2 (34)	31.1 (24)	5.4 (3)	10.4 (5)	3.5 (1)	16.1
1999 regional election	13 Jun 1999	—N/a	64.6	38.2; 28	30.8; 23	13.3; 10	11.0; 5	3.9; 1	7.4

=== Voting preferences ===
The table below lists raw, unweighted voting preferences.

Polling firm/Commissioner	Fieldwork date	Sample size	PP	PSOE	PAR	CHA	IU	Question	X mark	Lead
2003 regional election (Note: Does not include non-resident citizens.)	25 May 2003	—N/a	21.8	26.9	7.9	9.7	2.2	—N/a	28.7	5.1
CIS	22 Mar–28 Apr 2003	1,339	13.0	21.7	5.0	7.2	2.1	42.1	7.4	8.7
CIS	9 Sep–9 Oct 2002	492	20.1	21.1	3.5	8.1	1.6	35.4	8.1	1.0
2000 general election	12 Mar 2000	—N/a	33.9	22.2	3.9	7.5	2.5	—N/a	27.8	11.7
1999 regional election	13 Jun 1999	—N/a	24.9	20.0	8.6	7.2	2.5	—N/a	35.0	4.9

=== Victory preferences ===
The table below lists opinion polling on the victory preferences for each party in the event of a municipal election taking place.

Polling firm/Commissioner	Fieldwork date	Sample size	PP	PSOE	PAR	CHA	IU	Other/ None	Question	Lead
CIS	22 Mar–28 Apr 2003	1,339	16.9	29.2	6.6	9.6	2.5	0.4	34.8	12.3

=== Victory likelihood ===
The table below lists opinion polling on the perceived likelihood of victory for each party in the event of a municipal election taking place.

Polling firm/Commissioner	Fieldwork date	Sample size	PP	PSOE	PAR	CHA	IU	Other/ None	Question	Lead
CIS	22 Mar–28 Apr 2003	1,339	9.7	43.5	2.4	0.6	0.2	0.1	43.5	33.8

=== Preferred President ===
The table below lists opinion polling on leader preferences to become president of the Government of Aragon.

Polling firm/Commissioner	Fieldwork date	Sample size						Other/ None/ Not care	Question	Lead
Polling firm/Commissioner	Fieldwork date	Sample size	Alcalde PP	Iglesias PSOE	Biel PAR	Bernal CHA	Barrena IU	Other/ None/ Not care	Question	Lead
CIS	22 Mar–28 Apr 2003	1,339	8.6	30.8	5.6	7.0	0.6	1.0	46.5	22.2

== Results ==
=== Overall ===
← Summary of the 25 May 2003 Cortes of Aragon election results →
Parties and alliances	Popular vote			Seats	
Parties and alliances	Votes	%	±pp	Total	+/−
Spanish Socialist Workers' Party (PSOE)	270,468	37.94	+7.13	27	+4
People's Party (PP)	219,058	30.73	−7.48	22	−6
Aragonese Union (CHA)	97,763	13.71	+2.67	9	+4
Aragonese Party (PAR)	79,670	11.18	−2.07	8	−2
United Left of Aragon (IU)	21,795	3.06	−0.80	1	±0
The Greens–SOS Nature (LV–SOS)^{1}	4,308	0.60	+0.05	0	±0
Aragonese Initiative (INAR)	1,703	0.24	New	0	±0
Family and Life Party (PFyV)	1,300	0.18	New	0	±0
Democratic and Social Centre (CDS)	1,056	0.15	New	0	±0
Republican Left (IR)	519	0.07	New	0	±0
Humanist Party (PH)	330	0.05	−0.10	0	±0
Blank ballots	14,874	2.09	+0.01		
Total	712,844			67	±0
Valid votes	712,844	99.36	+0.07		
Invalid votes	4,613	0.64	−0.07		
Votes cast / turnout	717,457	70.36	+5.76		
Abstentions	302,187	29.64	−5.76		
Registered voters	1,019,644				
Sources
Footnotes: ^{1} The Greens–SOS Nature results are compared to SOS Nature totals in the 1999 election.

Popular vote
PSOE	37.94%
PP	30.73%
CHA	13.71%
PAR	11.18%
IU	3.06%
Others	1.29%
Blank ballots	2.09%

Seats
PSOE	40.30%
PP	32.84%
CHA	13.43%
PAR	11.94%
IU	1.49%

=== Distribution by constituency ===
Constituency	PSOE		PP		CHA		PAR		IU	
Constituency	%	S	%	S	%	S	%	S	%	S
Huesca	42.4	8	29.7	6	10.0	2	12.3	2	2.6	−
Teruel	34.8	5	33.6	5	7.6	1	18.2	3	3.7	−
Zaragoza	37.4	14	30.5	11	15.7	6	9.7	3	3.1	1
Total	37.9	27	30.7	22	13.7	9	11.2	8	3.1	1

== Aftermath ==
=== Government formation ===
Investiture; Nomination of Marcelino Iglesias (PSOE)
Ballot →	3 July 2003
Required majority →	34 out of 67
Yes: • PSOE (27); • PAR (8)	35 / 67
No: • PP (22); • CHA (9)	31 / 67
Abstentions: • IU (1)	1 / 67
Absentees	0 / 67

== Bibliography ==
- Ley Orgánica 8/1982, de 10 de agosto, de Estatuto de Autonomía de Aragón (Organic Law 8/1982). Official State Gazette (in Spanish). 10 August 1982. BOE-A-1982-20819.
- Ley Orgánica 5/1985, de 19 de junio, del Régimen Electoral General (Organic Law 5/1985). Official State Gazette (in Spanish). 19 June 1985 [version as of 11 March 2003]. BOE-A-1985-11672.
- Ley 2/1987, de 16 de febrero, Electoral de la Comunidad Autónoma de Aragón (Law 2/1987). Official State Gazette (in Spanish). 16 February 1987 [version as of 17 April 1999]. BOE-A-1987-5339.
- Ley Orgánica 5/1996, de 30 de diciembre, de Reforma de la Ley Orgánica 8/1982, de 10 de agosto, de Estatuto de Autonomía de Aragón, modificada por la Ley Orgánica 6/1994, de 24 de marzo, de reforma de dicho Estatuto (Organic Law 5/1996). Official State Gazette (in Spanish). 30 December 1996. BOE-A-1996-29115.
- Decreto Legislativo 1/2001, de 3 julio, del Gobierno de Aragón, por el que se aprueba el texto refundido de la Ley del Presidente y del Gobierno de Aragón (Legislative Decree 1/2001). Official Gazette of Aragon (in Spanish). 3 July 2001. BOA-d-2001-90001.
- Decreto de 31 de marzo de 2003, de la Presidencia del Gobierno de Aragón, por el que se convocan elecciones a las Cortes de Aragón (Decree). Official Gazette of Aragon (in Spanish). 31 March 2003.
