= Gustavo Alcalde =

Spanish politician

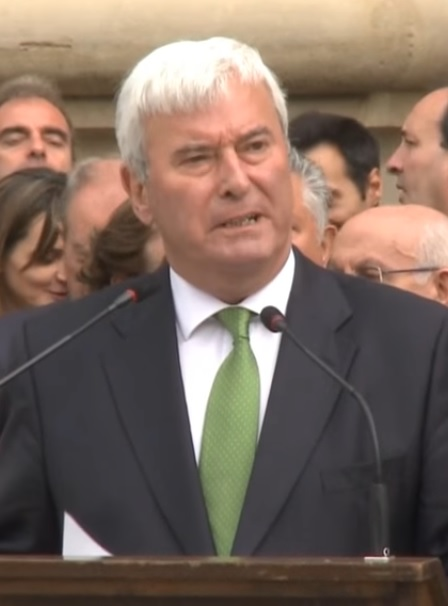

Gustavo Alcalde Sánchez (born 16 August 1955) is a Spanish People's Party politician.

He was a member of the Cortes of Aragon (1995–1996; 1999–2011), the Congress of Deputies (1996–1999) and the Senate of Spain (1993–1996; 2003–2012). From 2001 to 2008, he was president of the People's Party of Aragon. He was the Spanish government's delegate to Aragon from 2012 to 2018.

== Biography ==
Born in Calatayud in Aragon, Alcalde is married and has three daughters. He graduated in medicine and surgery from the University of Zaragoza, and then specialised in family medicine.

Alcalde was put in charge of healthcare by the provincial deputation of Zaragoza from 1988 to 1991, and was the secretary general of the People's Party of Aragon from 1993 to 1996. In 1996, he left his seat in the Cortes of Aragon to be the lead candidate for the PP in the Zaragoza constituency during elections to the Congress of Deputies; he returned to the regional legislature in 1999 as fourth in the PP list for the equivalent constituency.

In May 2001, Alcalde was named president of the People's Party of Aragon after the assassination of Manuel Giménez Abad by ETA. He led the party in the 2003 Aragonese regional election in which their deficit behind the Spanish Socialist Workers' Party (PSOE) grew; this was in part due to opposition to the Plan Hidrólogico Nacional and prime minister José María Aznar's support of the Iraq War. Despite the losses, Alcalde was re-elected president of the regional party in November 2004 with 92% of the votes, a fall of two percentage points from two years earlier. In his new executive, he marginalised allies of the former mayor of Zaragoza, José Atarés.

In the 2007 Aragonese regional election, the PP gained one seat despite receiving 12,000 fewer votes, and finished second to the PSOE again. In November 2008, he was succeeded as regional party leader by Luisa Fernanda Rudi. In his farewell speech, he said that the incumbent PSOE government of president Marcelino Iglesias had not solved the region's problems of depopulation and lack of infrastructure.

In January 2012, Alcalde left his seat in the Senate of Spain to be the national government's delegate to Aragon. In June 2018, following the 2018 vote of no confidence in the government of Mariano Rajoy, the new PSOE government of Pedro Sánchez named Carmen Sánchez Pérez in his place.
