= Zaragoza (Cortes of Aragon constituency) =

Coordinates: 41°35′N 1°00′W

- Cortes of Aragon; Electoral constituency
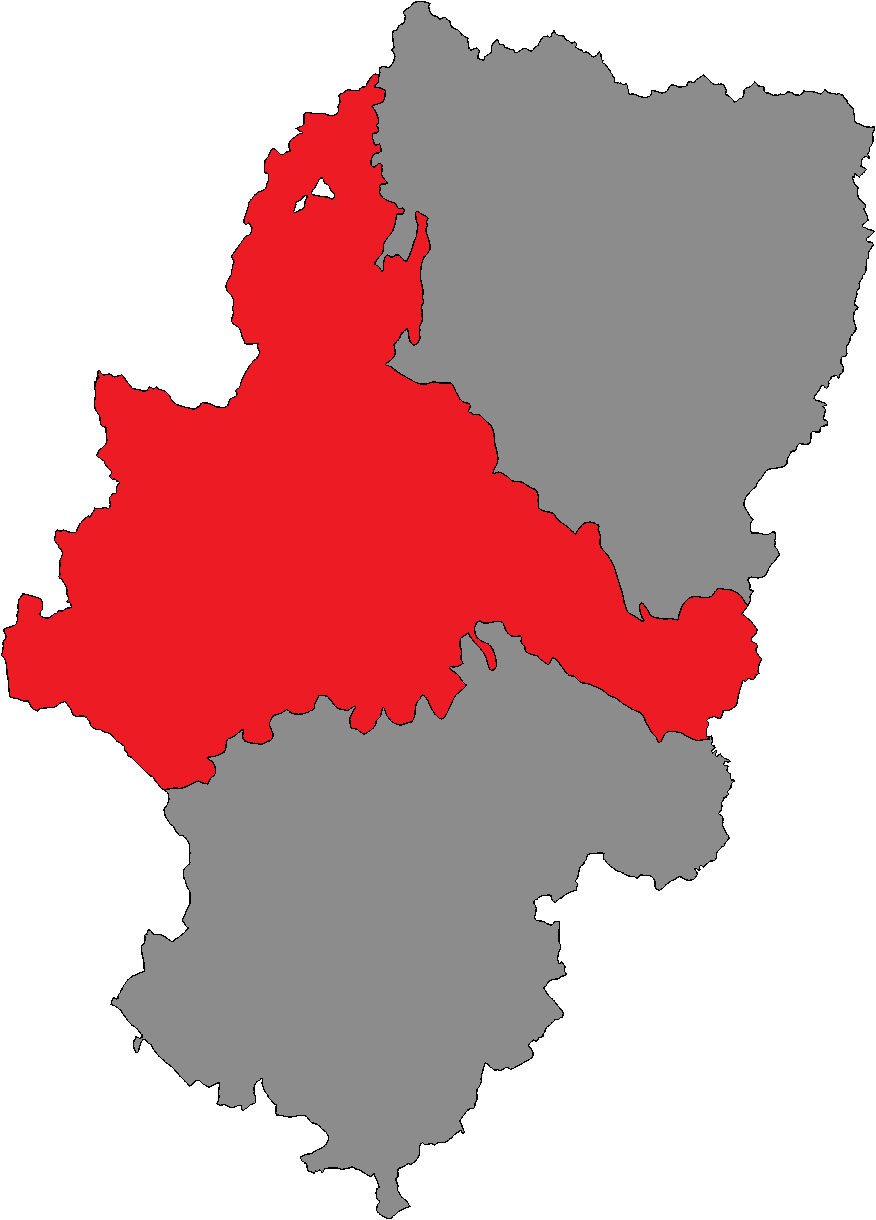
- Location of Zaragoza within Aragon
- Province: Zaragoza
- Autonomous community: Aragon
- Population: ▲991,991 (2025)
- Electorate: ▲755,081 (2026)
- Major settlements: Zaragoza

Current constituency
- Created: 1983
- Seats: 32 (1983–1987); 33 (1987–1999); 34 (1999–2003); 35 (2003–present)
- Members: PP (14); PSOE (9); Vox (7); CHA (4); IU–MS (1)

Zaragoza is one of the three constituencies (Spanish: circunscripciones) represented in the Cortes of Aragon, the regional legislature of the Autonomous Community of Aragon. The constituency currently elects 35 deputies. Its boundaries correspond to those of the Spanish province of Zaragoza. The electoral system uses the D'Hondt method and closed-list proportional representation, with a minimum threshold of three percent.

== Electoral system ==
The constituency was established under the Statute of Autonomy of Aragon of 1982 and was first contested in the 1983 regional election. The Statute (reformed in 2007) provides for the three provinces in Aragon—Huesca, Teruel and Zaragoza—to be set as multi-member constituencies in the Cortes of Aragon, each of which is assigned an initial minimum of 14 seats—13 until 2023—and the remaining ones are distributed in proportion to population (with the seat-to-population ratio in the most populated province not exceeding three times—2.75 times until 2023—that of the least populated one). The exception was the 1983 election, when each constituency was allocated a fixed number of seats. Seats are elected using the D'Hondt method and closed-list proportional voting, with a three percent-threshold of valid votes (including blank ballots) in each constituency. The use of this electoral method may result in a higher effective threshold depending on district magnitude and vote distribution. The law does not provide for by-elections to fill vacant seats; instead, any vacancies arising after the proclamation of candidates and during the legislative term are filled by the next candidates on the party lists or, when required, by designated substitutes.

Voting is based on universal suffrage, comprising all Spanish nationals over 18 years of age, registered in the constituency and with full political rights. Amendments in 2011 required non-resident citizens to apply for voting, a system known as "begged" voting (Spanish: Voto rogado), which was abolished in 2022 and attributed responsibility for a major decrease in the turnout of Spaniards abroad during the years it was in force. Additionally, those legally incapacitated were also barred from voting before amendments in 2018 granted them the right to vote.

The electoral law allows for parties and federations registered in the interior ministry, alliances and groupings of electors to present lists of candidates. Parties and federations intending to form an alliance are required to inform the relevant electoral commission within 10 days of the election call—15 before 1985—whereas groupings of electors need to secure the signature of at least two percent of the electorate in the constituencies for which they seek election (before 1985 this was one permille, with a compulsory minimum of 500 signatures), disallowing electors from signing for more than one list. Amendments in 2007 required a balanced composition of men and women in the electoral lists, so that candidates of either sex made up at least 40 percent of the total composition; amendments in 2024 reinforced these through the use of a zipper system.

== Deputies ==
Deputies 1983–present
Key to parties PCE IU CHA Podemos Podemos–AV PSOE CDS PAR Cs PP CP AP Vox
Cortes	Election	Distribution
1st	1983	1 / 16 / 1 / 7 / 7
2nd	1987	1 / 13 / 3 / 11 / 5
3rd	1991	2 / 15 / 9 / 7
4th	1995	3 / 2 / 8 / 7 / 13
5th	1999	1 / 4 / 11 / 4 / 14
6th	2003	1 / 6 / 14 / 3 / 11
7th	2007	1 / 3 / 15 / 4 / 12
8th	2011	2 / 3 / 11 / 2 / 17
9th	2015	1 / 2 / 8 / 8 / 2 / 3 / 11
10th	2019	1 / 2 / 3 / 11 / 1 / 7 / 8 / 2
11th	2023	1 / 2 / 1 / 12 / 15 / 4
12th	2026	1 / 4 / 9 / 14 / 7

== Regional elections ==
=== 2026 ===
Summary of the 8 February 2026 Cortes of Aragon election results in Zaragoza
Parties and alliances	Popular vote			Seats	
Parties and alliances	Votes	%	±pp	Total	+/−
People's Party (PP)	174,005	35.25	–0.99	14	–1
Spanish Socialist Workers' Party (PSOE)	118,133	23.93	–6.52	9	–3
Vox (Vox)	85,557	17.33	+5.71	7	+3
Aragonese Union (CHA)	51,981	10.53	+5.03	4	+2
United Left–Unite Movement (IU–MS)	15,847	3.21	–0.18	1	±0
The Party is Over (SALF)	14,373	2.91	New	0	±0
Aragon Exists–Exists Coalition (Existe)	12,580	2.55	–0.40	0	±0
We Can–Green Alliance (Podemos–AV)	5,241	1.06	–3.30	0	–1
Aragonese Party (PAR)	4,021	0.81	–0.32	0	±0
Blank Seats to Leave Empty Seats (EB)	3,282	0.66	+0.22	0	±0
Animalist Party with the Environment (PACMA)	2,127	0.43	–0.26	0	±0
Communist Party of the Workers of Spain (PCTE)	518	0.10	–0.08	0	±0
For a Fairer World (M+J)	437	0.09	New	0	±0
Aragonese Coalition (Coalición Aragonesa)^{1}	356	0.07	–0.10	0	±0
Blank ballots	5,212	1.06	–0.47		
Total	493,670			35	±0
Valid votes	493,670	99.13	+0.25		
Invalid votes	4,326	0.87	–0.25		
Votes cast / turnout	497,996	65.95	–0.20		
Abstentions	257,085	34.05	+0.20		
Registered voters	755,081				
Sources
Footnotes: ^{1} Aragonese Coalition results are compared to the Federation of Independents of Aragon totals in the 2023 election.

=== 2023 ===
Summary of the 28 May 2023 Cortes of Aragon election results in Zaragoza
Parties and alliances	Popular vote			Seats	
Parties and alliances	Votes	%	±pp	Total	+/−
People's Party (PP)	175,274	36.24	+15.90	15	+7
Spanish Socialist Workers' Party (PSOE)	147,267	30.45	+0.38	12	+1
Vox (Vox)	56,209	11.62	+5.17	4	+2
Aragonese Union (CHA)	26,580	5.50	–1.42	2	±0
We Can–Green Alliance (Podemos–AV)	21,104	4.36	–4.05	1	–2
United Left of Aragon (IU)	16,409	3.39	–0.19	1	±0
Aragon Exists–Exists Coalition (Existe)	14,270	2.95	New	0	±0
Citizens–You Aragon (CS–Tú Aragón)	6,483	1.34	–16.44	0	–7
Aragonese Party (PAR)	5,446	1.13	–2.47	0	–1
Animalist Party with the Environment (PACMA)^{1}	3,343	0.69	–0.02	0	±0
Blank Seats to Leave Empty Seats (EB)	2,120	0.44	+0.21	0	±0
Communist Party of the Workers of Spain (PCTE)	878	0.18	+0.06	0	±0
Federation of Independents of Aragon (FIA)	821	0.17	+0.03	0	±0
Blank ballots	7,399	1.53	+0.64		
Total	483,603			35	±0
Valid votes	483,603	98.88	–0.56		
Invalid votes	5,482	1.12	+0.56		
Votes cast / turnout	489,085	66.15	+0.51		
Abstentions	250,255	33.85	–0.51		
Registered voters	739,340				
Sources
Footnotes: ^{1} Animalist Party with the Environment results are compared to Animalist Party Against Mistreatment of Animals totals in the 2019 election.

=== 2019 ===
Summary of the 26 May 2019 Cortes of Aragon election results in Zaragoza
Parties and alliances	Popular vote			Seats	
Parties and alliances	Votes	%	±pp	Total	+/−
Spanish Socialist Workers' Party (PSOE)	144,888	30.07	+9.93	11	+3
People's Party (PP)	98,014	20.34	–7.47	8	–3
Citizens–Party of the Citizenry (Cs)	85,681	17.78	+7.77	7	+4
We Can–Equo (Podemos–Equo)^{1}	40,508	8.41	–13.50	3	–5
Aragonese Union (CHA)	33,323	6.92	+1.80	2	±0
Vox (Vox)	31,103	6.45	New	2	+2
Aragonese Party (PAR)	17,333	3.60	–1.63	1	–1
United Left of Aragon (IU)	17,246	3.58	–0.79	1	±0
Animalist Party Against Mistreatment of Animals (PACMA)	3,404	0.71	–0.12	0	±0
Ñ Platform (PAÑ)	3,008	0.62	New	0	±0
Blank Seats (EB)	1,126	0.23	–0.69	0	±0
Federation of Independents of Aragon (FIA)	694	0.14	+0.04	0	±0
Communist Party of the Workers of Spain (PCTE)	564	0.12	New	0	±0
Aragonese Land (TA)	364	0.08	New	0	±0
Social Aragonese Movement (MAS)	338	0.07	New	0	±0
Blank ballots	4,265	0.89	–0.95		
Total	481,859			35	±0
Valid votes	481,859	99.44	+0.58		
Invalid votes	2,724	0.56	–0.58		
Votes cast / turnout	484,583	65.64	–0.15		
Abstentions	253,666	34.36	+0.15		
Registered voters	738,249				
Sources
Footnotes: ^{1} We Can–Equo results are compared to the combined totals of We Can and Equo in the 2015 election.

=== 2015 ===
Summary of the 24 May 2015 Cortes of Aragon election results in Zaragoza
Parties and alliances	Popular vote			Seats	
Parties and alliances	Votes	%	±pp	Total	+/−
People's Party (PP)	132,866	27.81	–13.03	11	–6
We Can (Podemos)	103,873	21.74	New	8	+8
Spanish Socialist Workers' Party (PSOE)	96,229	20.14	–8.03	8	–3
Citizens–Party of the Citizenry (C's)	47,849	10.01	New	3	+3
Aragonese Party (PAR)	24,997	5.23	–1.94	2	±0
Aragonese Union (CHA)	24,470	5.12	–4.15	2	–1
United Left of Aragon (IU)	20,903	4.37	–2.09	1	–1
Union, Progress and Democracy (UPyD)	5,073	1.06	–1.72	0	±0
Blank Seats (EB)	4,419	0.92	New	0	±0
Animalist Party Against Mistreatment of Animals (PACMA)	3,946	0.83	+0.50	0	±0
Commitment with Aragon (CCA)	1,290	0.27	+0.01	0	±0
Equo (Equo)	818	0.17	New	0	±0
Zero Cuts (Recortes Cero)	815	0.17	+0.09	0	±0
Aragonese Bloc (BAR)	520	0.11	New	0	±0
Federation of Independents of Aragon (FIA)	496	0.10	–0.06	0	±0
Communist Party of the Peoples of Spain (PCPE)	495	0.10	New	0	±0
Blank ballots	8,781	1.84	–1.41		
Total	477,840			35	±0
Valid votes	477,840	98.61	+0.31		
Invalid votes	5,500	1.14	–0.31		
Votes cast / turnout	483,340	65.79	–1.05		
Abstentions	251,382	34.21	+1.05		
Registered voters	734,722				

=== 2011 ===
Summary of the 22 May 2011 Cortes of Aragon election results in Zaragoza
Parties and alliances	Popular vote			Seats	
Parties and alliances	Votes	%	±pp	Total	+/−
People's Party (PP)	195,724	40.84	+9.31	17	+5
Spanish Socialist Workers' Party (PSOE)	135,013	28.17	–13.04	11	–4
Aragonese Union (CHA)	44,443	9.27	+0.54	3	±0
Aragonese Party (PAR)	34,342	7.17	–3.46	2	–2
United Left of Aragon (IU)	30,983	6.46	+1.53	2	+1
Union, Progress and Democracy (UPyD)	13,345	2.78	New	0	±0
Greens–Ecolo (V–Ecolo)^{1}	3,014	0.63	–0.06	0	±0
Anti-Bullfighting Party Against Mistreatment of Animals (PACMA)	1,591	0.33	New	0	±0
Commitment with Aragon (CCA)	1,245	0.26	New	0	±0
Federation of Independents of Aragon (FIA)	746	0.16	New	0	±0
Aragonese Land (TA)	698	0.15	New	0	±0
Aragon United Citizens Party (pCUA)	573	0.12	–0.28	0	±0
Family and Life Party (PFyV)	525	0.11	–0.06	0	±0
Humanist Party (PH)	440	0.09	–0.03	0	±0
Communist Unification of Spain (UCE)	398	0.08	New	0	±0
Liberal Democratic Centre (CDL)	386	0.08	New	0	±0
The Independent Voice of Aragon (L'VIA)	249	0.05	New	0	±0
Blank ballots	15,559	3.25	+0.91		
Total	479,274			35	±0
Valid votes	479,274	98.55	–0.80		
Invalid votes	7,043	1.45	+0.80		
Votes cast / turnout	486,317	66.84	+2.26		
Abstentions	241,317	33.16	–2.26		
Registered voters	727,634				
Sources
Footnotes: ^{1} Greens–Ecolo results are compared to The Greens–Federation of Independents of Aragon totals in the 2007 election.

=== 2007 ===
Summary of the 27 May 2007 Cortes of Aragon election results in Zaragoza
Parties and alliances	Popular vote			Seats	
Parties and alliances	Votes	%	±pp	Total	+/−
Spanish Socialist Workers' Party (PSOE)	191,962	41.21	+3.85	15	+1
People's Party (PP)	146,882	31.53	+1.03	12	+1
Aragonese Party (PAR)	49,508	10.63	+0.94	4	+1
Aragonese Union (CHA)	40,642	8.73	–6.99	3	–3
United Left of Aragon (IU)	19,450	4.18	+1.01	1	±0
The Greens–Federation of Independents of Aragon (LV–FIA)^{1}	3,221	0.69	+0.08	0	±0
Aragon United Citizens Party (pCUA)	1,872	0.40	New	0	±0
Family and Life Party (PFyV)	784	0.17	–0.03	0	±0
Humanist Party (PH)	577	0.12	+0.06	0	±0
Blank ballots	10,884	2.34	+0.14		
Total	465,782			35	±0
Valid votes	465,782	99.35	–0.08		
Invalid votes	3,065	0.65	+0.08		
Votes cast / turnout	468,847	64.58	–4.77		
Abstentions	257,144	35.42	+4.77		
Registered voters	725,991				
Sources
Footnotes: ^{1} The Greens–Federation of Independents of Aragon results are compared to The Greens–SOS Nature totals in the 2003 election.

=== 2003 ===
Summary of the 25 May 2003 Cortes of Aragon election results in Zaragoza
Parties and alliances	Popular vote			Seats	
Parties and alliances	Votes	%	±pp	Total	+/−
Spanish Socialist Workers' Party (PSOE)	187,087	37.36	+7.59	14	+3
People's Party (PP)	152,708	30.50	–8.52	11	–3
Aragonese Union (CHA)	78,698	15.72	+2.90	6	+2
Aragonese Party (PAR)	48,511	9.69	–2.00	3	–1
United Left of Aragon (IU)	15,363	3.07	–0.83	1	±0
The Greens–SOS Nature (LV–SOS)^{1}	3,070	0.61	+0.01	0	±0
Aragonese Initiative (INAR)	1,434	0.29	New	0	±0
Democratic and Social Centre (CDS)	1,056	0.21	New	0	±0
Family and Life Party (PFyV)	996	0.20	New	0	±0
Republican Left (IR)	519	0.10	New	0	±0
Humanist Party (PH)	280	0.06	–0.10	0	±0
Blank ballots	10,996	2.20	+0.15		
Total	500,718			35	+1
Valid votes	500,718	99.43	+0.06		
Invalid votes	2,873	0.57	–0.06		
Votes cast / turnout	503,591	69.35	+6.42		
Abstentions	222,529	30.65	–6.42		
Registered voters	726,120				
Sources
Footnotes: ^{1} The Greens–SOS Nature results are compared to SOS Nature totals in the 1999 election.

=== 1999 ===
Summary of the 13 June 1999 Cortes of Aragon election results in Zaragoza
Parties and alliances	Popular vote			Seats	
Parties and alliances	Votes	%	±pp	Total	+/−
People's Party (PP)	175,792	39.02	+1.00	14	+1
Spanish Socialist Workers' Party (PSOE)	134,113	29.77	+6.65	11	+3
Aragonese Union (CHA)	57,763	12.82	+7.29	4	+2
Aragonese Party (PAR)	52,662	11.69	–8.87	4	–3
United Left of Aragon (IU)	17,558	3.90	–6.56	1	–2
SOS Nature (SOS)	2,709	0.60	New	0	±0
Humanist Party (PH)	701	0.16	New	0	±0
Blank ballots	9,224	2.05	+0.46		
Total	450,522			34	+1
Valid votes	450,522	99.37	–0.07		
Invalid votes	2,841	0.63	+0.07		
Votes cast / turnout	453,363	62.93	–7.37		
Abstentions	267,030	37.07	+7.37		
Registered voters	720,393				

=== 1995 ===
Summary of the 28 May 1995 Cortes of Aragon election results in Zaragoza
Parties and alliances	Popular vote			Seats	
Parties and alliances	Votes	%	±pp	Total	+/−
People's Party (PP)	186,240	38.02	+19.35	13	+6
Spanish Socialist Workers' Party (PSOE)	113,254	23.12	–17.96	8	–7
Aragonese Party (PAR)	100,693	20.56	–4.94	7	–2
United Left of Aragon (IU)	51,220	10.46	+2.94	3	+1
Aragonese Union (CHA)	27,106	5.53	+3.33	2	+2
Platform of Independents of Spain (PIE)	1,980	0.40	New	0	±0
Aragonese Unity (UA)	1,058	0.22	New	0	±0
Spanish Phalanx of the CNSO (FE–JONS)	445	0.09	New	0	±0
Blank ballots	7,797	1.59	+0.22		
Total	489,793			33	±0
Valid votes	489,793	99.44	+0.10		
Invalid votes	2,741	0.56	–0.10		
Votes cast / turnout	492,534	70.30	+7.78		
Abstentions	208,074	29.70	–7.78		
Registered voters	700,608				

=== 1991 ===
Summary of the 26 May 1991 Cortes of Aragon election results in Zaragoza
Parties and alliances	Popular vote			Seats	
Parties and alliances	Votes	%	±pp	Total	+/−
Spanish Socialist Workers' Party (PSOE)	170,139	41.08	+5.54	15	+2
Aragonese Party (PAR)	105,643	25.50	–5.43	9	–2
People's Party (PP)^{1}	77,348	18.67	+4.59	7	+2
Aragon Alternative Convergence–United Left (CAA–IU)	31,140	7.52	+2.30	2	+1
Democratic and Social Centre (CDS)	10,699	2.58	–7.22	0	–3
Aragonese Union (CHA)	9,128	2.20	+1.36	0	±0
Independent Aragonese Party (PAI)	1,882	0.45	New	0	±0
Workers' Socialist Party (PST)	1,549	0.37	New	0	±0
Social Aragonese Movement (MAS)	1,032	0.25	New	0	±0
Blank ballots	5,655	1.37	–0.05		
Total	414,215			33	±0
Valid votes	414,215	99.34	+0.53		
Invalid votes	2,755	0.66	–0.53		
Votes cast / turnout	416,970	62.27	–7.00		
Abstentions	252,668	37.73	+7.00		
Registered voters	669,638				
Sources
Footnotes: ^{1} People's Party results are compared to the combined totals of People's Alliance and People's Democratic Party–Centrists of Aragon in the 1987 election.

=== 1987 ===
Summary of the 10 June 1987 Cortes of Aragon election results in Zaragoza
Parties and alliances	Popular vote			Seats	
Parties and alliances	Votes	%	±pp	Total	+/−
Spanish Socialist Workers' Party (PSOE)	155,566	35.54	–12.29	13	–3
Regionalist Aragonese Party (PAR)	135,412	30.93	+8.89	11	+4
People's Alliance (AP)^{1}	58,161	13.29	n/a	5	±0
Democratic and Social Centre (CDS)	42,887	9.80	+6.78	3	+2
Aragon Alternative Convergence–United Left (CAA–IU)^{2}	22,868	5.22	+0.98	1	±0
Workers' Party of Spain–Communist Unity (PTE–UC)	6,614	1.51	New	0	±0
Aragonese Union (UA/CHA)	3,695	0.84	New	0	±0
People's Democratic Party–Centrists of Aragon (PDP)^{1}	3,437	0.79	n/a	0	–2
Humanist Platform (PH)	1,782	0.41	New	0	±0
Republican Popular Unity (UPR)	1,116	0.25	New	0	±0
Blank ballots	6,209	1.42	+0.81		
Total	437,747			33	+1
Valid votes	437,747	98.81	+0.13		
Invalid votes	5,255	1.19	–0.13		
Votes cast / turnout	443,002	69.27	+3.06		
Abstentions	196,537	30.73	–3.06		
Registered voters	639,539				
Sources
Footnotes: ^{1} Within the People's Coalition alliance in the 1983 election.; ^{2} Aragon Alternative Convergence–United Left results are compared to Communist Party of Spain totals in the 1983 election.

=== 1983 ===
Summary of the 8 May 1983 Cortes of Aragon election results in Zaragoza
Parties and alliances	Popular vote			Seats	
Parties and alliances	Votes	%	±pp	Total	+/−
Spanish Socialist Workers' Party (PSOE)	195,215	47.83	n/a	16	n/a
Regionalist Aragonese Party (PAR)	89,970	22.04	n/a	7	n/a
People's Coalition (AP–PDP–UL)	80,694	19.77	n/a	7	n/a
Communist Party of Spain (PCE)	17,305	4.24	n/a	1	n/a
Democratic and Social Centre (CDS)	12,307	3.02	n/a	1	n/a
United Left of Aragon (MCA–LCR)	4,100	1.00	n/a	0	n/a
Workers' Socialist Party (PST)	3,406	0.83	n/a	0	n/a
Social Aragonese Movement (MAS)	1,381	0.34	n/a	0	n/a
Communist Party of Aragon (PCA)	1,285	0.31	n/a	0	n/a
Blank ballots	2,481	0.61	n/a		
Total	408,144			32	n/a
Valid votes	408,144	98.68	n/a		
Invalid votes	5,462	1.32	n/a		
Votes cast / turnout	413,606	66.21	n/a		
Abstentions	211,053	33.79	n/a		
Registered voters	624,659				

== Bibliography ==
- Real Decreto-ley 20/1977, de 18 de marzo, sobre Normas Electorales (Royal Decree-Law 20/1977). Official State Gazette (in Spanish). 18 March 1977. BOE-A-1977-7445.
- Ley Orgánica 8/1982, de 10 de agosto, de Estatuto de Autonomía de Aragón (Organic Law 8/1982). Official State Gazette (in Spanish). 10 August 1982. BOE-A-1982-20819.
- Decreto 24/83, de 9 de marzo, de la Diputación General de Aragón por el que se convocan elecciones a Cortes de Aragón (Decree). Official Gazette of Aragon (in Spanish). 10 March 1983.
- Ley Orgánica 5/1985, de 19 de junio, del Régimen Electoral General (Organic Law 5/1985). Official State Gazette (in Spanish). 19 June 1985. BOE-A-1985-11672.
- Ley 2/1987, de 16 de febrero, Electoral de la Comunidad Autónoma de Aragón (Law 2/1987). Official State Gazette (in Spanish). 16 February 1987. BOE-A-1987-5339.
- Ley Orgánica 5/2007, de 20 de abril, de reforma del Estatuto de Autonomía de Aragón (Organic Law 5/2007). Official State Gazette (in Spanish). 20 April 2007. BOE-A-2007-8444.
