= 1983 Aragonese regional election =

Election in the Spanish region of Aragon

- 8 May 1983

All 66 seats in the Cortes of Aragon 34 seats needed for a majority
- Opinion polls
- Registered: 919,295
- Turnout: 613,550 (66.7%)

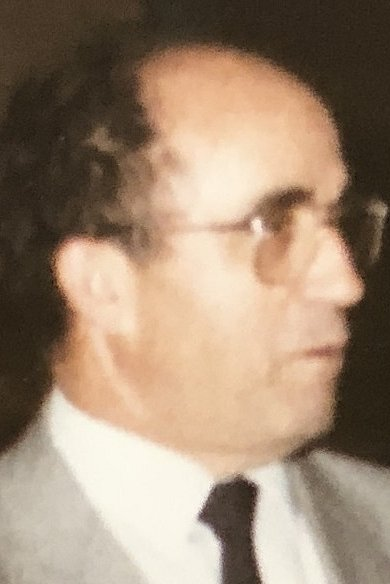

	First party	Second party	Third party
Leader	Santiago Marraco	Rafael Zapatero	Hipólito Gómez de las Roces
Party	PSOE	AP–PDP–UL	PAR
Leader since	23 November 1979	March 1983	December 1977
Leader's seat	Huesca	Zaragoza	Zaragoza
Seats won	33	18	13
Popular vote	283,226	136,853	124,018
Percentage	46.8%	22.6%	20.5%
	Fourth party	Fifth party
Leader	Adolfo Burriel	José Luis Merino
Party	PCE	CDS
Leader since	1982	1983
Leader's seat	Zaragoza	Zaragoza
Seats won	1	1
Popular vote	23,960	19,902
Percentage	4.0%	3.3%
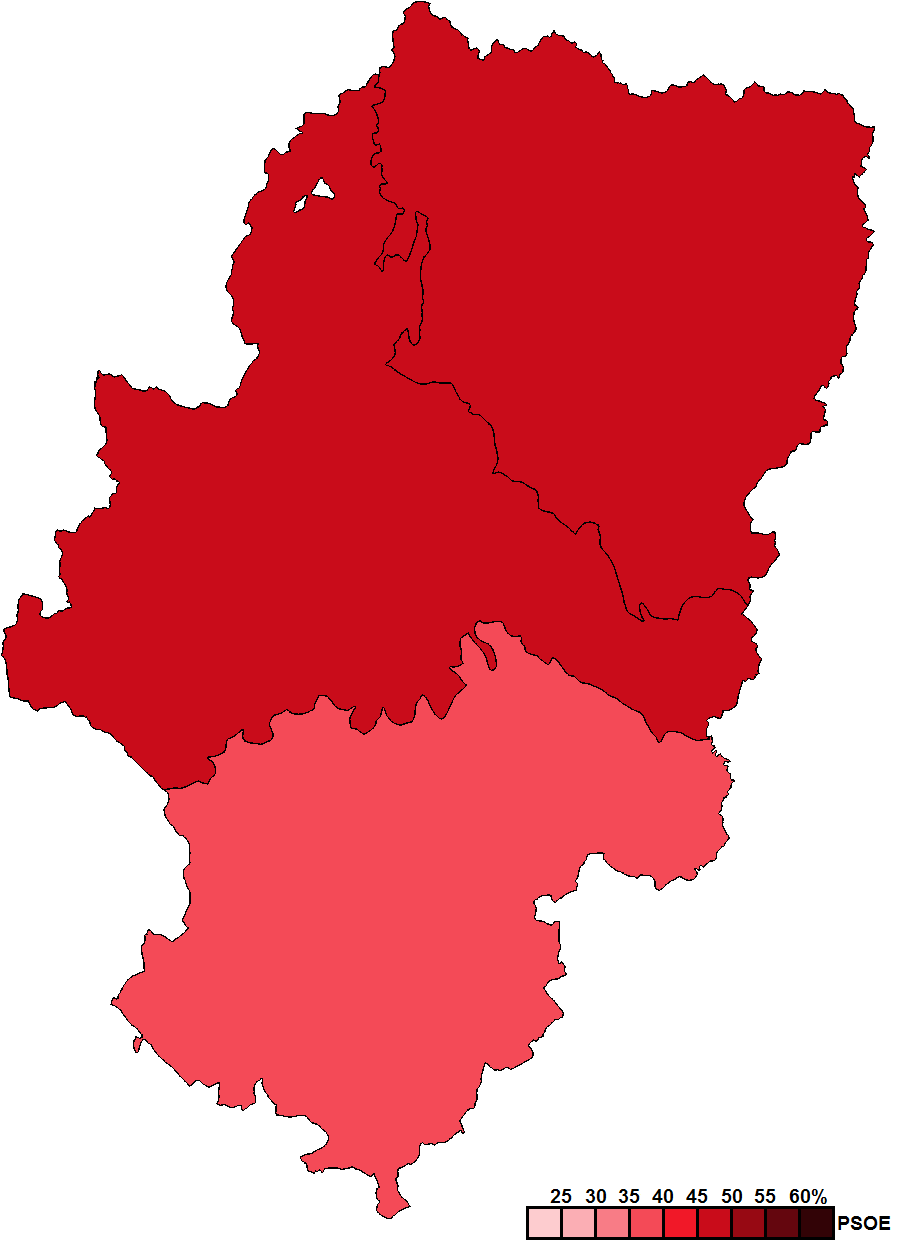
- Constituency results map for the Cortes of Aragon
President before election
Juan Antonio de Andrés
Independent (ex-UCD) (Note: The UCD was dissolved as a political party in February 1983, with its regional presidents and elected officials maintaining their offices either as independents or joining other parties ahead of the May 1983 regional elections.)
President after election
Santiago Marraco
PSOE

A regional election was held in Aragon on 8 May 1983 to elect the 1st Cortes of the autonomous community. All 66 seats in the Cortes were up for election. It was held concurrently with regional elections in twelve other autonomous communities and local elections all across Spain.

The autonomy process in Aragon had seen the then ruling party in Spain, the Union of the Democratic Centre (UCD), attempt to limit the scope of devolution so that decentralization to regions happened at a slower pace. This was met with the opposition of the Spanish Socialist Workers' Party (PSOE), the Regionalist Aragonese Party (PAR) and the Communist Party of Spain (PCE), leading to an inter-party agreement in 1981—not joined by the PAR—in favour of the application of the "slow-track" procedure for autonomy provided in the Spanish Constitution of 1978, in exchange for Aragon being guaranteed the maximum level of devolution within five years. Subsequently, the PSOE won a landslide victory in the 1982 Spanish general election with the UCD being wiped out, ultimately leading to the latter's dissolution in February 1983.

In the regional election, the PSOE came out in first place by securing exactly half the seats—33 out of 66—one short of an overall majority. The People's Coalition, a coalition of centre-right parties comprising the People's Alliance (AP), the People's Democratic Party (PDP) and the Liberal Union (UL), came second with 18 seats, while the PAR finished third closely behind with 13 seats. The PCE and the newly-established Democratic and Social Centre (CDS) both obtained one seat each. The PSOE had initially obtained 34 seats, the absolute majority, but a new count in Zaragoza following a number of claims resulted in the PSOE's 17th seat in the constituency being awarded to the People's Coalition by few votes.

As a result of the election, PSOE candidate Santiago Marraco was elected by the Cortes as new president of the General Deputation of Aragon. The election remains the only occasion to date in which a party has obtained 50% or more of seats on its own in an Aragonese regional election.

== Background ==
Aragon had been granted a pre-autonomic regime in March 1978, resulting in the appointment of the first General Deputation of Aragon with Juan Antonio Bolea at its helm. After the approval of the Spanish Constitution of 1978, the process for negotiating and approving a statute of autonomy for Aragon was initiated in September 1979, after local councils—with the support of the Spanish Socialist Workers' Party (PSOE), the Regionalist Aragonese Party (PAR) and the Communist Party of Spain (PCE)—started applying to meet the requirements set down in Article 151 of the Constitution for the "fast-track" procedure for autonomy. Political conflict arose as the governing Union of the Democratic Centre (UCD), concerned that all regions could attempt to achieve maximum devolution within a short timeframe, ruled in January 1980 that all autonomic processes other than those of the Basque Country, Catalonia and Galicia were to be transacted under the "slow-track" procedure of Article 143; the difference between both procedures being the pace in the process of devolution.

The decision caused outcry among opposition parties and led to the application process bogging down, as some Aragonese local councils had applied for Article 151, others clung on to the route of Article 143 and many others did not specify any preference, resulting in an insufficient support for either of the two constitutional procedures for autonomy. Similar complications arose in the Valencian Country and the Canary Islands, and parties agreed to hold talks to re-activate the autonomy process, leading to an inter-party agreement in May 1981—which was not joined by the PAR—in favour of the application of Article 143, as long as Aragon was guaranteed an autonomy equivalent to that provided for in Article 151 within five years, and in the drafting of a regional Statute.

Concurrently, the pre-autonomic General Deputation had seen a change in leadership in March 1981, when Juan Antonio Bolea was replaced by Gaspar Castellano. The former would end up leaving the party over disagreements with the regional government's policy both in the autonomic procedure to adopt—Bolea had been a staunch defender of Article 151's application from the beginning—and the so-called "Ebro mini-transfer" to Tarragona (Spanish: Minitrasvase del Ebro), opposed by Bolea. Further tensions within UCD over the electoral system to be established by the Statute led to an internal party crisis, which was further aggravated after the split of former prime minister Adolfo Suárez's Democratic and Social Centre (CDS). The Statute would be finally approved on 10 August 1982, coming into force on 5 September. As a result of UCD securing a majority in the newly elected Provisional Assembly, its candidate Gaspar Castellano was re-elected, this time as the first president of the autonomous community of Aragon. After the UCD's collapse in the region in the 1982 general election, Castellano resigned as regional president, being replaced by Juan Antonio de Andrés, who maintained UCD's control over the regional government until the celebration of the May 1983 regional election.

== Overview ==
Under the 1982 Statute of Autonomy, the Cortes of Aragon was the unicameral legislature of the homonymous autonomous community, having legislative power in devolved matters, as well as the ability to grant or withdraw confidence from a regional president. The electoral and procedural rules were supplemented by national law provisions (which were those used in the 1977 general election).

=== Date ===
The General Deputation of Aragon was required to call an election to the Cortes within from 1 February to 31 May 1983.

The Cortes of Aragon could not be dissolved before the expiration date of parliament, except in the event of an investiture process failing to elect a regional president within a two-month period from the Cortes's reconvening. In such a case, the chamber was to be automatically dissolved and a snap election called, with elected lawmakers serving the remainder of its original four-year term.

On 7 March 1983, it was confirmed that the first Cortes election would be held on 8 May, together with regional elections for twelve other autonomous communities as well as the regularly scheduled nationwide local elections. The election to the Cortes of Aragon was officially called on 10 March 1983 with the publication of the corresponding decree in the Official Gazette of Aragon, setting election day for 8 May.

=== Electoral system ===
Voting for the Cortes was based on universal suffrage, comprising all Spanish nationals over 18 years of age, registered in Aragon and with full political rights.

The Cortes of Aragon had 66 seats in their first election. All were elected in three multi-member constituencies—corresponding to the provinces of Huesca, Teruel and Zaragoza, each of which was assigned a fixed number of seats—using the D'Hondt method and closed-list proportional voting, with a three percent-threshold of valid votes (including blank ballots) in each constituency. The use of this electoral method resulted in a higher effective threshold depending on district magnitude and vote distribution.

As a result of the aforementioned allocation, each Cortes constituency was entitled the following seats:

Seats	Constituencies
32	Zaragoza
18	Huesca
16	Teruel

The law did not provide for by-elections to fill vacant seats; instead, any vacancies arising after the proclamation of candidates and during the legislative term were filled by the next candidates on the party lists or, when required, by designated substitutes.

=== Provisional parliament ===
The regional Statute established a provisional assembly—to remain in place until an election to the actual Cortes of Aragon could be held—which was to be made up of 66 members designated by political parties which had obtained at least five percent of the valid votes cast at the regional level in the 1979 Spanish general election (distributed by applying the D'Hondt method to provincial results). As a result, the composition of the Provisional Assembly of Aragon, upon its constitution in September 1982, was as indicated below:

Parliamentary composition in September 1982
Parties	% of votes	Seats			
Parties	% of votes	H	T	Z	Total
UCD	40.95	10	10	14	34
PSOE	28.30	7	5	10	22
PCE	7.09	1	−	3	4
PAR	6.07	−	−	3	3
AP	5.62	−	1	2	3
Total		18	16	32	66

Unlike what happened in other autonomous communities, the composition of the Aragonese regional assembly did not change as a result of the 1982 general election, despite efforts from the PAR for statutory transitory provisions to be applied extensively to recalculate the seat distribution according to the most recent general election's results.

== Parties and candidates ==
The electoral law allowed for parties and federations registered in the interior ministry, alliances and groupings of electors to present lists of candidates. Parties and federations intending to form an alliance were required to inform the relevant electoral commission within 15 days of the election call, whereas groupings of electors needed to secure the signature of at least one permille—and, in any case, 500 signatures—of the electorate in the constituencies for which they sought election, disallowing electors from signing for more than one list.

Below is a list of the main parties and alliances which contested the election:

Candidacy	Parties and alliances	Leading candidate	Ideology	Gov.	Ref.
PSOE	List: Spanish Socialist Workers' Party (PSOE)	Santiago Marraco	Social democracy	No	
AP–PDP–UL	List: People's Alliance (AP); People's Democratic Party (PDP); Liberal Union (UL)	Rafael Zapatero	Conservatism; Christian democracy	No	
PAR	List: Regionalist Aragonese Party (PAR)	Hipólito Gómez de las Roces	Regionalism; Conservatism	No	
PCE	List: Communist Party of Spain (PCE)	Adolfo Burriel	Eurocommunism	No	
CDS	List: Democratic and Social Centre (CDS)	José Luis Merino	Centrism; Liberalism	No	

The electoral disaster of the Union of the Democratic Centre (UCD) in the October 1982 general election and the outcome of its extraordinary congress held in December, in which the party's leadership chose to transform the UCD into a christian democratic political force, brought the party to a process of virtual disintegration as many of its remaining members either switched party allegiances, split into new, independent candidacies or left politics altogether. Subsequent attempts to seek electoral allies ahead of the incoming 1983 local and regional elections, mainly the conservative People's Alliance (AP) and the christian democratic People's Democratic Party (PDP), had limited success due to concerns from both AP and UCD over such alliance policy: AP strongly rejected any agreement that implied any sort of global coalition with UCD due to the party's ongoing decomposition, and prospects about a possible PDP–UCD merger did not come into fruition because of the latter's reluctance to dilute its brand within another party. By the time the UCD's executive had voted for the liquidation of the party's mounting debts and its subsequent dissolution on 18 February 1983, electoral alliances with the AP–PDP coalition had only been agreed in some provinces of the Basque Country and Galicia.

Together with AP, the PDP had agreed to maintain their general election alliance—now rebranded as the People's Coalition—for the May local and regional elections, with the inclusion of the Liberal Union (UL), a political party created in January 1983 out of independents from the AP–PDP coalition in an attempt to appeal to former UCD liberal voters. The Coalition had seen its numbers soar from late February as a result of many former members from the UCD's christian democratic wing joining the PDP.

== Opinion polls ==
The tables below list opinion polling results in reverse chronological order, showing the most recent first and using the dates when the survey fieldwork was done, as opposed to the date of publication. Where the fieldwork dates are unknown, the date of publication is given instead. The highest percentage figure in each polling survey is displayed with its background shaded in the leading party's colour. If a tie ensues, this is applied to the figures with the highest percentages. The "Lead" column on the right shows the percentage-point difference between the parties with the highest percentages in a poll.

=== Voting preferences ===
The table below lists raw, unweighted voting preferences.

Polling firm/Commissioner	Fieldwork date	Sample size	UCD	PSOE	PCE	PAR	AP–PDP–PL	CDS	PDL	Question	X mark	Lead
1983 regional election	8 May 1983	—N/a	–	30.8	2.6	13.5	14.9	2.2	0.1	—N/a	33.3	15.9
CISE–Metra Seis–ECO/CIS (Note: "Preelectoral municipales y autonómicas 1983 (VII). Aragón (Estudio nº 1352. Abril 1983)" (PDF). CIS (in Spanish). 9 April 1983. Archived from the original on 28 December 2019.)	4–9 Apr 1983	501	–	40.8	2.0	7.1	11.9	1.4	0.2	25.7	10.3	28.9
1982 general election	28 Oct 1982	—N/a	7.6	39.5	2.3	(Note: Within AP–PDP–PAR.)	24.6 (Note: Results for CD (1979) and AP–PDP–PAR (1982).)	3.4	–	—N/a	17.6	14.9
1979 general election	1 Mar 1979	—N/a	29.5	20.4	5.1	4.4	4.1	–	–	—N/a	29.2	9.1

== Results ==
=== Overall ===
Summary of the 8 May 1983 Cortes of Aragon election results →
Parties and alliances	Popular vote			Seats	
Parties and alliances	Votes	%	±pp	Total	+/−
Spanish Socialist Workers' Party (PSOE)	283,226	46.83	n/a	33	n/a
People's Coalition (AP–PDP–UL)	136,853	22.63	n/a	18	n/a
Regionalist Aragonese Party (PAR)	124,018	20.51	n/a	13	n/a
Communist Party of Spain (PCE)	23,960	3.96	n/a	1	n/a
Democratic and Social Centre (CDS)	19,902	3.29	n/a	1	n/a
United Left of Aragon (MCA–LCR)	4,645	0.77	n/a	0	n/a
Workers' Socialist Party (PST)	4,289	0.71	n/a	0	n/a
Social Aragonese Movement (MAS)	1,381	0.23	n/a	0	n/a
Liberal Democratic Party (PDL)	1,341	0.22	n/a	0	n/a
Communist Party of Aragon (PCA)	1,285	0.21	n/a	0	n/a
Blank ballots	3,918	0.65	n/a		
Total	604,818			66	n/a
Valid votes	604,818	98.58	n/a		
Invalid votes	8,732	1.42	n/a		
Votes cast / turnout	613,550	66.74	n/a		
Abstentions	305,745	33.26	n/a		
Registered voters	919,295				

Popular vote
PSOE	46.83%
AP–PDP–UL	22.63%
PAR	20.51%
PCE	3.96%
CDS	3.29%
Others	2.14%
Blank ballots	0.65%

Seats
PSOE	50.00%
AP–PDP–UL	27.27%
PAR	19.70%
PCE	1.51%
CDS	1.51%

=== Distribution by constituency ===
Constituency	PSOE		CP		PAR		PCE		CDS	
Constituency	%	S	%	S	%	S	%	S	%	S
Huesca	49.1	10	27.1	6	13.1	2	4.5	−	3.7	−
Teruel	38.5	7	30.7	5	23.4	4	1.8	−	4.2	−
Zaragoza	47.8	16	19.8	7	22.0	7	4.2	1	3.0	1
Total	46.8	33	22.6	18	20.5	13	4.0	1	3.3	1

== Aftermath ==
=== Government formation ===
On 27 May 1983, PSOE candidate Santiago Marraco was elected by the Cortes as new Aragonese president by an absolute majority of 35 out of 66, with support from both PCE and CDS and the abstention of the PAR.

Investiture; Nomination of Santiago Marraco (PSOE)
Ballot →	27 May 1983
Required majority →	34 out of 66
Yes: • PSOE (33); • PCE (1); • CDS (1)	35 / 66
No: • AP–PDP–UL (18)	18 / 66
Abstentions: • PAR (13)	13 / 66
Absentees	0 / 66

After the constitution of the Cortes, on 22 June 1983, the Zaragoza Territorial Court issued a ruling in which it removed a seat in the province of Huesca from the AP-PDP-UL coalition and granted it to the PCE. In this way, the Communist Party of Spain was left with 2 seats in the Cortes of Aragon.

== Bibliography ==
- Real Decreto-ley 20/1977, de 18 de marzo, sobre Normas Electorales (Royal Decree-Law 20/1977). Official State Gazette (in Spanish). 18 March 1977. BOE-A-1977-7445.
- Ley Orgánica 8/1982, de 10 de agosto, de Estatuto de Autonomía de Aragón (Organic Law 8/1982). Official State Gazette (in Spanish). 10 August 1982. BOE-A-1982-20819.
- Decreto 24/83, de 9 de marzo, de la Diputación General de Aragón por el que se convocan elecciones a Cortes de Aragón (Decree). Official Gazette of Aragon (in Spanish). 10 March 1983.
