= United Left of Aragon =

United Left of Aragon Izquierda Unida de Aragon
- Aragonese name: Cucha Chunida d'Aragón
- Catalan name: Esquerra Unida d’Aragó
- General Coordinator: Adolfo Barrena Salces
- Founded: 1986
- Merger of: Communist Party of Aragon; Izquierda Abierta; Communist Youth of Aragon; Republican Left; Independents; Party of Socialist Action (1986–2001); Progressive Federation (1986–1988); Carlist Party of Aragon (1986–1987); Humanist Party (1986)
- Headquarters: c/Mayor esquina c/Refugio - 50003, Zaragoza
- Membership (2015): 1.500
- National affiliation: United Left
- Union affiliation: CCOO
- Congress of Deputies (Aragonese seats): 0 / 13
- Cortes of Aragon: 1 / 67
- Town councillors: 46 / 4,155

Website
- iuaragon.org

United Left of Aragon (Spanish: Izquierda Unida de Aragón, Catalan: Esquerra Unida d’Aragó, Aragonese: Cucha Chunida d'Aragón. IUA) is the Aragonese federation of the Spanish left wing political and social movement United Left. Adolfo Barrena Salces is the current General Coordinator. The major member of the coalition is the Communist Party of Aragon (PCA, Aragonese federation of the PCE).

== History ==
In the Spanish elections of 2011 IUA made a coalition with Chunta Aragonesista, called The Left of Aragón, which gained 1 seat in the Congreso de los Diputados, rotative between the two parties.

In the Aragonese elections of 2015 IUA gained 1 MP in the Aragonese Corts.

== Electoral performance ==
=== Cortes of Aragon ===
Cortes of Aragon
Election	Votes	%	Seats	+/–	Leading candidate	Government
1987	31,352	4.90 (#5)	2 / 67	1 (Note: Compared to the Communist Party of Aragon totals in the 1983 regional election.)	Antonio de las Casas	Opposition
1991	41,367	6.74 (#4)	3 / 67	1	Adolfo Burriel	Opposition
1995	64,685	9.20 (#4)	5 / 67	2	Miguel Ángel Fustero	Opposition
1999	25,040	3.86 (#5)	1 / 67	4	Jesús Lacasa	Opposition
2003	21,795	3.06 (#5)	1 / 67	0	Adolfo Barrena	Opposition
2007	27,440	4.08 (#5)	1 / 67	0	Adolfo Barrena	Opposition
2011	41,874	6.16 (#5)	4 / 67	3	Adolfo Barrena	Opposition
2015	28,184	4.22 (#7)	1 / 67	3	Patricia Luquin	Opposition
2019	22,229	3.32 (#8)	1 / 67	0	Álvaro Sanz	Confidence and supply
2023	20,959	3.13 (#7)	1 / 67	0	Álvaro Sanz	Opposition
2026	19,832	2.97 (#6)	1 / 67	0	Marta Abengochea	Opposition

== See also ==
- United Left (Spain)
- Communist Party of Aragon
