= Communist Party of Aragon =

Communist Party of Aragon Partido Comunista de Aragón
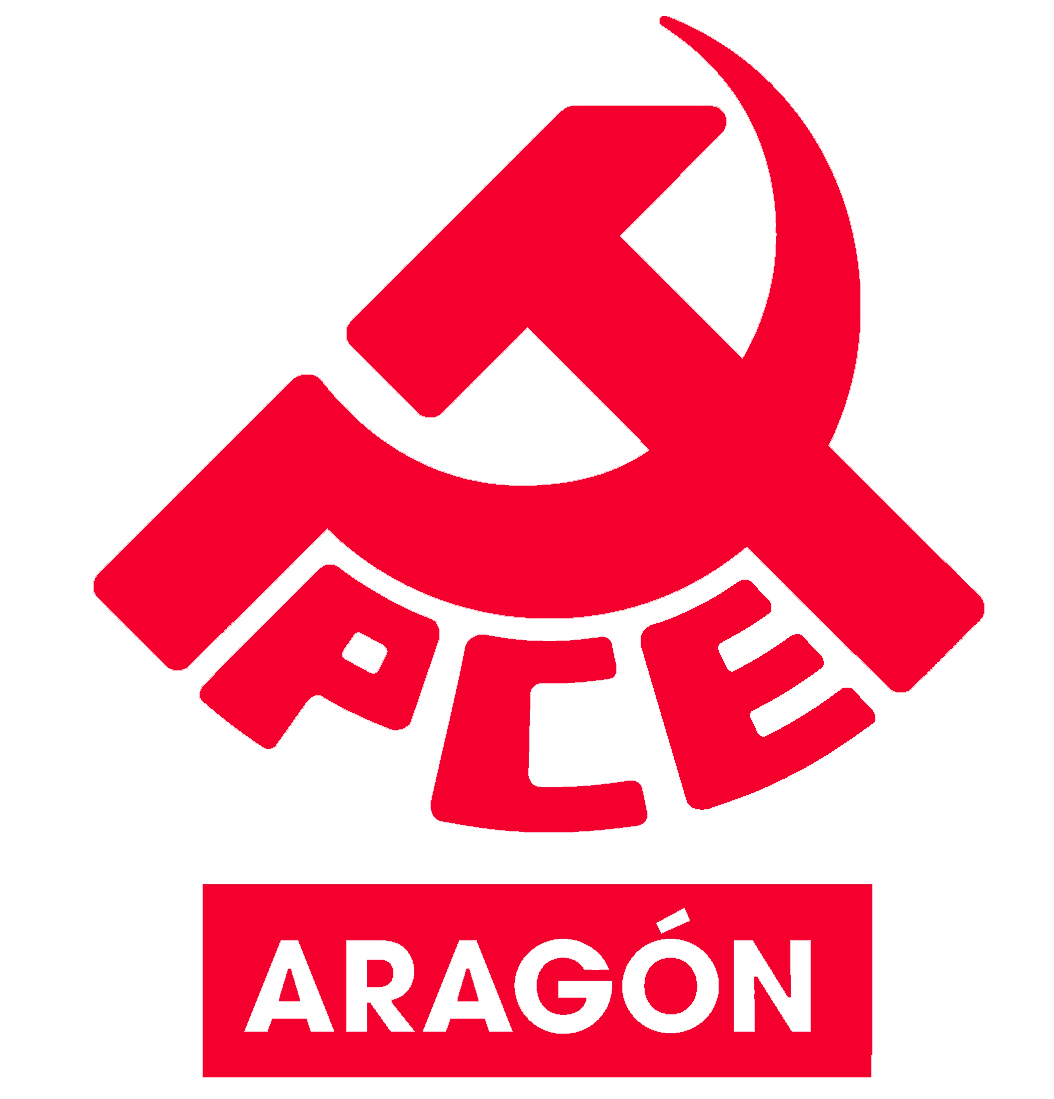
- General Secretary: Alberto Cubero
- Youth wing: Communist Youth of Spain in Aragón (UJCE-A)
- Ideology: Communism; Republicanism
- Political position: Left-wing to far-left
- National affiliation: Communist Party of Spain
- Regional affiliation: United Left of Aragon (1986–present)
- Colours: Red
- Congress of Deputies (Aragonese seats): 0 / 13
- Cortes of Aragon: 1 / 67

Website
- aragon.pce.es

The Communist Party of Aragon (in Spanish: Partido Comunista de Aragón, in Aragonese: Partiu Comunista d'Aragón) is the federation of the Communist Party of Spain (PCE) in Aragon.
