= 2011 Zaragoza municipal election =

Election in the Spanish municipality of Zaragoza

- 22 May 2011

All 31 seats in the City Council of Zaragoza 16 seats needed for a majority
- Opinion polls
- Registered: 496,062 ▼2.5%
- Turnout: 323,083 (65.1%) ▲5.0 pp
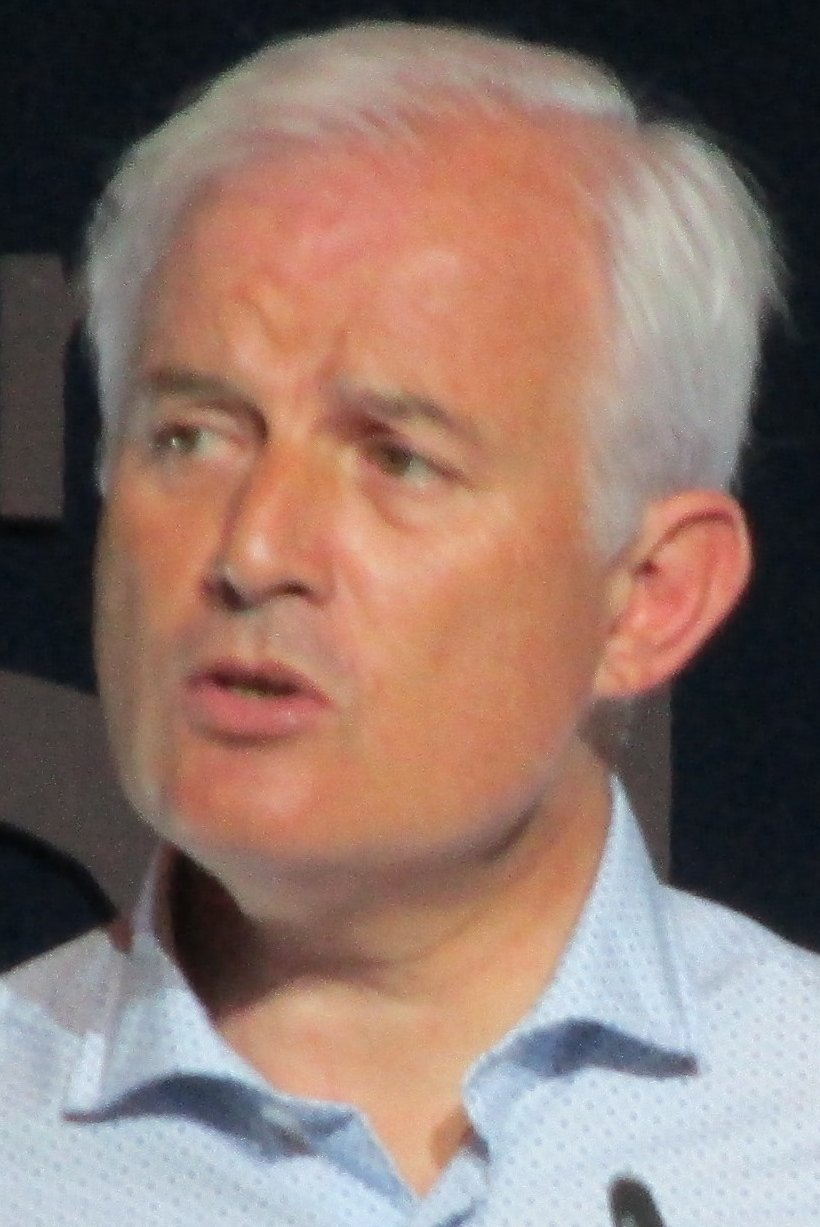

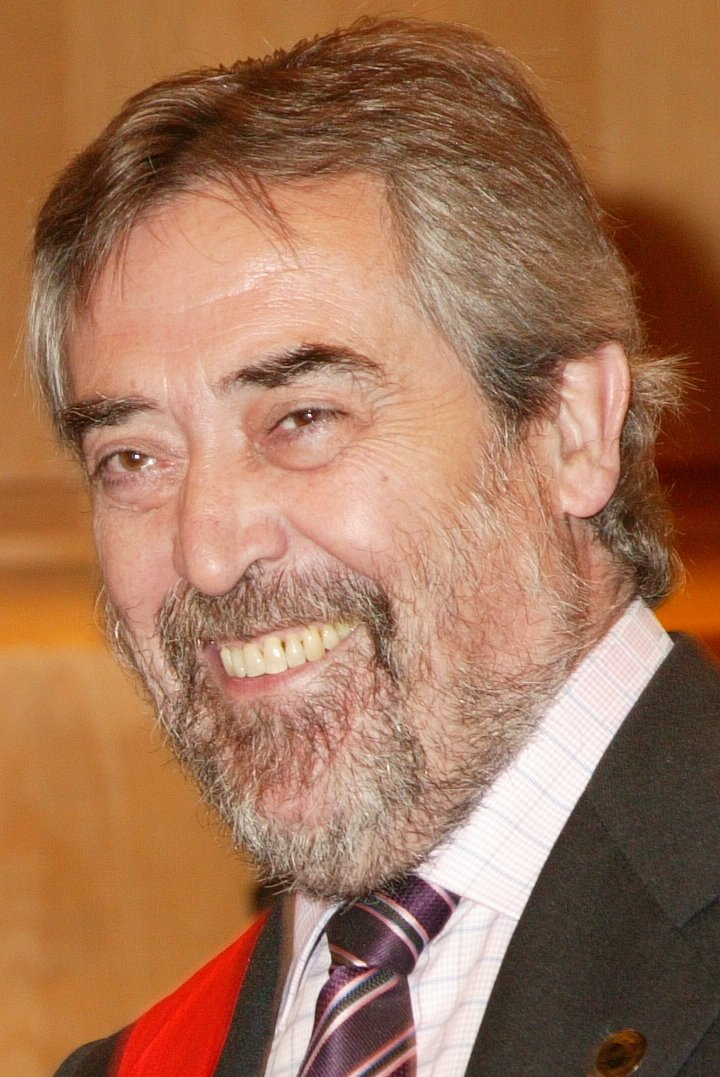

	First party	Second party	Third party
Leader	Eloy Suárez	Juan Alberto Belloch	Juan Martín Expósito
Party	PP	PSOE	CHA
Leader since	3 December 2010	27 June 1998	2011
Last election	12 seats, 33.9%	13 seats, 38.1%	3 seats, 9.6%
Seats won	15	10	3
Seat change	▲3	▼3	0
Popular vote	131,350	86,395	29,402
Percentage	41.3%	27.1%	9.2%
Swing	▲7.4 pp	▼11.0 pp	▼0.4 pp
	Fourth party	Fifth party
Leader	José Miguel Alonso	Rosa Santos
Party	IU	PAR
Leader since	2 December 2006	13 March 2011
Last election	1 seat, 5.3%	2 seats, 8.4%
Seats won	3	0
Seat change	▲2	▼2
Popular vote	25,197	14,455
Percentage	7.9%	4.5%
Swing	▲2.6 pp	▼3.9 pp
Mayor before election
Juan Alberto Belloch
PSOE
Mayor after election
Juan Alberto Belloch
PSOE

A municipal election was held in Zaragoza on 22 May 2011 to elect the 9th City Council of the municipality. All 31 seats in the City Council were up for election. It was held concurrently with regional elections in thirteen autonomous communities and local elections all across Spain.

== Overview ==
Under the 1978 Constitution, the governance of municipalities in Spain—part of the country's local government system—was centered on the figure of city councils (Spanish: ayuntamientos), local corporations with independent legal personality composed of a mayor, a government council and an elected legislative assembly. The mayor was indirectly elected by the local assembly, requiring an absolute majority; otherwise, the candidate from the most-voted party automatically became mayor (ties were resolved by drawing lots). In the case of Zaragoza, the top-tier administrative and governing body was the City Council of Zaragoza.

=== Date ===
The term of local assemblies in Spain expired four years after the date of their previous election, with election day being fixed for the fourth Sunday of May every four years. The election decree was required to be issued no later than 54 days before the scheduled election date and published on the following day in the Official State Gazette (BOE). The previous local elections were held on 27 May 2007, setting the date for election day on the fourth Sunday of May four years later, which was 22 May 2011.

Local assemblies could not be dissolved before the expiration of their term, except in cases of mismanagement that seriously harmed the public interest and implied a breach of constitutional obligations, in which case the Council of Ministers could—optionally—decide to call a by-election.

Elections to the assemblies of local entities were officially called on 29 March 2011 with the publication of the corresponding decree in the BOE, setting election day for 22 May.

=== Electoral system ===
Voting for local assemblies was based on universal suffrage, comprising all Spanish nationals over 18 years of age, registered and residing in the municipality and with full political rights (provided that they had not been deprived of the right to vote by a final sentence, nor were legally incapacitated), as well as resident non-national European citizens, and those whose country of origin allowed reciprocal voting by virtue of a treaty.

Local councillors were elected using the D'Hondt method and closed-list proportional voting, with a five percent-threshold of valid votes (including blank ballots) in each municipality. Each municipality was a multi-member constituency, with a number of seats based on the following scale (amended for smaller municipalities in 2011):

Population	Councillors
<100	3
101–250	5
251–1,000	7
1,001–2,000	9
2,001–5,000	11
5,001–10,000	13
10,001–20,000	17
20,001–50,000	21
50,001–100,000	25
>100,001	+1 per each 100,000 inhabitants or fraction +1 if total is an even number

The law did not provide for by-elections to fill vacant seats; instead, any vacancies arising after the proclamation of candidates and during the legislative term were filled by the next candidates on the party lists or, when required, by designated substitutes.

== Parties and candidates ==
The electoral law allowed for parties and federations registered in the interior ministry, alliances and groupings of electors to present lists of candidates. Parties and federations intending to form an alliance were required to inform the relevant electoral commission within 10 days of the election call, whereas groupings of electors needed to secure the signature of a determined amount of the electors registered in the municipality for which they sought election, disallowing electors from signing for more than one list. In the case of Zaragoza, as its population was between 300,001 and 1,000,000, at least 5,000 signatures were required. Additionally, a balanced composition of men and women was required in the electoral lists, so that candidates of either sex made up at least 40 percent of the total composition.

Below is a list of the main parties and alliances which contested the election:

Candidacy	Parties and alliances	Leading candidate	Ideology	Previous result		Gov.	Ref.
Candidacy	Parties and alliances	Leading candidate	Ideology	Vote %	Seats	Gov.	Ref.
PSOE	List: Spanish Socialist Workers' Party (PSOE)	Juan Alberto Belloch	Social democracy	38.1%	13	Yes	
PP	List: People's Party (PP)	Eloy Suárez	Conservatism; Christian democracy	33.9%	12	No	
CHA	List: Aragonese Union (CHA)	Juan Martín Expósito	Aragonese nationalism Eco-socialism	9.6%	3	No	
PAR	List: Aragonese Party (PAR)	Rosa Santos	Regionalism; Centrism	8.4%	2	Yes	
IU	List: United Left of Aragon (IU) – Communist Party of Aragon (PCE–A) – Revolutionary Workers' Party (POR) – Republican Left (IR)	José Miguel Alonso	Socialism; Communism	5.3%	1	No	
UPyD	List: Union, Progress and Democracy (UPyD)	Javier Puy	Social liberalism Radical centrism	Did not contest		No	

== Opinion polls ==
The tables below list opinion polling results in reverse chronological order, showing the most recent first and using the dates when the survey fieldwork was done, as opposed to the date of publication. Where the fieldwork dates are unknown, the date of publication is given instead. The highest percentage figure in each polling survey is displayed with its background shaded in the leading party's colour. If a tie ensues, this is applied to the figures with the highest percentages. The "Lead" column on the right shows the percentage-point difference between the parties with the highest percentages in a poll.

=== Voting intention estimates ===
The table below lists weighted voting intention estimates. Refusals are generally excluded from the party vote percentages, while question wording and the treatment of "don't know" responses and those not intending to vote may vary between polling organisations. When available, seat projections determined by the polling organisations are displayed below (or in place of) the percentages in a smaller font; 16 seats were required for an absolute majority in the City Council of Zaragoza.

Polling firm/Commissioner	Fieldwork date	Sample size	Turnout	PSOE	PP	CHA	PAR	IU	UPyD	Lead
2011 municipal election	22 May 2011	—N/a	65.1	27.1; 10	41.3; 15	9.2; 3	4.5; 0	7.9; 3	3.6; 0	14.2
Ikerfel/Vocento	14 May 2011	700	?	? 10/11	? 12/13	? 3/4	? 1/2	? 2	–	?
Iacom/El Periódico	14 May 2011	?	?	32.6; 11/12	38.2; 13	9.9; 3	8.1; 2	5.8; 1/2	–	5.6
TNS Demoscopia/Antena 3	10 May 2011	?	?	30.5; 11/12	39.6; 13/14	8.3; 2/3	8.9; 2/3	7.2; 2	–	9.1
A+M/Heraldo de Aragón (Note: "El PP ganaría en Zaragoza pero no gobernaría (Heraldo de Aragón)". Electómetro (in Spanish). 7 May 2011. Archived from the original on 24 July 2011.)	25 Apr–4 May 2011	1,250	?	35.4; 12/13	39.0; 12/13	8.8; 3	5.2; 1	7.1; 2	–	3.6
A+M/Heraldo de Aragón	24 Apr 2011	?	68.5	35.4; 12	36.0; 13	9.7; 3	5.5; 1	7.6; 2	–	0.6
Sigma Dos/El Mundo (Note: "Mayoría absoluta reñida en Zaragoza (El Mundo)". Electómetro (in Spanish). 7 May 2011. Archived from the original on 22 August 2011.)	15–18 Apr 2011	400	?	33.8; 11/12	40.7; 14/15	9.8; 3	5.3; 1	5.4; 1	–	6.9
CIS	17 Mar–17 Apr 2011	546	?	32.5; 11	35.7; 12	11.1; 4	8.4; 3	5.5; 1	1.8; 0	3.2
A+M/Heraldo de Aragón (Note: "Sondeo elecciones 2011 en Aragón". Heraldo de Aragón (in Spanish). 10 February 2011. Archived from the original on 10 February 2011.) (Note: "El PSOE vence por dos centésimas al PP en Zaragoza (Heraldo de Aragón)". Electómetro (in Spanish). 7 February 2011. Archived from the original on 10 February 2011.)	20–28 Jan 2011	1,000	?	37.7; 13	37.6; 12	10.5; 3	5.2; 1	7.0; 2	–	0.1
A+M/Heraldo de Aragón (Note: "El PSOE mantiene su hegemonía en Zaragoza (Heraldo de Aragón)". Electómetro (in Spanish). 13 October 2010. Archived from the original on 24 July 2011.)	13 Oct 2010	?	67.5	38.1; 13	32.9; 11	10.5; 3	8.0; 2	7.4; 2	–	5.2
A+M/Heraldo de Aragón (Note: "El PSOE mantiene 6 puntos de ventaja al PP en Zaragoza según un sondeo publicado en el Heraldo de Aragón". Electómetro (in Spanish). 24 April 2010. Archived from the original on 27 December 2010.)	5–19 Apr 2010	800	69.5	39.6; 13; 14	32.9; 11; 12	9.8; 3; 3	7.9; 2; 2	6.0; 2; 2	–	6.7
Noxa/PSOE (Note: "El PSOE sería el partido más votado en el Ayuntamiento de Zaragoza, según un estudio de Noxa Consulting". Electómetro (in Spanish). 13 April 2010. Archived from the original on 3 September 2011.)	18–23 Feb 2010	1,000	?	39.2; 13	33.1; 11	8.7; 2/3	8.3; 2/3	6.3; 1/2	3.7; 0	6.1
A+M/Heraldo de Aragón	16–27 Nov 2009	800	?	37.5; 13; 14	35.5; 12/13; 12/13	? 3; 3	? 2; 2/3	5.0; 0/1; 0/1	–	2.0
2009 EP election	7 Jun 2009	—N/a	46.2	42.5 (16)	40.7 (15)	3.0 (0)	–	4.2 (0)	4.3 (0)	1.8
A+M/Heraldo de Aragón	23 Apr 2009	?	?	? 12/13	? 12/13	? 3	? 2	? 1/2	–	Tie
2008 general election	9 Mar 2008	—N/a	76.5	46.0 (16)	36.8 (13)	6.0 (2)	3.8 (0)	3.2 (0)	1.5 (0)	9.2
2007 municipal election	27 May 2007	—N/a	60.1	38.1; 13	33.9; 12	9.6; 3	8.4; 2	5.3; 1	–	4.2

=== Voting preferences ===
The table below lists raw, unweighted voting preferences.

Polling firm/Commissioner	Fieldwork date	Sample size	PSOE	PP	CHA	PAR	IU	UPyD	Question	X mark	Lead
2011 municipal election	22 May 2011	—N/a	17.4	26.5	5.9	2.9	5.1	2.3	—N/a	34.9	9.1
Iacom/El Periódico	14 May 2011	?	20.0	23.3	5.9	4.9	3.6	–	39.0	–	3.3
CIS	17 Mar–17 Apr 2011	546	16.8	16.3	4.0	2.0	2.6	1.1	40.1	13.2	0.5
2009 EP election (Note: Does not include non-resident citizens.)	7 Jun 2009	—N/a	19.5	18.7	1.4	–	1.9	2.0	—N/a	53.9	0.8
2008 general election	9 Mar 2008	—N/a	35.0	28.1	4.6	2.9	2.4	1.1	—N/a	23.5	6.9
2007 municipal election	27 May 2007	—N/a	22.8	20.3	5.7	5.0	3.2	–	—N/a	39.9	2.5

=== Preferred Mayor ===
The table below lists opinion polling on leader preferences to become mayor of Zaragoza.

Polling firm/Commissioner	Fieldwork date	Sample size							Other/ None/ Not care	Question	Lead
Polling firm/Commissioner	Fieldwork date	Sample size	Belloch PSOE	Suárez PP	Expósito CHA	Blasco PAR	Alonso IU	Puy UPyD	Other/ None/ Not care	Question	Lead
CIS	17 Mar–17 Apr 2011	546	23.6	14.5	1.5	0.9	1.5	1.1	6.4	50.5	9.1

== Results ==
← Summary of the 22 May 2011 City Council of Zaragoza election results →
Parties and alliances	Popular vote			Seats	
Parties and alliances	Votes	%	±pp	Total	+/−
People's Party (PP)	131,350	41.26	+7.32	15	+3
Spanish Socialist Workers' Party (PSOE)	86,395	27.14	−10.92	10	−3
Aragonese Union (CHA)	29,402	9.24	−0.37	3	±0
United Left of Aragon (IU)	25,197	7.92	+2.61	3	+2
Aragonese Party (PAR)	14,455	4.54	−3.82	0	−2
Union, Progress and Democracy (UPyD)	11,401	3.58	New	0	±0
Greens–Ecolo (V–Ecolo)^{1}	1,577	0.50	−0.18	0	±0
The Greens–Green Group (LV–GV)	1,505	0.47	New	0	±0
Commitment with Aragon (CCA)	1,058	0.33	New	0	±0
Anti-Bullfighting Party Against Mistreatment of Animals (PACMA)	1,051	0.33	+0.03	0	±0
For a Fairer World (PUM+J)	587	0.18	+0.01	0	±0
Aragonese Land (TA)	499	0.16	New	0	±0
Federation of Independents of Aragon (FIA)	466	0.15	New	0	±0
Aragon United Citizens Party (pCUA)	465	0.15	−0.24	0	±0
Communist Party of the Peoples of Spain (PCPE)	384	0.12	New	0	±0
Family and Life Party (PFyV)	301	0.09	−0.06	0	±0
Humanist Party (PH)	271	0.09	+0.01	0	±0
Spanish Alternative (AES)	235	0.07	New	0	±0
Liberal Democratic Centre (CDL)	178	0.06	−0.11	0	±0
The Independent Voice of Aragon (L'VIA)	158	0.05	New	0	±0
Blank ballots	11,380	3.58	+0.81		
Total	318,315			31	±0
Valid votes	318,315	98.52	−0.93		
Invalid votes	4,768	1.48	+0.93		
Votes cast / turnout	323,083	65.13	+5.02		
Abstentions	172,979	34.87	−5.02		
Registered voters	496,062				
Sources
Footnotes: ^{1} Greens–Ecolo results are compared to The Greens–Federation of Independents of Aragon totals in the 2007 election.

Popular vote
PP	41.26%
PSOE	27.14%
CHA	9.24%
IU	7.92%
PAR	4.54%
UPyD	3.58%
Others	2.74%
Blank ballots	3.58%

Seats
PP	48.39%
PSOE	32.26%
CHA	9.68%
IU	9.68%

== Aftermath ==
=== Government formation ===
Investiture
Ballot →	11 June 2011	
Required majority →	16 out of 31	
Juan Alberto Belloch (PSOE): • PSOE (10); • CHA (3); • IU (3)	16 / 31	check
Eloy Suárez (PP): • PP (15)	15 / 31	X mark
Abstentions/Blank ballots	0 / 31	
Absentees	0 / 31	

== Bibliography ==
- Constitución Española (Constitution). Official State Gazette (in Spanish). 27 December 1978 [version as of 28 August 1992]. BOE-A-1978-31229.
- Ley 7/1985, de 2 de abril, Reguladora de las Bases del Régimen Local (Law 7/1985). Official State Gazette (in Spanish). 2 April 1985 [version as of 5 March 2011]. BOE-A-1985-5392.
- Ley Orgánica 5/1985, de 19 de junio, del Régimen Electoral General (Organic Law 5/1985). Official State Gazette (in Spanish). 19 June 1985 [version as of 30 April 2011]. BOE-A-1985-11672.
- Real Decreto 424/2011, de 28 de marzo, por el que se convocan elecciones locales y a las Asambleas de Ceuta y Melilla para el 22 de mayo de 2011 (Royal Decree 424/2011). Official State Gazette (in Spanish). 28 March 2011. BOE-A-2011-5608.
