= 2003 Zaragoza municipal election =

Election in the Spanish municipality of Zaragoza

- 25 May 2003

All 31 seats in the City Council of Zaragoza 16 seats needed for a majority
- Opinion polls
- Registered: 515,232 ▲0.9%
- Turnout: 341,039 (66.2%) ▲7.7 pp
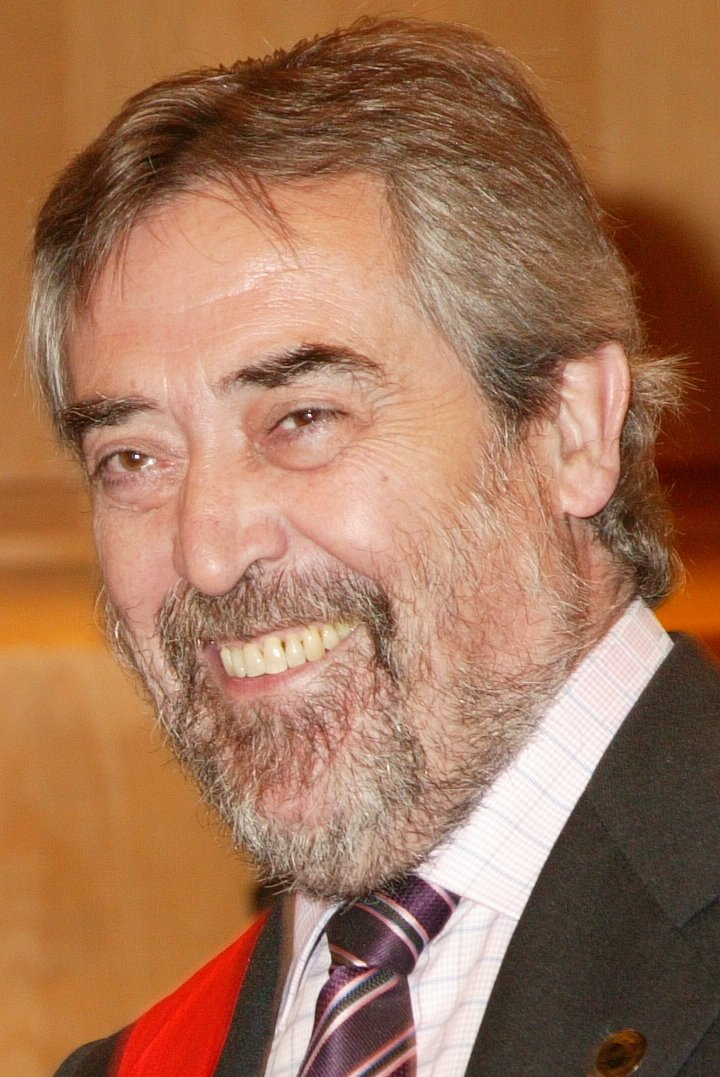

	First party	Second party	Third party
Leader	Juan Alberto Belloch	José Atarés	Antonio Gaspar
Party	PSOE	PP	CHA
Leader since	27 June 1998	4 April 2000	1995
Last election	10 seats, 29.8%	15 seats, 42.3%	4 seats, 13.6%
Seats won	12	11	6
Seat change	▲2	▼4	▲2
Popular vote	114,952	110,747	62,211
Percentage	33.9%	32.7%	18.3%
Swing	▲4.1 pp	▼9.6 pp	▲4.7 pp
	Fourth party
Leader	Manuel Lorenzo Blasco
Party	PAR
Leader since	22 October 2002
Last election	2 seats, 7.7%
Seats won	2
Seat change	0
Popular vote	23,690
Percentage	7.0%
Swing	▼0.7 pp
Mayor before election
José Atarés
PP
Mayor after election
Juan Alberto Belloch
PSOE

A municipal election was held in Zaragoza on 25 May 2003 to elect the 7th City Council of the municipality. All 33 seats in the City Council were up for election. It was held concurrently with regional elections in thirteen autonomous communities and local elections all across Spain.

== Overview ==
Under the 1978 Constitution, the governance of municipalities in Spain—part of the country's local government system—was centered on the figure of city councils (Spanish: ayuntamientos), local corporations with independent legal personality composed of a mayor, a government council and an elected legislative assembly. The mayor was indirectly elected by the local assembly, requiring an absolute majority; otherwise, the candidate from the most-voted party automatically became mayor (ties were resolved by drawing lots). In the case of Zaragoza, the top-tier administrative and governing body was the City Council of Zaragoza.

=== Date ===
The term of local assemblies in Spain expired four years after the date of their previous election, with election day being fixed for the fourth Sunday of May every four years. The election decree was required to be issued no later than 54 days before the scheduled election date and published on the following day in the Official State Gazette (BOE). The previous local elections were held on 13 June 1999, setting the date for election day on the fourth Sunday of May four years later, which was 25 May 2003.

Local assemblies could not be dissolved before the expiration of their term, except in cases of mismanagement that seriously harmed the public interest and implied a breach of constitutional obligations, in which case the Council of Ministers could—optionally—decide to call a by-election.

Elections to the assemblies of local entities were officially called on 1 April 2003 with the publication of the corresponding decree in the BOE, setting election day for 25 May.

=== Electoral system ===
Voting for local assemblies was based on universal suffrage, comprising all Spanish nationals over 18 years of age, registered and residing in the municipality and with full political rights (provided that they had not been deprived of the right to vote by a final sentence, nor were legally incapacitated), as well as resident non-national European citizens, and those whose country of origin allowed reciprocal voting by virtue of a treaty.

Local councillors were elected using the D'Hondt method and closed-list proportional voting, with a five percent-threshold of valid votes (including blank ballots) in each municipality. Each municipality was a multi-member constituency, with a number of seats based on the following scale:

Population	Councillors
<250	5
251–1,000	7
1,001–2,000	9
2,001–5,000	11
5,001–10,000	13
10,001–20,000	17
20,001–50,000	21
50,001–100,000	25
>100,001	+1 per each 100,000 inhabitants or fraction +1 if total is an even number

The law did not provide for by-elections to fill vacant seats; instead, any vacancies arising after the proclamation of candidates and during the legislative term were filled by the next candidates on the party lists or, when required, by designated substitutes.

== Parties and candidates ==
The electoral law allowed for parties and federations registered in the interior ministry, alliances and groupings of electors to present lists of candidates. Parties and federations intending to form an alliance were required to inform the relevant electoral commission within 10 days of the election call, whereas groupings of electors needed to secure the signature of a determined amount of the electors registered in the municipality for which they sought election, disallowing electors from signing for more than one list. In the case of Zaragoza, as its population was between 300,001 and 1,000,000, at least 5,000 signatures were required.

Below is a list of the main parties and alliances which contested the election:

Candidacy	Parties and alliances	Leading candidate	Ideology	Previous result		Gov.	Ref.
Candidacy	Parties and alliances	Leading candidate	Ideology	Vote %	Seats	Gov.	Ref.
PP	List: People's Party (PP)	José Atarés	Conservatism; Christian democracy	42.3%	15	Yes	
PSOE	List: Spanish Socialist Workers' Party (PSOE)	Juan Alberto Belloch	Social democracy	29.8%	10	No	
CHA	List: Aragonese Union (CHA)	Antonio Gaspar	Aragonese nationalism Eco-socialism	13.6%	4	No	
PAR	List: Aragonese Party (PAR)	Manuel Lorenzo Blasco	Regionalism; Centrism	7.7%	2	No	
IU	List: United Left of Aragon (IU) – Communist Party of Aragon (PCE–A) – Revolutionary Workers' Party (POR) – Workers' Revolutionary Party–Revolutionary Left (PRT–IR)	Jesús Lacasa	Socialism; Communism	4.4%	0	No	

== Opinion polls ==
The tables below list opinion polling results in reverse chronological order, showing the most recent first and using the dates when the survey fieldwork was done, as opposed to the date of publication. Where the fieldwork dates are unknown, the date of publication is given instead. The highest percentage figure in each polling survey is displayed with its background shaded in the leading party's colour. If a tie ensues, this is applied to the figures with the highest percentages. The "Lead" column on the right shows the percentage-point difference between the parties with the highest percentages in a poll.

=== Voting intention estimates ===
The table below lists weighted voting intention estimates. Refusals are generally excluded from the party vote percentages, while question wording and the treatment of "don't know" responses and those not intending to vote may vary between polling organisations. When available, seat projections determined by the polling organisations are displayed below (or in place of) the percentages in a smaller font; 16 seats were required for an absolute majority in the City Council of Zaragoza.

Color key:

Exit poll

Polling firm/Commissioner	Fieldwork date	Sample size	Turnout	PP	PSOE	CHA	PAR	IU	Lead
2003 municipal election	25 May 2003	—N/a	66.2	32.7; 11	33.9; 12	18.3; 6	7.0; 2	4.0; 0	1.2
Sigma Dos/Antena 3	25 May 2003	?	?	? 9/10	? 10/11	? 6/7	? 2	? 2	?
Ipsos–Eco/RTVE	25 May 2003	?	?	? 10/11	? 10/11	? 5/6	? 2	? 2	Tie
C&J/El Periódico	12–15 May 2003	?	?	33.4; 10/11	35.0; 12/13	18.0; 5/6	7.9; 2	3.6; 0/1	1.6
Opina/El País	11–12 May 2003	800	?	35.0; 11/12	32.0; 10/11	18.0; 6	? 2	? 1	3.0
CIS	22 Mar–28 Apr 2003	472	66.0	31.2; 10	34.7; 11	17.6; 6	9.8; 3	5.5; 1	3.5
C&J/El Periódico	10–16 Apr 2003	?	?	28.9; 9/10	37.7; 12/13	16.3; 5/6	9.9; 2/3	? 0/1	8.8
2000 general election	12 Mar 2000	—N/a	71.2	48.1 (17)	26.6 (9)	15.1 (5)	3.4 (0)	4.2 (0)	21.5
1999 municipal election	13 Jun 1999	—N/a	58.5	42.3; 15	29.8; 10	13.6; 4	7.7; 2	4.4; 0	12.5

=== Voting preferences ===
The table below lists raw, unweighted voting preferences.

Polling firm/Commissioner	Fieldwork date	Sample size	PP	PSOE	CHA	PAR	IU	Question	X mark	Lead
2003 municipal election	25 May 2003	—N/a	21.5	22.3	12.1	4.6	2.6	—N/a	33.8	0.8
C&J/El Periódico	12–15 May 2003	?	17.8	19.2	–	4.2	1.9	33.1		1.4
CIS	22 Mar–28 Apr 2003	472	14.0	19.7	8.3	4.7	3.0	39.9	8.7	5.7
C&J/El Periódico	10–16 Apr 2003	?	17.0	22.2	–	5.8	–	–	–	5.2
2000 general election (Note: Does not include non-resident citizens.)	12 Mar 2000	—N/a	34.0	18.9	10.7	2.4	3.0	—N/a	28.8	15.1
1999 municipal election	13 Jun 1999	—N/a	24.6	17.3	7.9	4.5	2.5	—N/a	41.5	7.3

== Results ==
← Summary of the 25 May 2003 City Council of Zaragoza election results →
Parties and alliances	Popular vote			Seats	
Parties and alliances	Votes	%	±pp	Total	+/−
Spanish Socialist Workers' Party (PSOE)	114,952	33.90	+4.12	12	+2
People's Party (PP)	110,747	32.66	−9.64	11	−4
Aragonese Union (CHA)	62,211	18.34	+4.77	6	+2
Aragonese Party (PAR)	23,690	6.99	−0.75	2	±0
United Left of Aragon (IU)	13,474	3.97	−0.38	0	±0
The Greens–SOS Nature (LV–SOS)	2,413	0.71	New	0	±0
Aragonese Initiative (INAR)	1,110	0.33	New	0	±0
Family and Life Party (PFyV)	748	0.22	New	0	±0
Democratic and Social Centre (CDS)	636	0.19	New	0	±0
Republican Left (IR)	356	0.10	New	0	±0
Humanist Party (PH)	225	0.07	−0.18	0	±0
Blank ballots	8,560	2.52	+0.51		
Total	339,122			31	±0
Valid votes	339,122	99.44	−0.06		
Invalid votes	1,917	0.56	+0.06		
Votes cast / turnout	341,039	66.19	+7.73		
Abstentions	174,193	33.81	−7.73		
Registered voters	515,232				

Popular vote
PSOE	33.90%
PP	32.66%
CHA	18.34%
PAR	6.99%
IU	3.97%
Others	1.62%
Blank ballots	2.52%

Seats
PSOE	38.71%
PP	35.48%
CHA	19.35%
PAR	6.45%

== Aftermath ==
=== Government formation ===
Investiture
Ballot →	14 June 2003	
Required majority →	16 out of 31	
Juan Alberto Belloch (PSOE): • PSOE (12); • PAR (2)	14 / 31	check
José Atarés (PP): • PP (11)	11 / 31	X mark
Antonio Gaspar (CHA): • CHA (6)	6 / 31	X mark
Abstentions/Blank ballots	0 / 31	
Absentees	0 / 31	

== Bibliography ==
- Constitución Española (Constitution). Official State Gazette (in Spanish). 27 December 1978 [version as of 28 August 1992]. BOE-A-1978-31229.
- Ley 7/1985, de 2 de abril, Reguladora de las Bases del Régimen Local (Law 7/1985). Official State Gazette (in Spanish). 2 April 1985 [version as of 11 March 2003]. BOE-A-1985-5392.
- Ley Orgánica 5/1985, de 19 de junio, del Régimen Electoral General (Organic Law 5/1985). Official State Gazette (in Spanish). 19 June 1985 [version as of 11 March 2003]. BOE-A-1985-11672.
- Real Decreto 374/2003, de 31 de marzo, por el que se convocan elecciones locales y a las Asambleas de Ceuta y Melilla (Royal Decree 374/2003). Official State Gazette (in Spanish). 31 March 2003. BOE-A-2003-6489.
