= 1999 Zaragoza municipal election =

Election in the Spanish municipality of Zaragoza

- 13 June 1999

All 31 seats in the City Council of Zaragoza 16 seats needed for a majority
- Opinion polls
- Registered: 510,832 ▲2.8%
- Turnout: 298,639 (58.5%) ▼8.6 pp

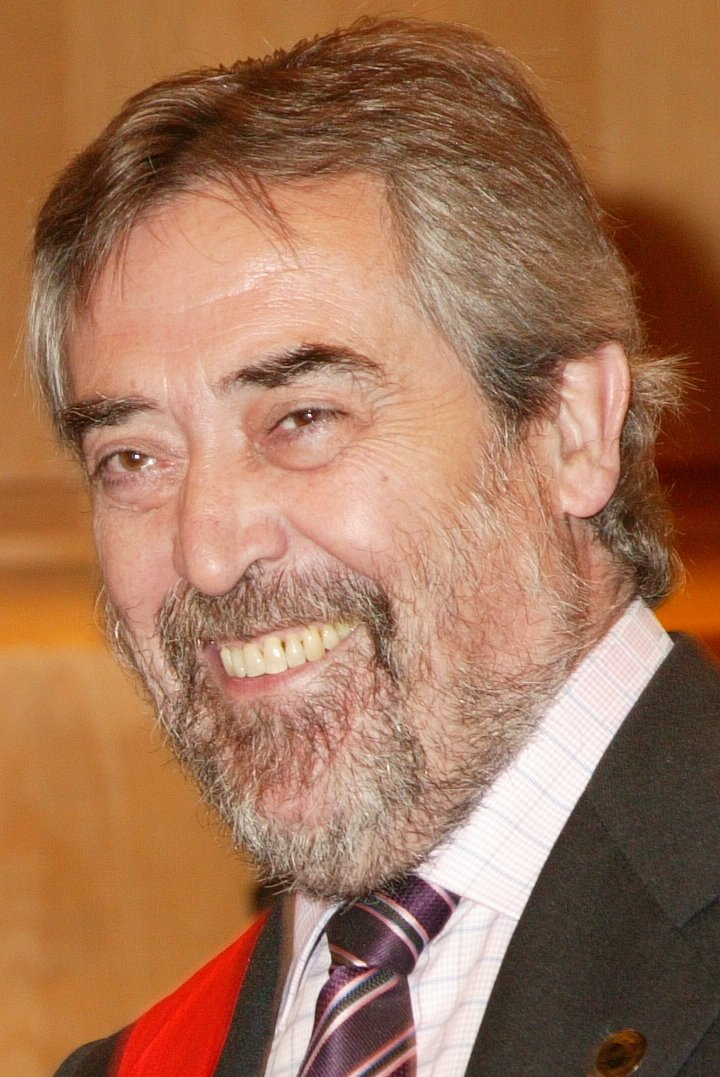

	First party	Second party	Third party
Leader	Luisa Fernanda Rudi	Juan Alberto Belloch	Antonio Gaspar
Party	PP	PSOE	CHA
Leader since	10 November 1994	27 June 1998	1995
Last election	15 seats, 46.8%	6 seats, 18.8%	2 seats, 6.0%
Seats won	15	10	4
Seat change	0	▲4	▲2
Popular vote	125,693	88,482	40,333
Percentage	42.3%	29.8%	13.6%
Swing	▼4.5 pp	▲11.0 pp	▲7.6 pp
	Fourth party	Fifth party
Leader	Fernando Labena	José Luis Martínez Blasco
Party	PAR	IU
Leader since	1999	1999
Last election	4 seats, 12.5%	4 seats, 13.3%
Seats won	2	0
Seat change	▼0	▼4
Popular vote	23,009	12,926
Percentage	7.7%	4.4%
Swing	▼4.8 pp	▲8.9 pp
Mayor before election
Luisa Fernanda Rudi
PP
Mayor after election
Luisa Fernanda Rudi
PP

A municipal election was held in Zaragoza on 13 June 1999 to elect the 6th City Council of the municipality. All 31 seats in the City Council were up for election. It was held concurrently with regional elections in thirteen autonomous communities and local elections all across Spain, as well as the 1999 European Parliament election.

== Overview ==
Under the 1978 Constitution, the governance of municipalities in Spain—part of the country's local government system—was centered on the figure of city councils (Spanish: ayuntamientos), local corporations with independent legal personality composed of a mayor, a government council and an elected legislative assembly. The mayor was indirectly elected by the local assembly, requiring an absolute majority; otherwise, the candidate from the most-voted party automatically became mayor (ties were resolved by drawing lots). In the case of Zaragoza, the top-tier administrative and governing body was the City Council of Zaragoza.

=== Date ===
The term of local assemblies in Spain expired four years after the date of their previous election, with election day being fixed for the fourth Sunday of May every four years, but a 1998 amendment allowed for local elections held in May 1995 to be held concurrently with European Parliament elections, provided that they were scheduled for within a four month-timespan. The election decree was required to be issued no later than 54 days before the scheduled election date and published on the following day in the Official State Gazette (BOE). The previous local elections were held on 28 May 1995, setting the date for election day concurrently with that year's European Parliament election on 13 June 1999.

Local assemblies could not be dissolved before the expiration of their term, except in cases of mismanagement that seriously harmed the public interest and implied a breach of constitutional obligations, in which case the Council of Ministers could—optionally—decide to call a by-election.

Elections to the assemblies of local entities were officially called on 20 April 1999 with the publication of the corresponding decree in the BOE, setting election day for 13 June.

=== Electoral system ===
Voting for local assemblies was based on universal suffrage, comprising all Spanish nationals over 18 years of age, registered and residing in the municipality and with full political rights (provided that they had not been deprived of the right to vote by a final sentence, nor were legally incapacitated), as well as resident non-national European citizens, and those whose country of origin allowed reciprocal voting by virtue of a treaty.

Local councillors were elected using the D'Hondt method and closed-list proportional voting, with a five percent-threshold of valid votes (including blank ballots) in each municipality. Each municipality was a multi-member constituency, with a number of seats based on the following scale:

Population	Councillors
<250	5
251–1,000	7
1,001–2,000	9
2,001–5,000	11
5,001–10,000	13
10,001–20,000	17
20,001–50,000	21
50,001–100,000	25
>100,001	+1 per each 100,000 inhabitants or fraction +1 if total is an even number

The law did not provide for by-elections to fill vacant seats; instead, any vacancies arising after the proclamation of candidates and during the legislative term were filled by the next candidates on the party lists or, when required, by designated substitutes.

== Parties and candidates ==
The electoral law allowed for parties and federations registered in the interior ministry, alliances and groupings of electors to present lists of candidates. Parties and federations intending to form an alliance were required to inform the relevant electoral commission within 10 days of the election call, whereas groupings of electors needed to secure the signature of a determined amount of the electors registered in the municipality for which they sought election, disallowing electors from signing for more than one list. In the case of Zaragoza, as its population was between 300,001 and 1,000,000, at least 5,000 signatures were required.

Below is a list of the main parties and alliances which contested the election:

Candidacy	Parties and alliances	Leading candidate	Ideology	Previous result		Gov.	Ref.
Candidacy	Parties and alliances	Leading candidate	Ideology	Vote %	Seats	Gov.	Ref.
PP	List: People's Party (PP)	Luisa Fernanda Rudi	Conservatism; Christian democracy	46.8%	15	Yes	
PSOE	List: Spanish Socialist Workers' Party (PSOE)	Juan Alberto Belloch	Social democracy	18.8%	6	No	
IU	List: United Left of Aragon (IU) – Communist Party of Aragon (PCE–A) – Socialist Action Party (PASOC) – Republican Left (IR) – Revolutionary Workers' Party (POR) – Workers' Revolutionary Party (PRT)	José Luis Martínez Blasco	Socialism; Communism	13.3%	4	No	
PAR	List: Aragonese Party (PAR)	Fernando Labena	Regionalism; Centrism	12.5%	4	Yes	
CHA	List: Aragonese Union (CHA)	Antonio Gaspar	Aragonese nationalism Eco-socialism	6.0%	2	No	

== Opinion polls ==
The tables below list opinion polling results in reverse chronological order, showing the most recent first and using the dates when the survey fieldwork was done, as opposed to the date of publication. Where the fieldwork dates are unknown, the date of publication is given instead. The highest percentage figure in each polling survey is displayed with its background shaded in the leading party's colour. If a tie ensues, this is applied to the figures with the highest percentages. The "Lead" column on the right shows the percentage-point difference between the parties with the highest percentages in a poll.

=== Voting intention estimates ===
The table below lists weighted voting intention estimates. Refusals are generally excluded from the party vote percentages, while question wording and the treatment of "don't know" responses and those not intending to vote may vary between polling organisations. When available, seat projections determined by the polling organisations are displayed below (or in place of) the percentages in a smaller font; 16 seats were required for an absolute majority in the City Council of Zaragoza.

Polling firm/Commissioner	Fieldwork date	Sample size	Turnout	PP	PSOE	IU	PAR	CHA	Lead
1999 municipal election	13 Jun 1999	—N/a	58.5	42.3; 15	29.8; 10	4.4; 0	7.7; 2	13.6; 4	12.5
Demoscopia/El País	26 May–1 Jun 1999	?	?	? 15	? 8	? 2	? 4	? 2	?
1996 general election	3 Mar 1996	—N/a	76.8	48.6 (16)	28.3 (9)	11.6 (3)	(Note: Within PP.)	9.5 (3)	20.3
1995 municipal election	28 May 1995	—N/a	67.1	46.8; 27	18.8; 6	13.3; 4	12.5; 4	6.0; 2	28.0

== Results ==
← Summary of the 13 June 1999 City Council of Zaragoza election results →
Parties and alliances	Popular vote			Seats	
Parties and alliances	Votes	%	±pp	Total	+/−
People's Party (PP)	125,693	42.30	−4.48	15	±0
Spanish Socialist Workers' Party (PSOE)	88,482	29.78	+10.97	10	+4
Aragonese Union (CHA)	40,333	13.57	+7.61	4	+2
Aragonese Party (PAR)	23,009	7.74	−4.79	2	−2
United Left of Aragon (IU)	12,926	4.35	−8.93	0	−4
Humanist Party (PH)	729	0.25	New	0	±0
Blank ballots	5,961	2.01	+0.31		
Total	297,133			31	±0
Valid votes	297,133	99.50	−0.01		
Invalid votes	1,506	0.50	+0.01		
Votes cast / turnout	298,639	58.46	−8.62		
Abstentions	212,193	41.54	+8.62		
Registered voters	510,832				

Popular vote
PP	42.30%
PSOE	29.78%
CHA	13.57%
PAR	7.74%
IU	4.35%
PH	0.25%
Blank ballots	2.01%

Seats
PP	48.39%
PSOE	32.26%
CHA	12.90%
PAR	6.45%

== Aftermath ==
=== Government formation ===
Investiture
Ballot →	3 July 1999	
Required majority →	16 out of 31	
Luisa Fernanda Rudi (PP): • PP (15)	15 / 31	check
Juan Alberto Belloch (PSOE): • PSOE (10)	10 / 31	X mark
Antonio Gaspar (CHA): • CHA (4)	4 / 31	X mark
Fernando Labena (PAR): • PAR (2)	2 / 31	X mark
Abstentions/Blank ballots	0 / 31	
Absentees	0 / 31	

=== 2000 investiture ===
Investiture
Ballot →	8 April 2000	
Required majority →	16 out of 31	
José Atarés (PP): • PP (15)	15 / 31	check
Juan Alberto Belloch (PSOE): • PSOE (9)	9 / 31	X mark
Antonio Gaspar (CHA): • CHA (4)	4 / 31	X mark
Fernando Labena (PAR): • PAR (2)	2 / 31	X mark
Abstentions/Blank ballots	0 / 31	
Absentees: • PSOE (1)	1 / 31	

== Bibliography ==
- Constitución Española (Constitution). Official State Gazette (in Spanish). 27 December 1978 [version as of 28 August 1992]. BOE-A-1978-31229.
- Ley 7/1985, de 2 de abril, Reguladora de las Bases del Régimen Local (Law 7/1985). Official State Gazette (in Spanish). 2 April 1985 [version as of 22 April 1999]. BOE-A-1985-5392.
- Ley Orgánica 5/1985, de 19 de junio, del Régimen Electoral General (Organic Law 5/1985). Official State Gazette (in Spanish). 19 June 1985 [version as of 22 April 1999]. BOE-A-1985-11672.
- Real Decreto 606/1999, de 19 de abril, de convocatoria de elecciones Locales y a las Asambleas de Ceuta y Melilla (Royal Decree 606/1999). Official State Gazette (in Spanish). 19 April 1999. BOE-A-1999-8719.
