= 1987 Zaragoza municipal election =

Election in the Spanish municipality of Zaragoza

- 10 June 1987

All 31 seats in the City Council of Zaragoza 16 seats needed for a majority
- Opinion polls
- Registered: 435,764 ▲3.0%
- Turnout: 291,228 (66.8%) ▲5.0 pp
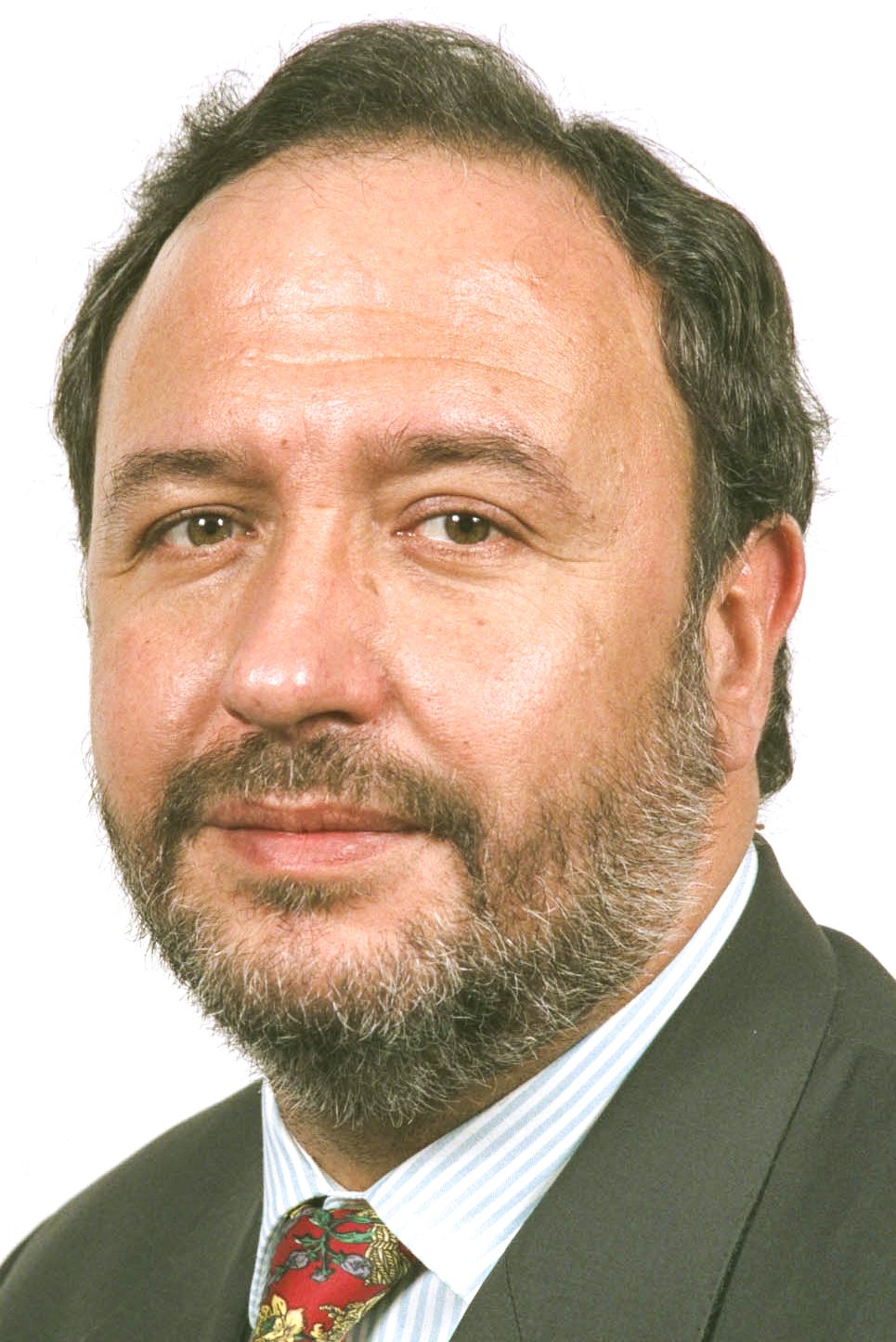

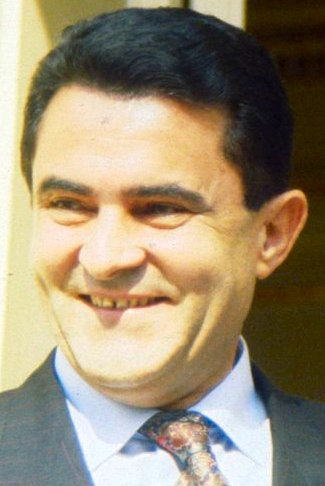

	First party	Second party	Third party
Leader	Antonio González Triviño	Emilio Eiroa	Rafael Zapatero
Party	PSOE	PAR	AP
Leader since	22 January 1986	1987	1987
Last election	18 seats, 52.4%	4 seats, 13.3%	6 seats (CP) (Note: Within the AP–PDP–UL alliance in the 1983 election: AP (6 seats) and PDP (2 seats).)
Seats won	13	8	5
Seat change	▼5	▲4	▼1
Popular vote	111,102	66,296	42,901
Percentage	38.7%	23.1%	14.9%
Swing	▼13.7 pp	▲9.8 pp	n/a
	Fourth party	Fifth party	Sixth party
Leader	Rafael de Miguel	José Luis Martínez Blasco	José Alberto García-Atance
Party	CDS	CAA–IU	PDP
Leader since	1983	1987	1987
Last election	0 seats, 3.1%	1 seat, 5.4% (Note: Results for PCE in the 1983 election.)	2 seats (CP)
Seats won	3	2	0
Seat change	▲3	▲1	▼2
Popular vote	30,831	20,650	1,697
Percentage	10.7%	7.2%	0.6%
Swing	▲7.6 pp	▲1.8 pp	n/a
Mayor before election
Antonio González Triviño
PSOE
Mayor after election
Antonio González Triviño
PSOE

A municipal election was held in Zaragoza on 10 June 1987 to elect the 3rd City Council of the municipality. All 31 seats in the City Council were up for election. It was held concurrently with regional elections in thirteen autonomous communities and local elections all across Spain, as well as the 1987 European Parliament election.

== Overview ==
Under the 1978 Constitution, the governance of municipalities in Spain—part of the country's local government system—was centered on the figure of city councils (Spanish: ayuntamientos), local corporations with independent legal personality composed of a mayor, a government council and an elected legislative assembly. The mayor was indirectly elected by the local assembly, requiring an absolute majority; otherwise, the candidate from the most-voted party automatically became mayor (ties were resolved by drawing lots). In the case of Zaragoza, the top-tier administrative and governing body was the City Council of Zaragoza.

=== Date ===
The term of local assemblies in Spain expired four years after the date of their previous election. The election decree was required to be issued no later than 25 days prior to the scheduled expiration date of the assemblies and published on the following day in the Official State Gazette (BOE), with election day taking place between 54 and 60 days after the decree's publication. The previous local elections were held on 8 May 1983, which meant that the chambers' terms would have expired on 8 May 1987. The election decree was required to be published in the BOE no later than 14 April 1987, setting the latest possible date for election day on 13 June 1987.

Local assemblies could not be dissolved before the expiration of their term, except in cases of mismanagement that seriously harmed the public interest and implied a breach of constitutional obligations, in which case the Council of Ministers could—optionally—decide to call a by-election.

Elections to the assemblies of local entities were officially called on 14 April 1987 with the publication of the corresponding decree in the BOE, setting election day for 10 June.

=== Electoral system ===
Voting for local assemblies was based on universal suffrage, comprising all Spanish nationals over 18 years of age, registered and residing in the municipality and with full political rights (provided that they had not been deprived of the right to vote by a final sentence, nor were legally incapacitated), as well as resident non-nationals whose country of origin allowed reciprocal voting by virtue of a treaty.

Local councillors were elected using the D'Hondt method and closed-list proportional voting, with a five percent-threshold of valid votes (including blank ballots) in each municipality. Each municipality was a multi-member constituency, with a number of seats based on the following scale:

Population	Councillors
<250	5
251–1,000	7
1,001–2,000	9
2,001–5,000	11
5,001–10,000	13
10,001–20,000	17
20,001–50,000	21
50,001–100,000	25
>100,001	+1 per each 100,000 inhabitants or fraction +1 if total is an even number

The law did not provide for by-elections to fill vacant seats; instead, any vacancies arising after the proclamation of candidates and during the legislative term were filled by the next candidates on the party lists or, when required, by designated substitutes.

== Parties and candidates ==
The electoral law allowed for parties and federations registered in the interior ministry, alliances and groupings of electors to present lists of candidates. Parties and federations intending to form an alliance were required to inform the relevant electoral commission within 10 days of the election call, whereas groupings of electors needed to secure the signature of a determined amount of the electors registered in the municipality for which they sought election, disallowing electors from signing for more than one list. In the case of Zaragoza, as its population was between 300,001 and 1,000,000, at least 5,000 signatures were required.

Below is a list of the main parties and alliances which contested the election:

Candidacy	Parties and alliances	Leading candidate	Ideology	Previous result		Gov.	Ref.
Candidacy	Parties and alliances	Leading candidate	Ideology	Vote %	Seats	Gov.	Ref.
PSOE	List: Spanish Socialist Workers' Party (PSOE)	Antonio González Triviño	Social democracy	52.4%	18	Yes	
AP	List: People's Alliance (AP)	Rafael Zapatero	Conservatism; National conservatism	22.3%	8	No	
PDP	List: People's Democratic Party (PDP)	José Alberto García-Atance	Christian democracy	22.3%	8	No	
PAR	List: Aragonese Party (PAR)	Emilio Eiroa	Regionalism; Centrism	13.3%	4	No	
CAA–IU	List: Communist Party of Aragon (PCE–A); Socialist Action Party (PASOC); Republican Left (IR)	José Luis Martínez Blasco	Socialism; Communism	5.4%	1	No	
CDS	List: Democratic and Social Centre (CDS)	Rafael de Miguel	Centrism; Liberalism	3.1%	0	No	

== Opinion polls ==
The tables below list opinion polling results in reverse chronological order, showing the most recent first and using the dates when the survey fieldwork was done, as opposed to the date of publication. Where the fieldwork dates are unknown, the date of publication is given instead. The highest percentage figure in each polling survey is displayed with its background shaded in the leading party's colour. If a tie ensues, this is applied to the figures with the highest percentages. The "Lead" column on the right shows the percentage-point difference between the parties with the highest percentages in a poll.

=== Voting intention estimates ===
The table below lists weighted voting intention estimates. Refusals are generally excluded from the party vote percentages, while question wording and the treatment of "don't know" responses and those not intending to vote may vary between polling organisations. When available, seat projections determined by the polling organisations are displayed below (or in place of) the percentages in a smaller font; 16 seats were required for an absolute majority in the City Council of Zaragoza.

Polling firm/Commissioner	Fieldwork date	Sample size	Turnout	PSOE	AP–PDP–PL	PAR	CAA–IU	CDS	AP	Lead
1987 municipal election	10 Jun 1987	—N/a	66.8	38.7; 13	–	23.1; 8	7.2; 2	10.7; 3	14.9; 5	15.6
Demoscopia/El País (Note: "Las disputas socialistas pueden cambiar el panorama regional y municipal" (PDF). El País (in Spanish). 4 June 1987. Archived from the original on 17 February 2016.)	22–26 May 1987	?	67	34.6; 11/12	–	25.3; 8/9	5.4; 1	19.4; 6	13.1; 4	9.3
1986 general election	22 Jun 1986	—N/a	70.4	42.3 (15)	25.1 (9)	10.7 (3)	4.5 (0)	11.8 (4)	(Note: Within CP.)	17.2
1983 municipal election	8 May 1983	—N/a	61.8	52.4; 18	22.3; 8	13.3; 4	5.4; 1	3.1; 0		30.1

== Results ==
← Summary of the 10 June 1987 City Council of Zaragoza election results →
Parties and alliances	Popular vote			Seats	
Parties and alliances	Votes	%	±pp	Total	+/−
Spanish Socialist Workers' Party (PSOE)	111,102	38.68	−13.68	13	−5
Regionalist Aragonese Party (PAR)	66,296	23.08	+9.75	8	+4
People's Alliance (AP)^{1}	42,901	14.93	n/a	5	−1
Democratic and Social Centre (CDS)	30,831	10.73	+7.58	3	+3
Aragon Alternative Convergence–United Left (CAA–IU)^{2}	20,650	7.19	+1.76	2	+1
Workers' Party of Spain–Communist Unity (PTE–UC)	4,733	1.65	New	0	±0
Aragonese Union (UA–CHA)	2,170	0.76	New	0	±0
People's Democratic Party (PDP)	1,697	0.59	n/a	0	−2
Humanist Platform (PH)	1,140	0.40	New	0	±0
Communist Unification of Spain (UCE)	741	0.26	New	0	±0
Republican Popular Unity (UPR)^{3}	683	0.24	+0.14	0	±0
Blank ballots	4,317	1.50	+1.50		
Total	287,261			31	±0
Valid votes	287,261	98.64	−1.36		
Invalid votes	3,967	1.36	+1.36		
Votes cast / turnout	291,228	66.83	+5.07		
Abstentions	144,536	33.17	−5.07		
Registered voters	435,764				
Sources
Footnotes: ^{1} Within the People's Coalition alliance in the 1983 election.; ^{2} Aragon Alternative Convergence–United Left results are compared to Communist Party of Spain totals in the 1983 election.; ^{3} Republican Popular Unity results are compared to Popular Struggle Coalition totals in the 1983 election.

Popular vote
PSOE	38.68%
PAR	23.08%
AP	14.93%
CDS	10.73%
CAA–IU	7.19%
PTE–UC	1.65%
Others	2.24%
Blank ballots	1.50%

Seats
PSOE	41.94%
PAR	25.81%
AP	16.13%
CDS	9.68%
CAA–IU	6.45%

== Aftermath ==
=== Government formation ===
Investiture
Ballot →	30 June 1987	
Required majority →	16 out of 31	
Antonio González Triviño (PSOE): • PSOE (13)	13 / 31	check
Emilio Eiroa (PAR): • PAR (8); • AP (5)	13 / 31	X mark
José Luis Martínez Blasco (CAA–IU): • CAA–IU (2)	2 / 31	X mark
Abstentions/Blank ballots: • CDS (3)	3 / 31	
Absentees	0 / 31	

== Bibliography ==
- Constitución Española (Constitution). Official State Gazette (in Spanish). 27 December 1978 [version as of 29 December 1978]. BOE-A-1978-31229.
- Ley 7/1985, de 2 de abril, Reguladora de las Bases del Régimen Local (Law 7/1985). Official State Gazette (in Spanish). 2 April 1985 [version as of 3 April 1985]. BOE-A-1985-5392.
- Ley Orgánica 5/1985, de 19 de junio, del Régimen Electoral General (Organic Law 5/1985). Official State Gazette (in Spanish). 19 June 1985 [version as of 3 April 1987]. BOE-A-1985-11672.
- Real Decreto 508/1987, de 13 de abril, de convocatoria de elecciones locales (Royal Decree 508/1987). Official State Gazette (in Spanish). 13 April 1987. BOE-A-1987-9222.
