= 2007 Zaragoza municipal election =

Election in the Spanish municipality of Zaragoza

- 27 May 2007

All 31 seats in the City Council of Zaragoza 16 seats needed for a majority
- Opinion polls
- Registered: 508,643 ▼1.3%
- Turnout: 305,722 (60.1%) ▼6.1 pp
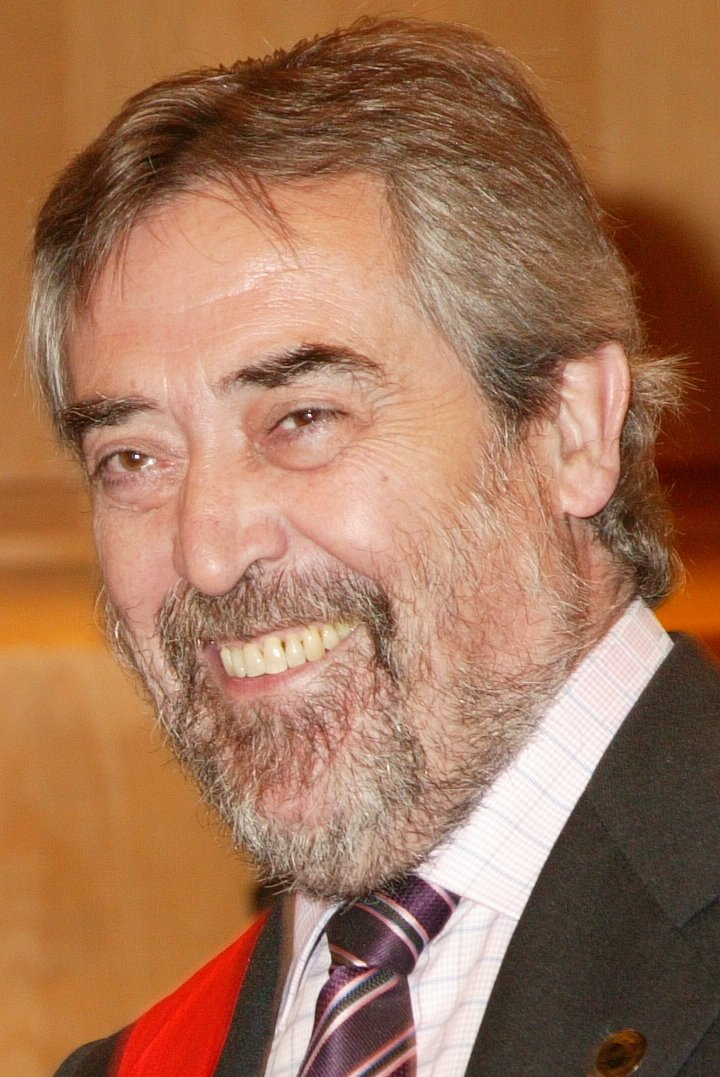

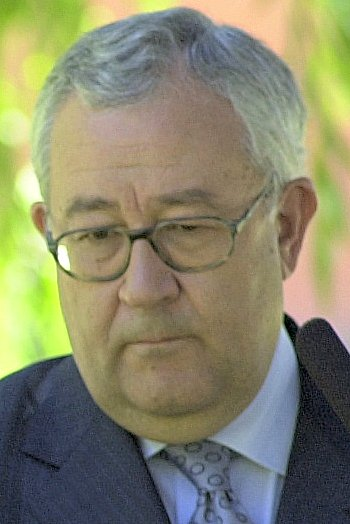

	First party	Second party	Third party
Leader	Juan Alberto Belloch	Domingo Buesa	Antonio Gaspar
Party	PSOE	PP	CHA
Leader since	27 June 1998	19 July 2006	1995
Last election	12 seats, 33.9%	11 seats, 32.7%	6 seats, 18.3%
Seats won	13	12	3
Seat change	▲1	▲1	▼3
Popular vote	115,723	103,191	29,230
Percentage	38.1%	33.9%	9.6%
Swing	▲4.2 pp	▲1.2 pp	▼8.7 pp
	Fourth party	Fifth party
Leader	José Ángel Biel	José Miguel Alonso
Party	PAR	IU
Leader since	26 October 2006	2 December 2006
Last election	2 seats, 7.0%	0 seats, 4.0%
Seats won	2	1
Seat change	0	▲1
Popular vote	25,410	16,148
Percentage	8.4%	5.3%
Swing	▲1.4 pp	▲1.3 pp
Mayor before election
Juan Alberto Belloch
PSOE
Mayor after election
Juan Alberto Belloch
PSOE

A municipal election was held in Zaragoza on 27 May 2007 to elect the 8th City Council of the municipality. All 31 seats in the City Council were up for election. It was held concurrently with regional elections in thirteen autonomous communities and local elections all across Spain.

== Overview ==
Under the 1978 Constitution, the governance of municipalities in Spain—part of the country's local government system—was centered on the figure of city councils (Spanish: ayuntamientos), local corporations with independent legal personality composed of a mayor, a government council and an elected legislative assembly. The mayor was indirectly elected by the local assembly, requiring an absolute majority; otherwise, the candidate from the most-voted party automatically became mayor (ties were resolved by drawing lots). In the case of Zaragoza, the top-tier administrative and governing body was the City Council of Zaragoza.

=== Date ===
The term of local assemblies in Spain expired four years after the date of their previous election, with election day being fixed for the fourth Sunday of May every four years. The election decree was required to be issued no later than 54 days before the scheduled election date and published on the following day in the Official State Gazette (BOE). The previous local elections were held on 25 May 2003, setting the date for election day on the fourth Sunday of May four years later, which was 27 May 2007.

Local assemblies could not be dissolved before the expiration of their term, except in cases of mismanagement that seriously harmed the public interest and implied a breach of constitutional obligations, in which case the Council of Ministers could—optionally—decide to call a by-election.

Elections to the assemblies of local entities were officially called on 3 April 2007 with the publication of the corresponding decree in the BOE, setting election day for 27 May.

=== Electoral system ===
Voting for local assemblies was based on universal suffrage, comprising all Spanish nationals over 18 years of age, registered and residing in the municipality and with full political rights (provided that they had not been deprived of the right to vote by a final sentence, nor were legally incapacitated), as well as resident non-national European citizens, and those whose country of origin allowed reciprocal voting by virtue of a treaty.

Local councillors were elected using the D'Hondt method and closed-list proportional voting, with a five percent-threshold of valid votes (including blank ballots) in each municipality. Each municipality was a multi-member constituency, with a number of seats based on the following scale:

Population	Councillors
<250	5
251–1,000	7
1,001–2,000	9
2,001–5,000	11
5,001–10,000	13
10,001–20,000	17
20,001–50,000	21
50,001–100,000	25
>100,001	+1 per each 100,000 inhabitants or fraction +1 if total is an even number

The law did not provide for by-elections to fill vacant seats; instead, any vacancies arising after the proclamation of candidates and during the legislative term were filled by the next candidates on the party lists or, when required, by designated substitutes.

== Parties and candidates ==
The electoral law allowed for parties and federations registered in the interior ministry, alliances and groupings of electors to present lists of candidates. Parties and federations intending to form an alliance were required to inform the relevant electoral commission within 10 days of the election call, whereas groupings of electors needed to secure the signature of a determined amount of the electors registered in the municipality for which they sought election, disallowing electors from signing for more than one list. In the case of Zaragoza, as its population was between 300,001 and 1,000,000, at least 5,000 signatures were required. Amendments earlier in 2007 required a balanced composition of men and women in the electoral lists, so that candidates of either sex made up at least 40 percent of the total composition.

Below is a list of the main parties and alliances which contested the election:

Candidacy	Parties and alliances	Leading candidate	Ideology	Previous result		Gov.	Ref.
Candidacy	Parties and alliances	Leading candidate	Ideology	Vote %	Seats	Gov.	Ref.
PSOE	List: Spanish Socialist Workers' Party (PSOE)	Juan Alberto Belloch	Social democracy	33.9%	12	Yes	
PP	List: People's Party (PP)	Domingo Buesa	Conservatism; Christian democracy	32.7%	11	No	
CHA	List: Aragonese Union (CHA)	Antonio Gaspar	Aragonese nationalism Eco-socialism	18.3%	6	Yes	
PAR	List: Aragonese Party (PAR)	José Ángel Biel	Regionalism; Centrism	7.0%	2	No	
IU	List: United Left of Aragon (IU) – Communist Party of Aragon (PCE–A) – Revolutionary Workers' Party (POR)	José Miguel Alonso	Socialism; Communism	4.0%	0	No	

== Opinion polls ==
The tables below list opinion polling results in reverse chronological order, showing the most recent first and using the dates when the survey fieldwork was done, as opposed to the date of publication. Where the fieldwork dates are unknown, the date of publication is given instead. The highest percentage figure in each polling survey is displayed with its background shaded in the leading party's colour. If a tie ensues, this is applied to the figures with the highest percentages. The "Lead" column on the right shows the percentage-point difference between the parties with the highest percentages in a poll.

=== Voting intention estimates ===
The table below lists weighted voting intention estimates. Refusals are generally excluded from the party vote percentages, while question wording and the treatment of "don't know" responses and those not intending to vote may vary between polling organisations. When available, seat projections determined by the polling organisations are displayed below (or in place of) the percentages in a smaller font; 16 seats were required for an absolute majority in the City Council of Zaragoza.

Polling firm/Commissioner	Fieldwork date	Sample size	Turnout	PSOE	PP	CHA	PAR	IU	Lead
2007 municipal election	27 May 2007	—N/a	60.1	38.1; 13	33.9; 12	9.6; 3	8.4; 2	5.3; 1	4.2
Opina/Cadena SER (Note: "Informe Zaragoza. Mayo 2007". Opina (in Spanish). 18 May 2007. Archived from the original on 11 July 2007.)	15 May 2007	800	?	40.0; 13/14	36.0; 12	17.0; 5/6	? 0/1	? 0	4.0
C&J/El Periódico (Note: Undecided and/or abstentionists excluded.)	7–12 May 2007	?	65.7	36.2; 12	35.3; 11	12.9; 4	13.1; 4	2.4; 0	0.9
Sigma Dos/El Mundo	2–9 May 2007	400	?	36.5; 12/13	36.3; 12/13	14.1; 4/5	6.3; 2	4.4; 0	0.2
A+M/Heraldo de Aragón	13 Oct 2005	?	?	35.1; 12	35.7; 12	16.2; 5	? 2	? 0	0.6
2004 EP election	13 Jun 2004	—N/a	45.3	45.0 (16)	39.2 (13)	7.5 (2)	2.2 (0)	4.0 (0)	5.8
2004 general election	14 Mar 2004	—N/a	77.9	39.3 (14)	34.9 (12)	16.1 (5)	3.5 (0)	3.1 (0)	4.4
2003 municipal election	25 May 2003	—N/a	66.2	33.9; 12	32.7; 11	18.3; 6	7.0; 2	4.0; 0	1.2

=== Voting preferences ===
The table below lists raw, unweighted voting preferences.

Polling firm/Commissioner	Fieldwork date	Sample size	PSOE	PP	CHA	PAR	IU	Question	X mark	Lead
2007 municipal election	27 May 2007	—N/a	22.8	20.3	5.7	5.0	3.2	—N/a	39.9	2.5
C&J/El Periódico	7–12 May 2007	?	23.8; 12	23.2; 11	8.5; 4	8.6; 4	1.6; 0	34.3	–	0.6
2004 EP election (Note: Does not include non-resident citizens.)	13 Jun 2004	—N/a	20.3	17.7	3.4	1.0	1.8	—N/a	54.7	2.6
2004 general election	14 Mar 2004	—N/a	30.4	27.0	12.5	2.7	2.4	—N/a	22.1	3.4
2003 municipal election	25 May 2003	—N/a	22.3	21.5	12.1	4.6	2.6	—N/a	33.8	0.8

== Results ==
← Summary of the 27 May 2007 City Council of Zaragoza election results →
Parties and alliances	Popular vote			Seats	
Parties and alliances	Votes	%	±pp	Total	+/−
Spanish Socialist Workers' Party (PSOE)	115,723	38.06	+4.16	13	+1
People's Party (PP)	103,191	33.94	+1.28	12	+1
Aragonese Union (CHA)	29,230	9.61	−8.73	3	−3
Aragonese Party (PAR)	25,410	8.36	+1.37	2	±0
United Left of Aragon (IU)	16,148	5.31	+1.34	1	+1
The Greens–Federation of Independents of Aragon (LV–FIA)^{1}	2,078	0.68	−0.03	0	±0
Aragon United Citizens Party (pCUA)	1,192	0.39	New	0	±0
Anti-Bullfighting Party Against Mistreatment of Animals (PACMA)	916	0.30	New	0	±0
Liberal Democratic Centre (CDL)	525	0.17	New	0	±0
For a Fairer World (PUM+J)	521	0.17	New	0	±0
Family and Life Party (PFyV)	455	0.15	−0.07	0	±0
Humanist Party (PH)	241	0.08	+0.01	0	±0
Blank ballots	8,415	2.77	+0.25		
Total	304,045			31	±0
Valid votes	304,045	99.45	+0.01		
Invalid votes	1,677	0.55	−0.01		
Votes cast / turnout	305,722	60.11	−6.08		
Abstentions	202,921	39.89	+6.08		
Registered voters	508,643				
Sources
Footnotes: ^{1} The Greens–Federation of Independents of Aragon results are compared to The Greens–SOS Nature totals in the 2003 election.

Popular vote
PSOE	38.06%
PP	33.94%
CHA	9.61%
PAR	8.36%
IU	5.31%
Others	1.95%
Blank ballots	2.77%

Seats
PSOE	41.94%
PP	38.71%
CHA	9.68%
PAR	6.45%
IU	3.23%

== Aftermath ==
=== Government formation ===
Investiture
Ballot →	16 June 2007	
Required majority →	16 out of 31	
Juan Alberto Belloch (PSOE): • PSOE (13); • CHA (3); • PAR (2)	18 / 31	check
Domingo Buesa (PP): • PP (12)	12 / 31	X mark
Abstentions/Blank ballots: • IU (1)	1 / 31	
Absentees	0 / 31	

== Bibliography ==
- Constitución Española (Constitution). Official State Gazette (in Spanish). 27 December 1978 [version as of 28 August 1992]. BOE-A-1978-31229.
- Ley 7/1985, de 2 de abril, Reguladora de las Bases del Régimen Local (Law 7/1985). Official State Gazette (in Spanish). 2 April 1985 [version as of 13 April 2007]. BOE-A-1985-5392.
- Ley Orgánica 5/1985, de 19 de junio, del Régimen Electoral General (Organic Law 5/1985). Official State Gazette (in Spanish). 19 June 1985 [version as of 20 April 2007]. BOE-A-1985-11672.
- Real Decreto 444/2007, de 2 de abril, por el que se convocan elecciones locales y a las Asambleas de Ceuta y Melilla, para el 27 de mayo de 2007 (Royal Decree 444/2007). Official State Gazette (in Spanish). 2 April 2007. BOE-A-2007-7018.
