= Borja Giménez Larraz =

Spanish politician (born 1983)

Borja Giménez Larraz MEP
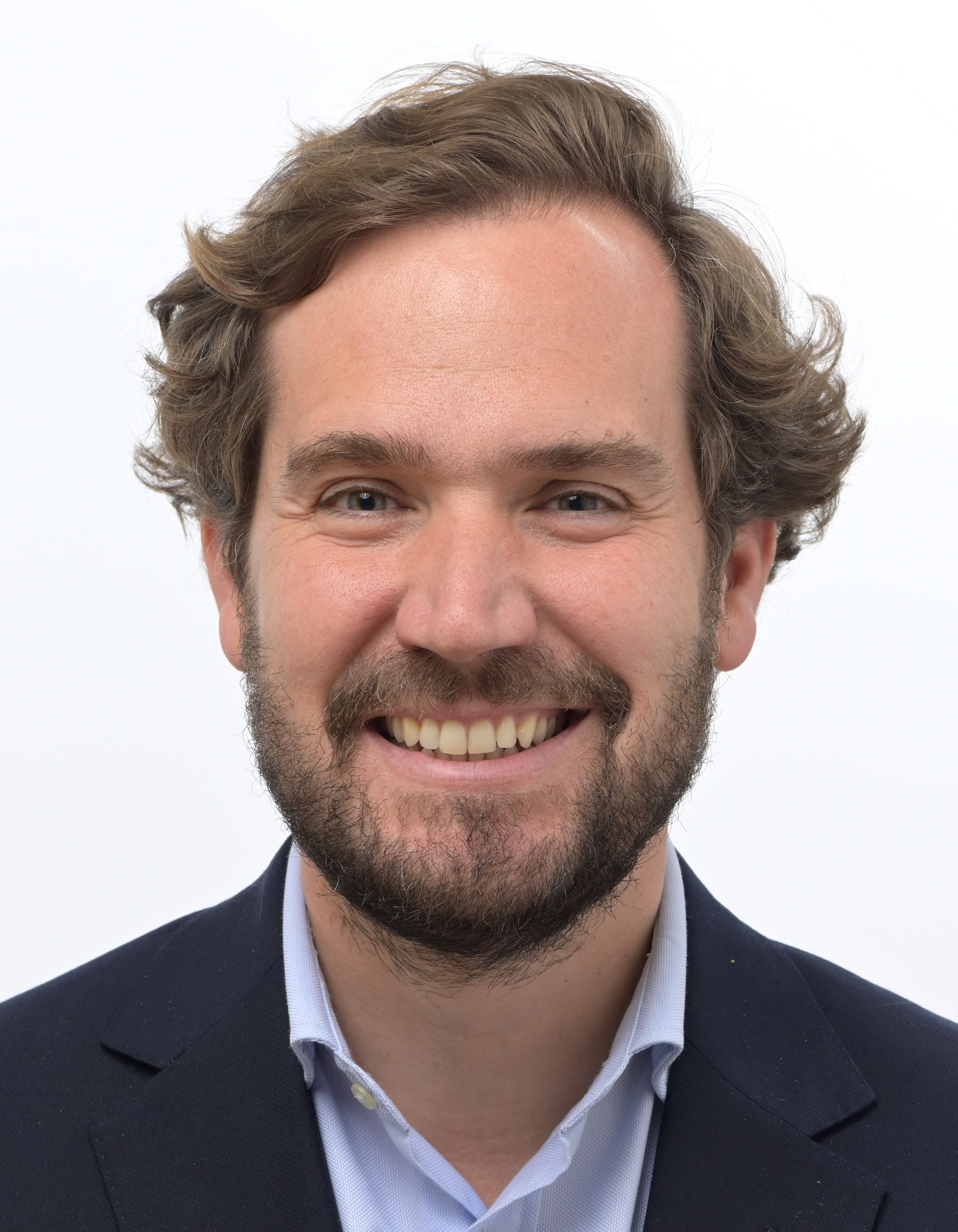

Member of the European Parliament
- Incumbent
- Assumed office 16 July 2024
- Constituency: Spain

Personal details
- Born: Francisco de Borja Giménez Larraz; 1983 (age 42–43) Zaragoza
- Party: People's Party
- Other political affiliations: European People's Party
- Parent: Manuel Giménez Abad (father)

Francisco de Borja Giménez Larraz (Spanish pronunciation: [ˈboɾxa xiˈmeneθ laˈraθ]; born 1983) is a Spanish politician of the People's Party who was elected member of the European Parliament in 2024.

== Early life and career ==
Giménez Larraz was born in Zaragoza in 1983, as the son of Manuel Giménez Abad. When he was 17, he witnessed the assassination of his father by ETA gunman Mikel Karrera Sarobe.

=== Parliamentary work ===
He served as legal advisor to the People's Party's MEPs from 2014 to 2019, and as advisor to MEP Javier Zarzalejos from 2019 to 2024.

Elected MEP in 2024, he serves in the Special Committee on the Housing Crisis in the European Union and is the rapporteur of a special report on the matter.
