= Gante (surname) =

Gante is a surname of Spanish origin. People with the surname include:

- Margarita Mariscal de Gante (born 1954), Spanish jurist and politician
- Pedro de Gante (c. 1480 – 1572), Franciscan missionary in Mexico

== See also ==
- L-Gante, stage name of Elian Ángel Valenzuela (born 2000), Argentine musical artist
