= 1991 Zaragoza municipal election =

Election in the Spanish municipality of Zaragoza

- 26 May 1991

All 31 seats in the City Council of Zaragoza 16 seats needed for a majority
- Registered: 466,213 ▲7.0%
- Turnout: 263,294 (56.5%) ▼10.3 pp
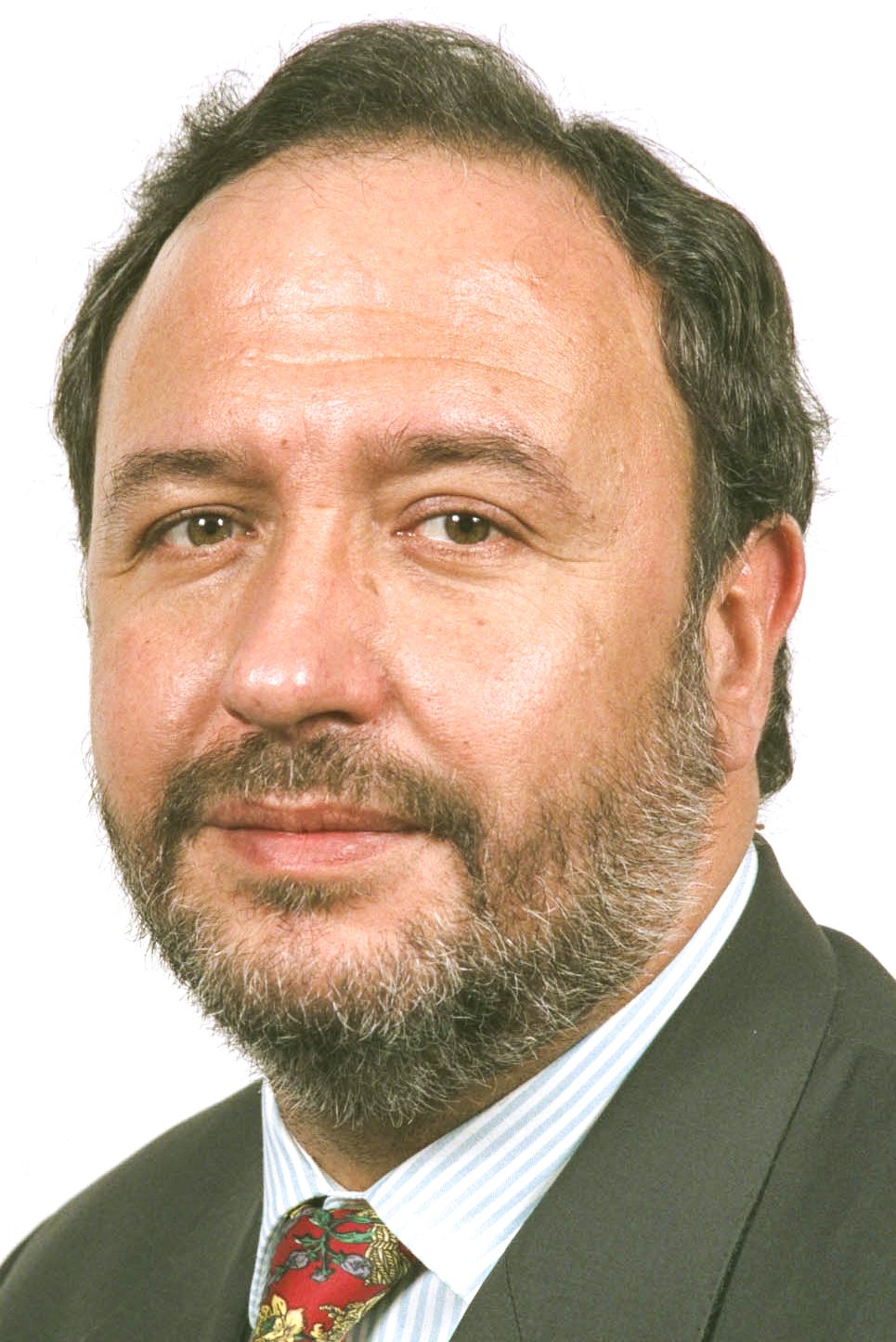

	First party	Second party	Third party
Leader	Antonio González Triviño	Ángel Cristóbal Montes	Ana María Cortés
Party	PSOE	PP	PAR
Leader since	27 January 1986	1991	1991
Last election	13 seats, 38.7%	5 seats, 15.5% (Note: Results for AP (14.9%, 5 seats) and PDP (0.6%, 0 seats) in the 1987 election.)	8 seats, 23.1%
Seats won	15	7	6
Seat change	▲2	▲2	▼2
Popular vote	112,106	56,947	47,780
Percentage	42.9%	21.8%	18.3%
Swing	▲4.2 pp	▲6.3 pp	▼4.8 pp
	Fourth party	Fifth party
Leader	Ricardo Berdié	Rafael de Miguel
Party	CAA–IU	CDS
Leader since	1991	1983
Last election	2 seats, 7.2%	3 seats, 10.7%
Seats won	3	0
Seat change	▲1	▼3
Popular vote	24,594	7,499
Percentage	9.4%	2.9%
Swing	▲2.2 pp	▼7.8 pp
Mayor before election
Antonio González Triviño
PSOE
Mayor after election
Antonio González Triviño
PSOE

A municipal election was held in Zaragoza on 26 May 1991 to elect the 4th City Council of the municipality. All 31 seats in the City Council were up for election. It was held concurrently with regional elections in thirteen autonomous communities and local elections all across Spain.

== Overview ==
Under the 1978 Constitution, the governance of municipalities in Spain—part of the country's local government system—was centered on the figure of city councils (Spanish: ayuntamientos), local corporations with independent legal personality composed of a mayor, a government council and an elected legislative assembly. The mayor was indirectly elected by the local assembly, requiring an absolute majority; otherwise, the candidate from the most-voted party automatically became mayor (ties were resolved by drawing lots). In the case of Zaragoza, the top-tier administrative and governing body was the City Council of Zaragoza.

=== Date ===
The term of local assemblies in Spain expired four years after the date of their previous election, with amendments earlier in 1991 fixing election day for the fourth Sunday of May every four years. The election decree was required to be issued between 54 and 60 days before the scheduled election date and published on the following day in the Official State Gazette (BOE). The previous local elections were held on 10 June 1987, setting the date for election day on the fourth Sunday of May four years later, which was 26 May 1991.

Local assemblies could not be dissolved before the expiration of their term, except in cases of mismanagement that seriously harmed the public interest and implied a breach of constitutional obligations, in which case the Council of Ministers could—optionally—decide to call a by-election.

Elections to the assemblies of local entities were officially called on 2 April 1991 with the publication of the corresponding decree in the BOE, setting election day for 26 May.

=== Electoral system ===
Voting for local assemblies was based on universal suffrage, comprising all Spanish nationals over 18 years of age, registered and residing in the municipality and with full political rights (provided that they had not been deprived of the right to vote by a final sentence, nor were legally incapacitated), as well as resident non-nationals whose country of origin allowed reciprocal voting by virtue of a treaty.

Local councillors were elected using the D'Hondt method and closed-list proportional voting, with a five percent-threshold of valid votes (including blank ballots) in each municipality. Each municipality was a multi-member constituency, with a number of seats based on the following scale:

Population	Councillors
<250	5
251–1,000	7
1,001–2,000	9
2,001–5,000	11
5,001–10,000	13
10,001–20,000	17
20,001–50,000	21
50,001–100,000	25
>100,001	+1 per each 100,000 inhabitants or fraction +1 if total is an even number

The law did not provide for by-elections to fill vacant seats; instead, any vacancies arising after the proclamation of candidates and during the legislative term were filled by the next candidates on the party lists or, when required, by designated substitutes.

== Parties and candidates ==
The electoral law allowed for parties and federations registered in the interior ministry, alliances and groupings of electors to present lists of candidates. Parties and federations intending to form an alliance were required to inform the relevant electoral commission within 10 days of the election call, whereas groupings of electors needed to secure the signature of a determined amount of the electors registered in the municipality for which they sought election, disallowing electors from signing for more than one list. In the case of Zaragoza, as its population was between 300,001 and 1,000,000, at least 5,000 signatures were required.

Below is a list of the main parties and alliances which contested the election:

Candidacy	Parties and alliances	Leading candidate	Ideology	Previous result		Gov.	Ref.
Candidacy	Parties and alliances	Leading candidate	Ideology	Vote %	Seats	Gov.	Ref.
PSOE	List: Spanish Socialist Workers' Party (PSOE)	Antonio González Triviño	Social democracy	38.7%	13	Yes	
PAR	List: Aragonese Party (PAR)	Ana María Cortés	Regionalism; Centrism	23.1%	8	No	
PP	List: People's Party (PP)	Angel Cristóbal Montes	Conservatism; Christian democracy	15.5%	5	No	
CDS	List: Democratic and Social Centre (CDS)	Rafael de Miguel	Centrism; Liberalism	10.7%	3	No	
CAA–IU	List: Communist Party of Aragon (PCE–A); Socialist Action Party (PASOC); Republican Left (IR)	Ricardo Berdié	Socialism; Communism	7.2%	2	No	

== Results ==
← Summary of the 26 May 1991 City Council of Zaragoza election results →
Parties and alliances	Popular vote			Seats	
Parties and alliances	Votes	%	±pp	Total	+/−
Spanish Socialist Workers' Party (PSOE)	112,106	42.87	+4.19	15	+2
People's Party (PP)^{1}	56,947	21.78	+6.26	7	+2
Aragonese Party (PAR)	47,780	18.27	−4.81	6	−2
Aragon Alternative Convergence–United Left (CAA–IU)	24,594	9.40	+2.21	3	+1
Democratic and Social Centre (CDS)	7,499	2.87	−7.86	0	−3
Aragonese Union (CHA)	6,082	2.33	+1.57	0	±0
Workers' Socialist Party (PST)	1,574	0.60	New	0	±0
Social Aragonese Movement (MAS)	716	0.27	New	0	±0
Left Municipal Platform (PMI)	387	0.15	New	0	±0
Blank ballots	3,815	1.46	−0.04		
Total	261,500			31	±0
Valid votes	261,500	99.32	+0.68		
Invalid votes	1,794	0.68	−0.68		
Votes cast / turnout	263,294	56.48	−10.35		
Abstentions	202,919	43.52	+10.35		
Registered voters	466,213				
Sources
Footnotes: ^{1} People's Party results are compared to the combined totals of People's Alliance and People's Democratic Party in the 1987 election.

Popular vote
PSOE	42.87%
PP	21.78%
PAR	18.27%
CAA–IU	9.40%
CDS	2.87%
CHA	2.33%
Others	1.02%
Blank ballots	1.46%

Seats
PSOE	48.39%
PP	22.58%
PAR	19.35%
CAA–IU	9.68%

== Aftermath ==
=== Government formation ===
Investiture
Ballot →	15 June 1991	
Required majority →	16 out of 31	
Antonio González Triviño (PSOE): • PSOE (15)	15 / 31	check
Ángel Cristóbal Montes (PP): • PP (7)	7 / 31	X mark
Ana María Cortés (PAR): • PAR (6)	6 / 31	X mark
Ricardo Berdié (IU): • IU (3)	3 / 31	X mark
Abstentions/Blank ballots	0 / 31	
Absentees	0 / 31	

== Bibliography ==
- Constitución Española (Constitution). Official State Gazette (in Spanish). 27 December 1978 [version as of 29 December 1978]. BOE-A-1978-31229.
- Ley 7/1985, de 2 de abril, Reguladora de las Bases del Régimen Local (Law 7/1985). Official State Gazette (in Spanish). 2 April 1985 [version as of 27 March 1991]. BOE-A-1985-5392.
- Ley Orgánica 5/1985, de 19 de junio, del Régimen Electoral General (Organic Law 5/1985). Official State Gazette (in Spanish). 19 June 1985 [version as of 14 March 1991]. BOE-A-1985-11672.
- Real Decreto 391/1991, de 1 de abril, de convocatoria de elecciones locales (Royal Decree 391/1991). Official State Gazette (in Spanish). 1 April 1991. BOE-A-1991-7959.
