= David Pla Marín =

Basque activist

- Born: 1975 (age 50–51); Pamplona
- Other name: Mintxo
- Organization: ETA
- Criminal charges: Planning terrorism, membership of a prohibited organisation
- Criminal penalty: 6 years in prison

David Pla Marín (born 1975, Pamplona) is a lawyer and Basque activist, who Spanish authorities believe to have been one of the three leaders of the Basque separatist group ETA at the time of the group's ceasefire declaration in October 2011. In 2000 Pla was condemned to six years imprisonment for planning an attack against the Mayor of Zaragoza, José Atarés. He had previously been the leader of Basque separatist youth organisation Jarrai in the 1990s and had stood unsuccessfully as a candidate for Herri Batasuna in the 1995 local elections.

== Youth organisation ==
In the 1990s, Pla belonged to the Jarrai youth organisation, which was later banned and included in the European Union's list of terrorist organisations on the grounds of its links to ETA. He served as one of the organisation's main spokesmen and organised fund raising events. During this time, he defended "all forms of struggle" as being legitimate for Basque youth and called for independence and self-determination for the Greater Basque Country.

== ETA activities and first conviction ==
In 1994, when Spanish police dismantled the Nafarroa commando unit of ETA, they raided Pla's home in the Ermitagaña district of Pamplona, but failed to find him. In 1998, he was alleged to have made deposits to ETA. In April 1999, his relatives' homes in Madrid were searched as part of an investigation into alleged threats against businessmen. Following this, Pla is believed to have moved to France.

On 28 July 2000, Pla was one of two people arrested in Zaragoza, charged with planning to assassinate the Mayor of the city, José Atarés, by placing a sticky bomb on his car. In June 2001 Pla was found guilty and sentenced to six years in prison and fined 90,000 Pesetas for the use of false documents. The prosecution had sought an eleven-year prison sentence.

In July 2006, Spanish authorities sought to prevent his release, after receiving information from French authorities implicating him in the planning of the assassination of Spanish senator Manuel Giménez Abad, who was killed in May 2001. Pla denied the claims. The substitute judge at the Spanish High Court, Baltasar Garzón, originally ordered Pla to be detained pending further investigations, however, this ruling was overturned in August 2006 and Pla was freed.

== Subsequent activities ==
In 2010, Pla was rearrested, accused of having passed messages from the group's leadership to a group of lawyers representing the organisation At the time of his arrest, the Spanish Interior Ministry also believed Pla to be responsible for managing the relationships between the ETA leadership in France and ETA prisoners, which included assisting with prison escape attempts and aiding fugitives. Pla was released and went into hiding. In June 2011, the Spanish Civil Guard added him to their most wanted list, with Spanish Interior Minister Alfredo Pérez Rubalcaba naming Pla as someone he believed to occupy "a position of high responsibility" within ETA. Pla was believed to have been one of the masked figures reading out ETA's ceasefire declarations in January and October 2011, at which time he was believed to be responsible for ETA's political apparatus.

Subsequently, Pla was involved in the peace process which followed the ceasefire declaration as one of the main negotiators and was given sanctuary in Norway. After eight months there, he was expelled due to lack of progress in the peace process.

On 22 September 2015 Pla was detained by French police in the border town of Saint-Étienne-de-Baïgorry. Security services believed he was attending a meeting of the ETA leadership at the time.

After serving 4 years of a 5-year sentence in Osny prison, much of it in pre-trial detention, Pla was released on 18 April 2019. Part of the conditions of his early release was that he report to the local police station in Hendaye. He was rearrested there on 12 February 2020 under a European Arrest Warrant issued by the Spanish government and extradited to Spain. On 19 February 2020 he was given a conditional release from Soto del Real prison with the charges against him still pending.
