= 1995 Zaragoza municipal election =

Election in the Spanish municipality of Zaragoza

- 28 May 1995

All 31 seats in the City Council of Zaragoza 16 seats needed for a majority
- Registered: 497,001 ▲6.6%
- Turnout: 333,394 (67.1%) ▲10.6 pp

	First party	Second party	Third party
Leader	Luisa Fernanda Rudi	Emilio Comín	Eudaldo Casanova
Party	PP	PSOE	IU
Leader since	10 November 1994	1995	1995
Last election	7 seats, 21.8%	15 seats, 42.9%	3 seats, 9.4%
Seats won	15	6	4
Seat change	▲8	▼9	▲1
Popular vote	155,206	62,390	44,047
Percentage	46.8%	18.8%	13.3%
Swing	▲25.0 pp	▼24.1 pp	▲3.9 pp
	Fourth party	Fifth party
Leader	Francisco Meroño	Antonio Gaspar
Party	PAR	CHA
Leader since	1995	1995
Last election	6 seats, 18.3%	0 seats, 2.3%
Seats won	4	2
Seat change	▼2	▲2
Popular vote	41,558	19,783
Percentage	12.5%	6.0%
Swing	▼5.8 pp	▲3.7 pp
Mayor before election
Antonio González Triviño
PSOE
Mayor after election
Luisa Fernanda Rudi
PP

A municipal election was held in Zaragoza on 28 May 1995 to elect the 5th City Council of the municipality. All 31 seats in the City Council were up for election. It was held concurrently with regional elections in thirteen autonomous communities and local elections all across Spain.

== Overview ==
Under the 1978 Constitution, the governance of municipalities in Spain—part of the country's local government system—was centered on the figure of city councils (Spanish: ayuntamientos), local corporations with independent legal personality composed of a mayor, a government council and an elected legislative assembly. The mayor was indirectly elected by the local assembly, requiring an absolute majority; otherwise, the candidate from the most-voted party automatically became mayor (ties were resolved by drawing lots). In the case of Zaragoza, the top-tier administrative and governing body was the City Council of Zaragoza.

=== Date ===
The term of local assemblies in Spain expired four years after the date of their previous election, with election day being fixed for the fourth Sunday of May every four years. The election decree was required to be issued no later than 54 days before the scheduled election date and published on the following day in the Official State Gazette (BOE). The previous local elections were held on 26 May 1991, setting the date for election day on the fourth Sunday of May four years later, which was 28 May 1995.

Local assemblies could not be dissolved before the expiration of their term, except in cases of mismanagement that seriously harmed the public interest and implied a breach of constitutional obligations, in which case the Council of Ministers could—optionally—decide to call a by-election.

Elections to the assemblies of local entities were officially called on 4 April 1995 with the publication of the corresponding decree in the BOE, setting election day for 28 May.

=== Electoral system ===
Voting for local assemblies was based on universal suffrage, comprising all Spanish nationals over 18 years of age, registered and residing in the municipality and with full political rights (provided that they had not been deprived of the right to vote by a final sentence, nor were legally incapacitated), as well as resident non-nationals whose country of origin allowed reciprocal voting by virtue of a treaty or within the framework of Community Law.

Local councillors were elected using the D'Hondt method and closed-list proportional voting, with a five percent-threshold of valid votes (including blank ballots) in each municipality. Each municipality was a multi-member constituency, with a number of seats based on the following scale:

Population	Councillors
<250	5
251–1,000	7
1,001–2,000	9
2,001–5,000	11
5,001–10,000	13
10,001–20,000	17
20,001–50,000	21
50,001–100,000	25
>100,001	+1 per each 100,000 inhabitants or fraction +1 if total is an even number

The law did not provide for by-elections to fill vacant seats; instead, any vacancies arising after the proclamation of candidates and during the legislative term were filled by the next candidates on the party lists or, when required, by designated substitutes.

== Parties and candidates ==
The electoral law allowed for parties and federations registered in the interior ministry, alliances and groupings of electors to present lists of candidates. Parties and federations intending to form an alliance were required to inform the relevant electoral commission within 10 days of the election call, whereas groupings of electors needed to secure the signature of a determined amount of the electors registered in the municipality for which they sought election, disallowing electors from signing for more than one list. In the case of Zaragoza, as its population was between 300,001 and 1,000,000, at least 5,000 signatures were required.

Below is a list of the main parties and alliances which contested the election:

Candidacy	Parties and alliances	Leading candidate	Ideology	Previous result		Gov.	Ref.
Candidacy	Parties and alliances	Leading candidate	Ideology	Vote %	Seats	Gov.	Ref.
PSOE	List: Spanish Socialist Workers' Party (PSOE)	Emilio Comín	Social democracy	42.9%	15	Yes	
PP	List: People's Party (PP)	Luisa Fernanda Rudi	Conservatism; Christian democracy	21.8%	7	No	
PAR	List: Aragonese Party (PAR)	Francisco Meroño	Regionalism; Centrism	18.3%	6	No	
IU	List: United Left of Aragon (IU) – Communist Party of Aragon (PCE–A) – Socialist Action Party (PASOC) – Republican Left (IR)	Eudaldo Casanova	Socialism; Communism	9.4%	3	No	
CHA	List: Aragonese Union (CHA)	Antonio Gaspar	Aragonese nationalism Eco-socialism	2.3%	0	No	

== Results ==
← Summary of the 28 May 1995 City Council of Zaragoza election results →
Parties and alliances	Popular vote			Seats	
Parties and alliances	Votes	%	±pp	Total	+/−
People's Party (PP)	155,206	46.78	+25.00	15	+8
Spanish Socialist Workers' Party (PSOE)	62,390	18.81	−24.06	6	−9
United Left of Aragon (IU)	44,047	13.28	+3.88	4	+1
Aragonese Party (PAR)	41,558	12.53	−5.74	4	−2
Aragonese Union (CHA)	19,783	5.96	+3.63	2	+2
Independent Federation of Workers and Self-employed (FITA)	1,237	0.37	New	0	±0
Platform of Independents of Spain (PIE)	963	0.29	New	0	±0
Aragonese Unity (UA)	654	0.20	New	0	±0
Spanish Phalanx of the CNSO (FE–JONS)	275	0.08	New	0	±0
Blank ballots	5,655	1.70	+0.24		
Total	331,768			31	±0
Valid votes	331,768	99.51	+0.19		
Invalid votes	1,626	0.49	−0.19		
Votes cast / turnout	333,394	67.08	+10.60		
Abstentions	163,607	32.92	−10.60		
Registered voters	497,001				

Popular vote
PP	46.78%
PSOE	18.81%
IU	13.28%
PAR	12.53%
CHA	5.96%
Others	0.94%
Blank ballots	1.70%

Seats
PP	48.39%
PSOE	19.35%
IU	12.90%
PAR	12.90%
CHA	6.45%

== Aftermath ==
=== Government formation ===
Investiture
Ballot →	17 June 1995	
Required majority →	16 out of 31	
Luisa Fernanda Rudi (PP): • PP (15); • PAR (4)	19 / 31	check
Emilio Comín (PSOE): • PSOE (6)	6 / 31	X mark
Eudaldo Casanova (IU): • IU (4)	4 / 31	X mark
Antonio Gaspar (CHA): • CHA (2)	2 / 31	X mark
Abstentions/Blank ballots	0 / 31	
Absentees	0 / 31	

== Bibliography ==
- Constitución Española (Constitution). Official State Gazette (in Spanish). 27 December 1978 [version as of 28 August 1992]. BOE-A-1978-31229.
- Ley 7/1985, de 2 de abril, Reguladora de las Bases del Régimen Local (Law 7/1985). Official State Gazette (in Spanish). 2 April 1985 [version as of 31 December 1994]. BOE-A-1985-5392.
- Ley Orgánica 5/1985, de 19 de junio, del Régimen Electoral General (Organic Law 5/1985). Official State Gazette (in Spanish). 19 June 1985 [version as of 24 March 1995]. BOE-A-1985-11672.
- Real Decreto 489/1995, de 3 de abril, de convocatoria de elecciones locales y a las Asambleas de Ceuta y Melilla (Royal Decree 489/1995). Official State Gazette (in Spanish). 3 April 1995. BOE-A-1995-8132.
