= Eloy Suárez =

Spanish politician

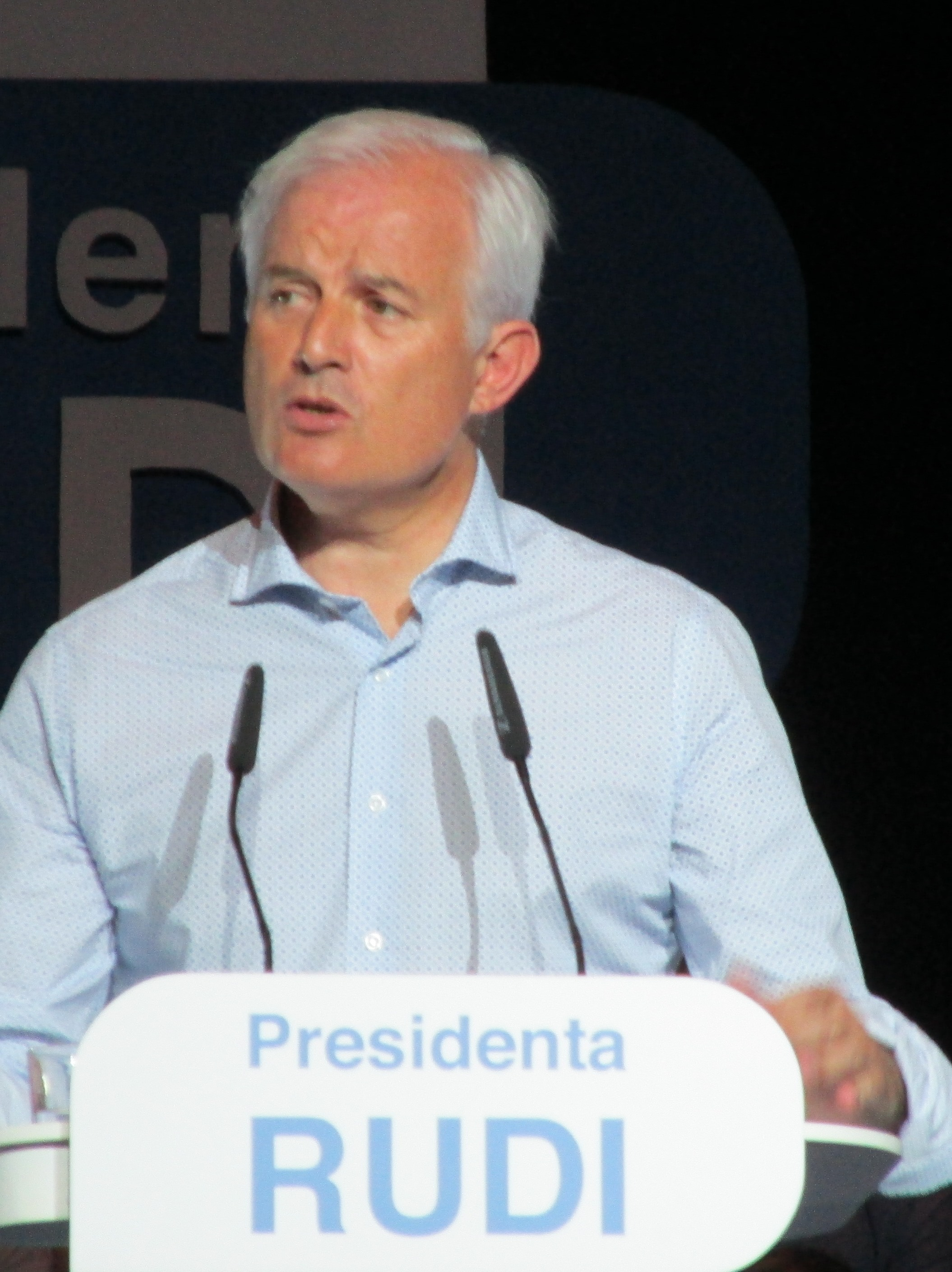

Spokesperson of the People's Municipal Group; in the Zaragoza City Council
- In office June 11, 2011 – February 1, 2016
- Preceded by: Dolores Serrat
- Succeeded by: Jorge Azcón

Spokesperson of the People's Parliamentary Group in the Cortes of Aragon
- In office June 2007 – June 11, 2011
- Preceded by: Antonio Suárez Oriz
- Succeeded by: Antonio Torres Millera

Deputy in the General Courts
- In office December 13, 2011 – August 17, 2023
- Constituency: Zaragoza

Deputy in the Cortes of Aragon
- In office May 25, 2003 – June 11, 2011
- Constituency: Zaragoza

Councillor of the Zaragoza City Council
- In office June 11, 2011 – February 1, 2016

Personal details
- Born: February 8, 1962 (age 64) Tudela, Navarre
- Party: People's Party of Aragon
- Profession: Lawyer

Eloy Vicente Suárez Lamata (born February 8, 1962) is a Spanish politician who currently serves as a deputy in the Congress of Deputies for Zaragoza and president of the Finance Committee. He was the spokesperson for the People's Party (PP) in the Zaragoza City Council from 2011 to 2016.

== Early life and aducation ==
He is the son of the veterinarian of Alcubierre, where he lived until the age of eight. He was born in Tudela.He graduated in Law from the University of Zaragoza and holds specialization diplomas in accounting and auditing of public administrations, in agricultural law, and a specialization course in Leadership and Public Management from the IESE.

== Career ==
In December 2010, he was chosen as the PP candidate for the mayoralty of the Zaragoza City Council. In the 2011 municipal elections on May 22, 2011, for the capital of Aragon, the People's Party won with 131,350 votes (41.26%) and obtained 15 councilors. Despite this victory, the PSOE, CHA, and IU formed a coalition with their 16 councilors, achieving an absolute majority, which allowed Juan Alberto Belloch to remain the mayor.

On February 14, 2015, the national electoral committee of the PP ratified Suárez as the party's candidate for the mayoralty. On May 24 of that same year, the municipal elections were held in the capital of Aragon, where the People's Party once again became the most voted party with 87,554 votes (26.88%), obtaining ten councilors, five less than in the previous elections of 2011. The People's Party was only the most voted party in two of its strongholds; Centro and Universidad (despite this, it had a drop of 15 and 17 percentage points respectively compared to the previous municipal elections), as well as in the districts of Delicias, San José, and the rural neighborhoods.

In the general elections on December 20, 2015, Eloy Suárez was elected deputy for the Zaragoza constituency (where he was the leading candidate) for the XI legislature.

On February 1, 2016, Eloy Suárez announced his resignation as spokesperson of the People's Party and his seat as a councilor in the Zaragoza City Council. He was succeeded by Jorge Azcón as the party's spokesperson in the Zaragoza City Council.

Suárez was appointed spokesperson of the People's Party in the Rules Committee of the Congress, and a few days later he was also appointed spokesperson of the Finance Committee.

On June 26, 2016, Eloy Suárez repeated as a candidate for the XII legislature in the 2016 general elections, where the People's Party was the most voted party with 246,129 votes (35.13%) and obtained six deputies.
