= Rocío Dívar =

Spanish politician (born 1981)

Member of the Senate
- Incumbent
- Assumed office 23 July 2023
- Constituency: Zaragoza

Personal details
- Born: 12 June 1981 (age 44)
- Party: People's Party

María del Rocío Dívar Conde (born 12 June 1981) is a Spanish politician serving as a member of the Senate since 2023. She has served as deputy spokesperson of the People's Party group in the Senate since 2023.
