= El Vallecillo =

- municipality
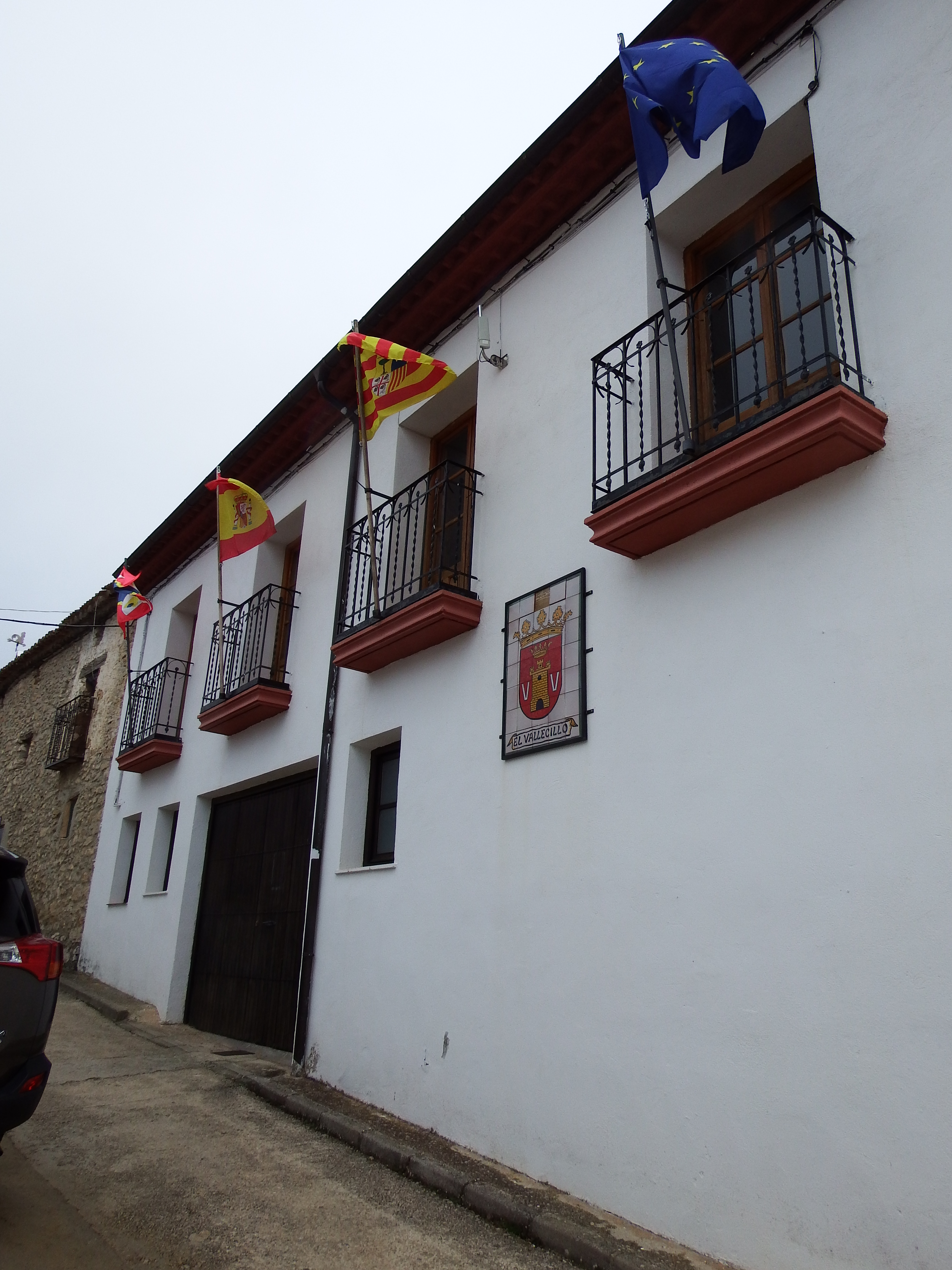
- Town hall

- Flag Coat of arms

- Location within Spain
- Coordinates: 40°14′N 1°34′W
- Country: Spain
- Autonomous community: Aragon
- Province: Teruel

Area
  - Total: 21.59 km^{2} (8.34 sq mi)

Population (2025-01-01)
  - Total: 40
  - Density: 1.9/km^{2} (4.8/sq mi)
- Time zone: UTC+1 (CET)
  - Summer (DST): UTC+2 (CEST)

El Vallecillo is a municipality located in the province of Teruel, Aragon, Spain. According to the 2004 census (INE), the municipality has a population of 60 inhabitants.

== Notable inhabitants ==
- José Atarés (1960–2013), mayor of Zaragoza, senator for the province of Zaragoza

== See also ==
- List of municipalities in Teruel
