= Margarita Mariscal de Gante =

Spanish judge and politician (born 1954)

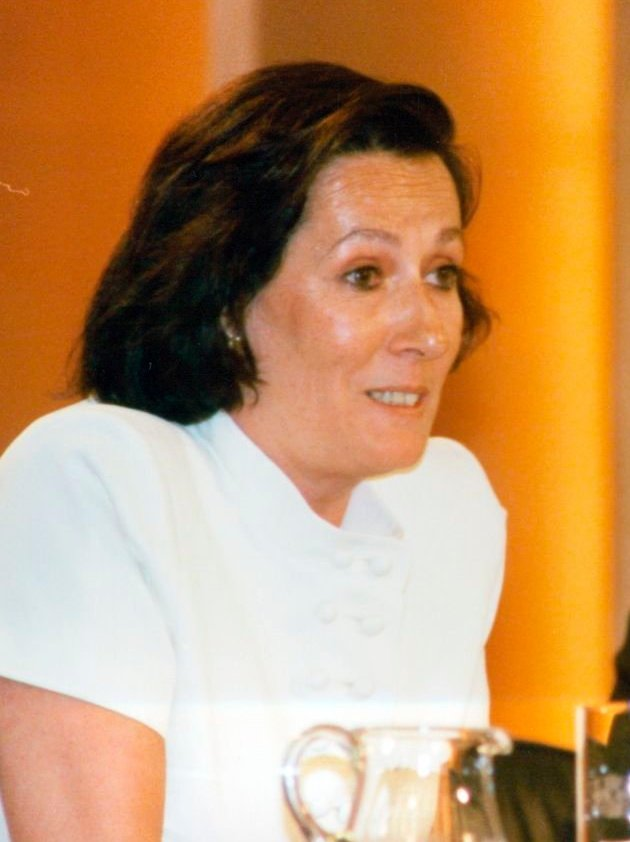
- Mariscal de Gante in 1996

First Vice President of the Chamber of Deputies
- In office 9 April 2002 – 20 January 2004
- Preceded by: Francisco Camps
- Succeeded by: Carme Chacón

Member of the Congress of Deputies
- In office 12 March 2000 – 2 April 2004
- Constituency: Albacete

Minister of Justice
- In office 6 May 1996 – 28 April 2000
- Prime Minister: Jose Maria Aznar
- Preceded by: Juan Alberto Belloch
- Succeeded by: Ángel Acebes

Personal details
- Born: 10 January 1954 (age 72) Madrid
- Party: Independent

Margarita Mariscal de Gante y Mirón (born 10 January 1954) is a Spanish judge and politician, who served as the minister of justice from 1996 to 2000.

== Early life ==
Mariscal de Gante was born in Madrid on 10 January 1954. She is the daughter of Jaime Mariscal de Gante, a judge of the Public Order Tribunal created in Francoist Spain. The brother of this judge, Commissioner Mariscal de Gante, is also known for having invited the torturer Billy el Niño, the alias of Antonio González Pacheco, to celebrate in a police station in Madrid. She has a law degree.

== Career ==
Mariscal de Gante worked as a judge in different cities of Spain before she attained her ministerial appointment. She was appointed minister of justice on 6 May 1996, replacing Juan Alberto Belloch in the post. She was in office until 28 April 2000 and Ángel Acebes replaced her as justice minister. She was elected to the congress of deputies in 2000, representing Albacete Province, and served there until 2004. During her term she was the first vice-president of the congress.
