= José Atarés =

Spanish politician (1960–2013)

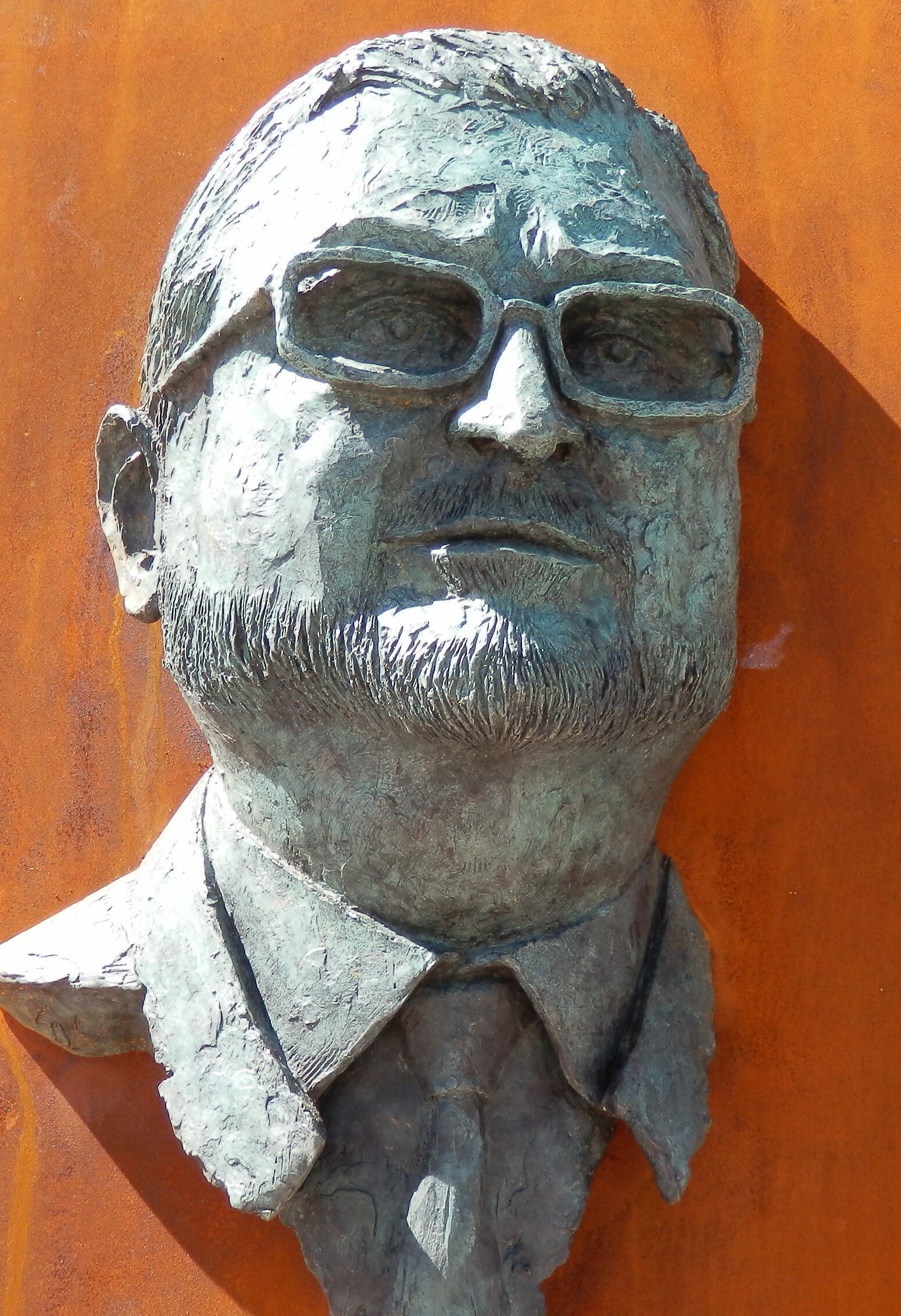
Sculpture of Atarés on the street named after him in Zaragoza

José Atarés Martínez (2 August 1960 – 26 September 2013) was a Spanish People's Party (PP) politician. He was a city councillor (1991–2007) and the mayor of Zaragoza (2000–2003). He was also a senator for the Zaragoza constituency from 2004 until his death.

== Biography ==
Born in El Vallecillo, Province of Teruel, Aragon, Atarés was the son of a farm manager. His father wanted him to continue the family trade, but instead he became an estate agent, then graduated in Law from the University of Zaragoza. He then opened a law firm.

Briefly in the Socialist Party of Aragon, Atarés joined the PP in the mid-1980s. He was first elected to the city hall in 1991, first in opposition to the Spanish Socialist Workers' Party (PSOE). In 1995, his party entered government. Luisa Fernanda Rudi became mayor and he was first deputy and spokesman. When she left office in April 2000 to become President of the Congress of Deputies, he became the mayor.

Two months after Atarés's inauguration, two members of ETA were detained for plotting his assassination. David Pla Marín and Aitor Lorente were jailed for the plot. In the city hall, his party had to form a coalition with the Aragonese Party (PAR), and lost popularity due to a lack of opposition to some of the PP national government's proposals, such as the National Hydrological Plan and the Iraq War. This led to his defeat as mayor in 2003, though he remained on the city council until 2007.

In 2004, Atarés unsuccessfully ran for the leadership of Aragon's PP against Gustavo Alcalde. He also served as a senator from 2004 until his death. As mayor, he campaigned for Zaragoza to hold Expo 2008. The exposition was won by the city and held during the mandate of his successor Juan Alberto Belloch, who recognised his role in earning it for the city. Belloch also awarded Atarés, as well as all other democratic mayors of the city whether living or dead, with Zargoza's Gold Medal in 2008.

Atarés died of colorectal cancer on 26 September 2013, at the age of 53. Zaragoza paid tribute to him with a monument in his honour, near to the Expo 2008 site.The Avenida de las Ranillas was renamed after him, causing some controversy as locals were not consulted of the change. The street was originally named after frogs, who inspired sculptures and mascots at the Expo.
