= Antonio González Triviño =

Spanish politician

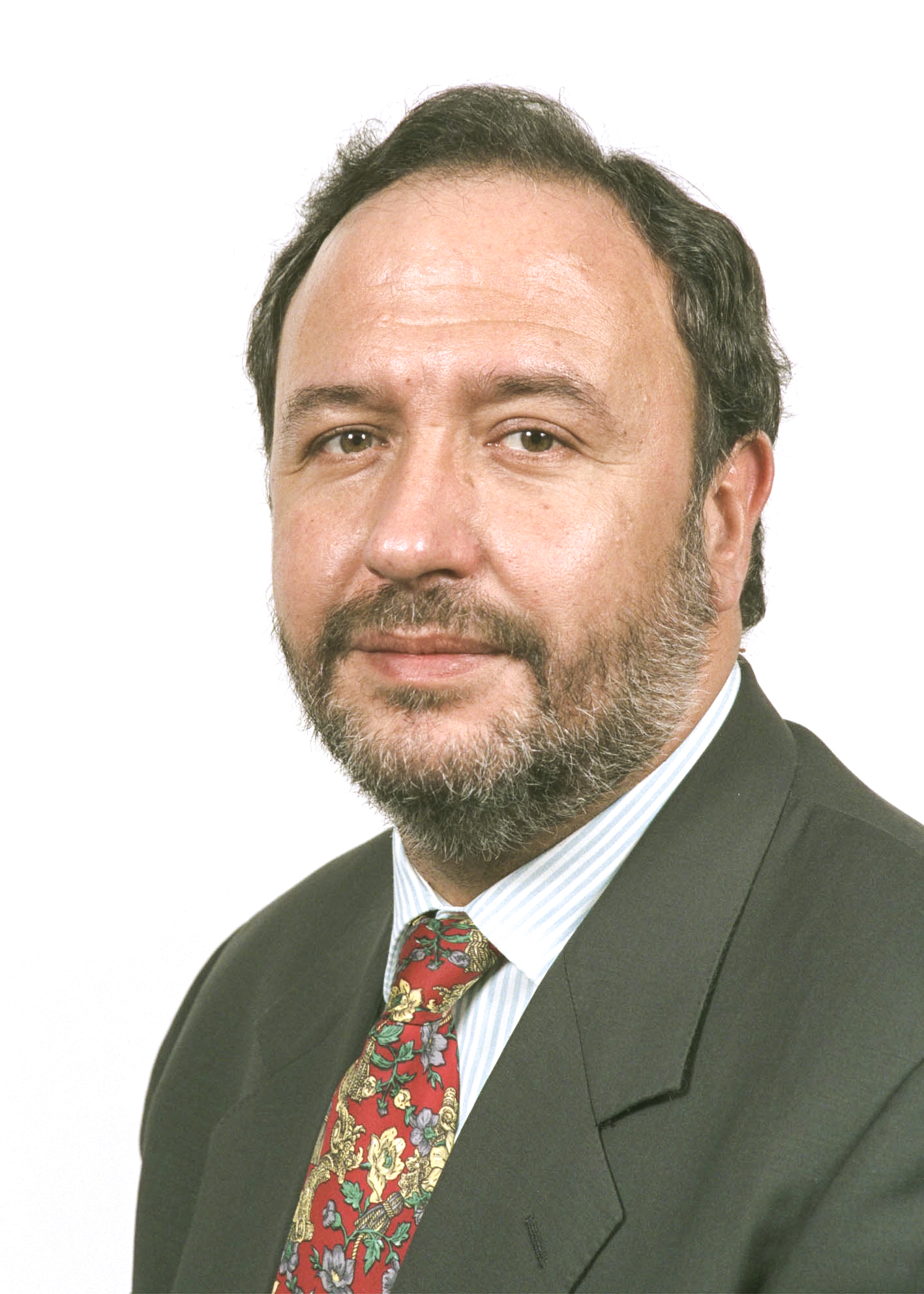
- González Triviño in 1994

Member of the European Parliament
- In office 19 July 1994 – 20 July 1999
- Constituency: Spain

Personal details
- Born: 5 March 1951 (age 75) Tétouan, Spanish Morocco
- Party: UCD; PSOE
- Other political affiliations: PES; ERA

Antonio González Triviño (born 5 March 1951) is a Spanish businessman and former politician. As a member of the Union of the Democratic Centre and later the Spanish Socialist Workers' Party (PSOE), he was a city councillor in Zaragoza from 1979 to 1995, serving as mayor since 1986. He was a Member of the European Parliament from 1994 to 1999.

== Biography ==
Born in Tétouan, in what was then the Spanish protectorate in Morocco, González Triviño became mayor of Zaragoza in January 1986 after the death of Ramón Sainz de Varanda. He oversaw the building of the Pabellón Príncipe Felipe sporting arena and the Auditorio, as well as remodelling of the plazas outside the Cathedral-Basilica of Our Lady of the Pillar and the Cathedral of the Savior of Zaragoza.

The construction of the Auditorio and the water purification plant at La Cartuja were said by González Triviño to be funded by the national government, which was not the case. The latter had cost residents over €250 million by its 20th anniversary in 2013. After being defeated by Luisa Fernanda Rudi of the People's Party (PP) in the 1995 election, he concentrated on his seat in the European Parliament, won the previous year. In 1996, he was expelled from the Group of the Party of European Socialists in the European Parliament. He served the rest of his term until 1999 as a member of the European Radical Alliance.

In 2008, incumbent mayor Juan Alberto Belloch gave Zaragoza's gold medal to all of his living predecessors, including González Triviño.
