= Zaragoza (Senate constituency) =

Senate constituency of Spain

Coordinates: 41°35′N 1°00′W

- Senate of Spain; Electoral constituency
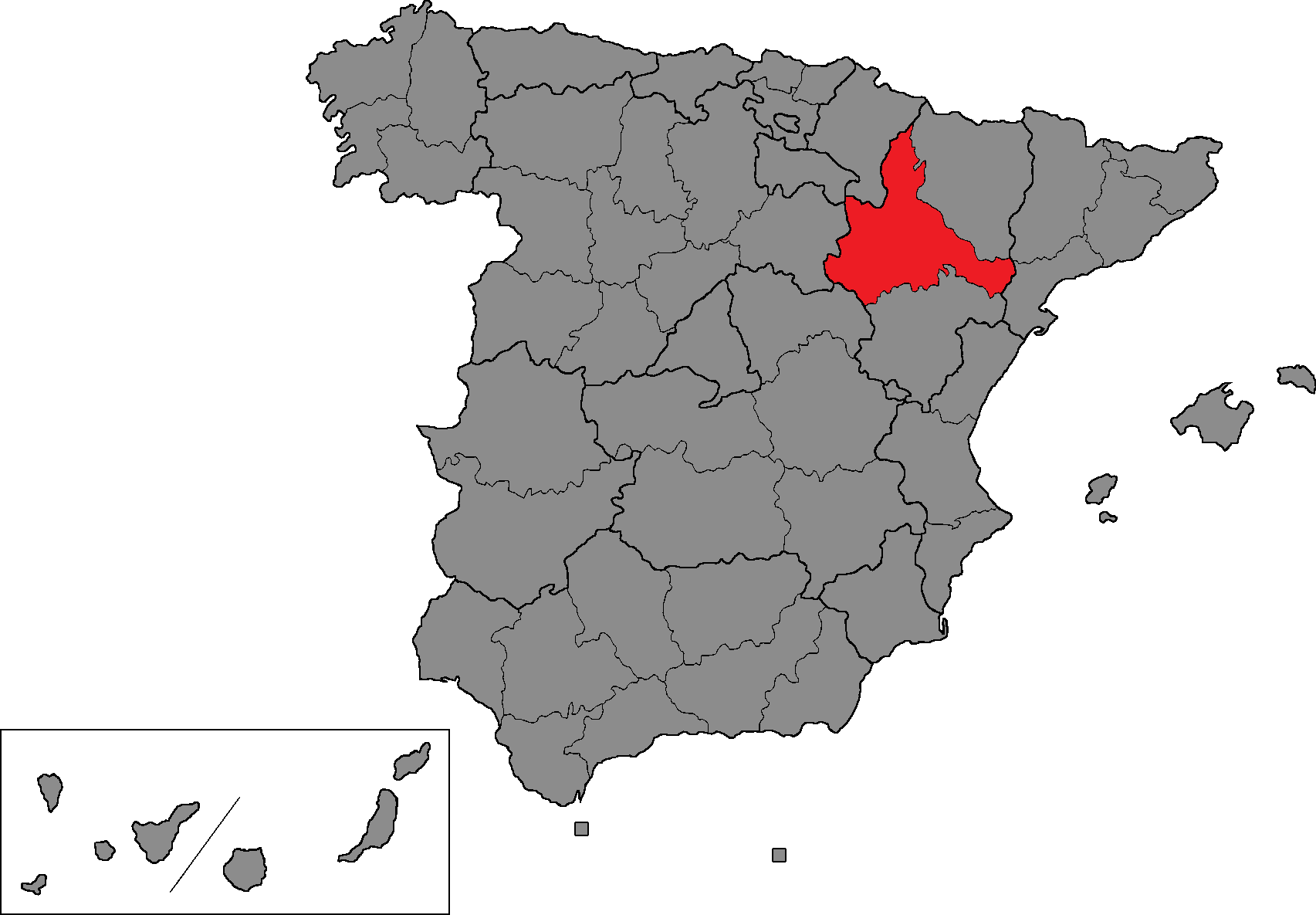
- Location of Zaragoza within Spain
- Province: Zaragoza
- Autonomous community: Aragon
- Population: ▲983,539 (2024)
- Electorate: ▲740,060 (2023)
- Major settlements: Zaragoza

Current constituency
- Created: 1977
- Seats: 4
- Members: PP (3); PSOE (1)

Zaragoza is one of the 60 constituencies represented in the Senate of Spain, the upper chamber of the Spanish parliament, the Cortes Generales. The constituency (whose boundaries correspond to those of the homonymous province) elects four senators. The electoral system uses open-list (Note: Parties can group candidates into lists, although each candidate is treated separately for the purpose of the voting procedure.) partial block voting, with electors voting for individual candidates instead of parties. Electors can vote for up to three candidates.

== Electoral system ==
The constituency was created as per the Political Reform Law and was first contested in the 1977 general election. The Law provided for the provinces of Spain to be established as multi-member districts in the Senate, with this regulation being maintained under the Spanish Constitution of 1978. Additionally, the Constitution requires for any modification of the provincial limits to be approved under an organic law, needing an absolute majority in the Cortes Generales.

Voting is based on universal suffrage, comprising all Spanish nationals over 18 years of age with full political rights, provided that they have not been deprived of the right to vote by a final sentence. The only exception was in 1977, when this was limited to nationals over 21 years of age and in full enjoyment of their political and civil rights. Amendments in 2011 required non-resident citizens to apply for voting, a system known as "begged" voting (Spanish: Voto rogado). which was abolished in 2022. Further, amendments in 2018 granted the right to vote to those legally incapacitated. 209 Senate seats (207 in 1977, 208 from 1978 to 2026) are elected using open-list partial block voting: voters in constituencies electing four seats can choose up to three candidates; in those with two or three seats, up to two; and in single-member districts, one. Each of the 47 peninsular provinces is allocated four seats, while in insular provinces—such as the Balearic and Canary Islands—the districts are the islands themselves, with the larger ones (Mallorca, Gran Canaria and Tenerife) being allocated three seats each, and the smaller ones (Menorca, Ibiza, Formentera, Fuerteventura, La Gomera, El Hierro, Lanzarote and La Palma) one each. (Note: La Gomera and El Hierro comprised a single constituency for the 1977 election. A constitutional reform in 2026 awarded Formentera an independent senator separate from Ibiza.) Ceuta and Melilla elect two seats each. Until 1985, the law also provided for by-elections to fill Senate seats vacated up to two years into the legislature; subsequently, any vacancies arising after the proclamation of candidates and during the legislative term are filled by the next candidates on the party lists or, when required, by designated substitutes.

The electoral law allows for parties and federations registered in the interior ministry, alliances and groupings of electors to present lists of candidates. Parties and federations intending to form an alliance are required to inform the relevant electoral commission within 10 days of the election call—15 before 1985—whereas groupings of electors need to secure the signature of at least one percent of the electorate in the constituencies for which they seek election—one permille of the electorate, with a compulsory minimum of 500 signatures, until 1985—disallowing electors from signing for more than one list. Also since 2011, parties, federations or alliances that have not obtained a mandate in either chamber of the Cortes at the preceding election are required to secure the signature of at least 0.1 percent of electors in the aforementioned constituencies. Amendments in 2007 required a balanced composition of men and women in the electoral lists, so that candidates of either sex made up at least 40 percent of the total composition; further amendments in 2024 required the use of a zipper system.

== Senators ==
Senators for Zaragoza 1977–
Key to parties CAUD PSOE CAIC Cs UCD PP CP AP
Legislature	Election	Distribution
Constituent	1977	3 / 1
1st	1979	1 / 3
2nd	1982	3 / 1
3rd	1986	3 / 1
4th	1989	3 / 1
5th	1993	3 / 1
6th	1996	1 / 3
7th	2000	1 / 3
8th	2004	3 / 1
9th	2008	3 / 1
10th	2011	1 / 3
11th	2015	1 / 3
12th	2016	1 / 3
13th	2019 (Apr)	3 / 1
14th	2019 (Nov)	3 / 1
15th	2023	1 / 3

== General elections ==
=== 2023 ===
Summary of the 23 July 2023 Senate of Spain election results
Candidates	Parties and coalitions	Popular vote	
Candidates	Parties and coalitions	Votes	%
Luisa Fernanda Rudi Úbeda	PP	187,631	37.13
María del Rocío Dívar Conde	PP	180,882	35.80
José Manuel Aranda Lassa	PP	177,734	35.17
Miguel Carmelo Dalmau Blanco	PSOE	163,158	32.29
• María José Navarro Lafita	PSOE	158,581	31.38
• Álvaro Blasco Martín	PSOE	146,270	28.95
• María Pilar Real Díaz	Vox	67,779	13.41
• Jesús Gómez Ulecia	Vox	62,569	12.38
• Luis Javier Lorén Torres	Vox	59,158	11.70
• José Manuel Cazorla Pérez	Existe	12,912	2.55
• Mireya Zueco Izquierdo	Existe	9,981	1.97
• Rafael Abadía Garralda	Existe	7,873	1.55
• María del Mar Buisán Letosa	PACMA	5,749	1.13
• Clemente Sánchez Garnica Gómez	PAR	5,628	1.11
• María Lina Hernando Peinado	PAR	3,836	0.75
• Jesús Martín Pérez	PAR	2,714	0.53
• Miguel Tello Bernad	PCTE	1,574	0.31
• Guillermo González Balmaseda	PUM+J	1,160	0.22
• José María Palleja Piñol	Recortes Cero	1,124	0.22
Blank ballots		9,551	1.89
Total		1,452,341	
Valid votes		505,232	98.57
Invalid votes		7,279	1.42
Votes cast / turnout		512,511	72.58
Abstentions		193,584	27.41
Registered voters		706,095	

=== November 2019 ===
Summary of the 10 November 2019 Senate of Spain election results in Zaragoza
Candidates	Parties and coalitions	Popular vote	
Candidates	Parties and coalitions	Votes	%
José Manuel Aranda Lassa	PP	162,580	32.08
Miguel Carmelo Dalmau Blanco	PSOE	160,893	31.75
Ana Isabel Villar Lechón	PSOE	157,873	31.15
Víctor Javier Ruiz de Diego	PSOE	151,378	29.87
• Ricardo Canals Lizano	PP	150,344	29.66
• María Tatiana Gaudes Lalmolda	PP	127,018	25.06
• Pascual López Buesa	Vox	82,724	16.32
• María Yolanda Sancho Serrano	Podemos–IU	56,525	11.15
• Ana Pilar Velilla Martínez	Cs	56,146	11.08
• Elena García Juango	Podemos–IU	50,771	10.02
• Leandro Eduardo Piragini Giella	Podemos–IU	46,113	9.10
• Miguel Ángel Polo Gil	Cs	44,395	8.76
• Ángel Sánchez Calvo	Cs	39,583	7.81
• Antonio Angulo Borque	Más País–CHA–Equo	19,826	3.91
• María Victoria Calzada Torres	Más País–CHA–Equo	17,210	3.40
• Basilia Torres Cuadrado	Más País–CHA–Equo	14,496	2.86
• Marina Luna Gálvez	PACMA	7,556	1.49
• José Manuel Sanjuán Aragonés	PACMA	4,474	0.88
• Tamara Satorre Constant	PACMA	4,115	0.81
• Antonio José Mateo Aguarón	EB	3,913	0.77
• María Teresa Lou Arnal	EB	3,527	0.70
• Santiago Pintos Pamplona	EB	2,934	0.58
• Blas Guevara Prieto	Recortes Cero–GV	1,813	0.36
• Fernando Díaz Sanz	MAS	1,514	0.30
• Alejandro David Muñoz Basols	TA	1,509	0.30
• Amparo de Frutos Sanz	PUM+J	1,436	0.28
• Zoe Gonzaléz Garcia	Recortes Cero–GV	1,306	0.26
• Jesús Lipe Figueruelo	FIA	956	0.19
• Alberto Sopeña Borroy	PCTE	929	0.18
• Pilar Yolanda Esteban Martínez	PYLN	915	0.18
• Andrés Ibiricu López	Recortes Cero–GV	843	0.17
• Miguel Angel Galindo Vicente	PCPE	703	0.14
• Josepa Andujar Morales	FIA	610	0.12
• Fernando Benjamín Ruiz Sebastián	FIA	498	0.10
Blank ballots		11,700	2.31
Total		506,811	
Valid votes		506,811	98.29
Invalid votes		8,794	1.71
Votes cast / turnout		515,605	69.72
Abstentions		223,968	30.28
Registered voters		739,573	

== Bibliography ==
- Ley 1/1977, de 4 de enero, para la Reforma Política (Fundamental Law 1/1977). Official State Gazette (in Spanish). 4 January 1977. BOE-A-1977-165.
- Real Decreto-ley 20/1977, de 18 de marzo, sobre Normas Electorales (Royal Decree-Law 20/1977). Official State Gazette (in Spanish). 18 March 1977. BOE-A-1977-7445.
- Constitución Española (Constitution). Official State Gazette (in Spanish). 27 December 1978. BOE-A-1978-31229.
- Ley Orgánica 5/1985, de 19 de junio, del Régimen Electoral General (Organic Law 5/1985). Official State Gazette (in Spanish). 19 June 1985. BOE-A-1985-11672.
- Carreras de Odriozola, Albert; Tafunell Sambola, Xavier (2005) [1989]. Estadísticas históricas de España, siglos XIX-XX (PDF) (in Spanish). Vol. 1 (II ed.). Bilbao: Fundación BBVA. pp. 1072–1097. ISBN 84-96515-00-1. Archived from the original (PDF) on 24 September 2015.
