= Manuel Giménez Abad =

Spanish politician (1948 - 2001)

Manuel Giménez Abad (Pamplona, 4 December 1948 - Zaragoza, 6 May 2001) was a Spanish politician who formed part of the Spanish People's party and President of the same party in Aragon, assassinated by the terrorist group ETA in 2001.

== Biography ==
Manuel was born in Pamplona on 4 December 1948. He studied law in the University of Navarra, once he completed the studies, he imparted the teaching. As well as in the Aragonese Institute of Public Administration and the University of Granada. He became part of the Superior Body of Civil Administrators of the Spanish State. There held relevant positions, as General Secretary of the Institute of Administrative Studies, Chief of the Section of Selection and Improvement Qualification and Technical Advisor.

He was always linked to administration. He joined the Provincial Government of Aragon, wherein 1995 he became the Director of the Presidency and Institutional Relations of the Government of Aragon. In 1999 he was elected Deputy to the Cortes of Aragon for the People's party and later Senator by the Autonomous Community of Aragon.

On 24 February 2001 Manuel was appointed President of the People's Party in Aragon, substituting Santiago Lanzuela. He assumed the party leadership at a critical moment due to the pressure Aragonese social plan against the National Hydrological Plan and the transfer of the Ebro.

== Death ==
On 6 May 2001, he was going with one of his sons to the stadium of La Romareda of Zaragoza to see a Real Zaragoza football match when a member of the terrorist group ETA shot him three shots in the back, two of them in the head. Health Services went immediately to the place, but they could not reanimate him.

The next day, a massive demonstration was held in the Aragonese capital, in which more than 350,000 people participated, summoned by all political forces, in repudiation for the crime. His funeral and burial were held in the town of Jaca (Huesca), where he had spent much of his youth. The president of the Government, José Maria Aznar, attended the funeral.

== Bibliography ==
- MERINO, A., CHAPA, A., Raíces de Libertad. pp. 223–233. FPEV (2011). ISBN 978-84-615-0648-4 (in spanish)
- This article makes use of material translated from the corresponding article in the Spanish-language Wikipedia.
