= Juan Alberto Belloch =

Spanish judge and socialist politician (born 1950)

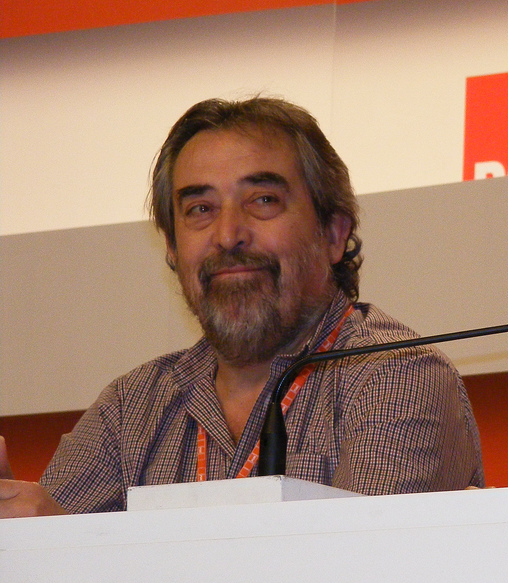
- Belloch in 2011

Mayor of Zaragoza
- In office 14 June 2003 – 13 June 2015
- Preceded by: José Atarés
- Succeeded by: Pedro Santisteve

Minister of Interior
- In office 5 May 1994 – 6 May 1996
- Prime Minister: Felipe González; Jose Maria Aznar
- Preceded by: Antoni Asunción Hernández
- Succeeded by: Jaime Mayor Oreja

Minister of Justice
- In office 14 July 1993 – 6 May 1996
- Prime Minister: Felipe González
- Preceded by: Tomás Fernández del Castillo
- Succeeded by: Margarita Mariscal de Gante

Personal details
- Born: Juan Alberto Belloch Julbe; 1950 (age 75–76) Mora de Rubielos, Teruel Province
- Party: Socialist Party
- Spouse: Mari Cruz Soriano
- Education: University of Barcelona

Juan Alberto Belloch (born 1950) is a Spanish judge and socialist politician, who served in different cabinet posts. He served as the mayor of Zaragoza between June 2003 and 13 June 2015.

== Early life and education ==
Belloch was born in Mora de Rubielos, Teruel Province, in 1950. He graduated from the University of Barcelona with a law degree.

== Career and activities ==
Belloch worked as a judge in the Basque county. He is the founder of the Judges for Democracy and was an active member of the organization until 1990. He also established the association for human rights in 1984. He served as the president of the provincial court of Vizcaya. In 1990, he was appointed a member of the general council of the judiciary.

Belloch is a member of Spain's Socialist Party. On 14 July 1993 he was appointed justice minister in a cabinet reshuffle and became part of the cabinet led by the prime minister Felipe Gonzalez. However, he was an independent member of the cabinet. He served in the post until 6 May 1996.

He was also appointed interior minister on 5 May 1994, replacing Antoni Asunción Hernández in the post, who resigned from office in late April 1994. Therefore, both justice ministry and interior ministry were headed by Belloch. His attempts to clean the ministry of interior led to the discovery of the GAL affair which triggered the trial and arrest of the former interior minister José Barrionuevo. The affair then was searched by an inquiry committee in the Spanish senate and following the inquiry it was dissolved. Belloch was in office until 6 May 1996 and was succeeded by Jaime Mayor Oreja in the post. He became a member of the Spanish parliament in 1996, representing Zaragoza province. and served there until 2000. Next he became a senator for Zaragoza and held the post from 2000 to 2004.

After leaving office, he became a Zaragoza councilman. He ran for the mayor of Zaragoza and was elected to the post in June 2003. He was reelected for office in 2007 and in 2011. In 2008, he was appointed the chairman of the association of cities and regions hosting an international exposition (AVE). He attempted to make Zaragoza the European Capital of Culture for 2016. His other significant activity as mayor was to make the city the host of the Winter Olympics in 2022. In the municipal elections in May 2015 he lost and Pedro Santisteve was elected as the mayor of Zaragoza.

Political offices
Preceded by Tomás de la Quadra-Salcedo	Minister of Justice; 1993–1996	Succeeded by Margarita Mariscal de Gante
Preceded by Antoni Asunción	Minister of the Interior; 1994–1996	Succeeded by Jaime Mayor Oreja
Preceded by José Atarés	Mayor of Zaragoza; 2003–2015	Succeeded by Pedro Santisteve
