= José Ángel Biel =

Spanish politician (born 1946)

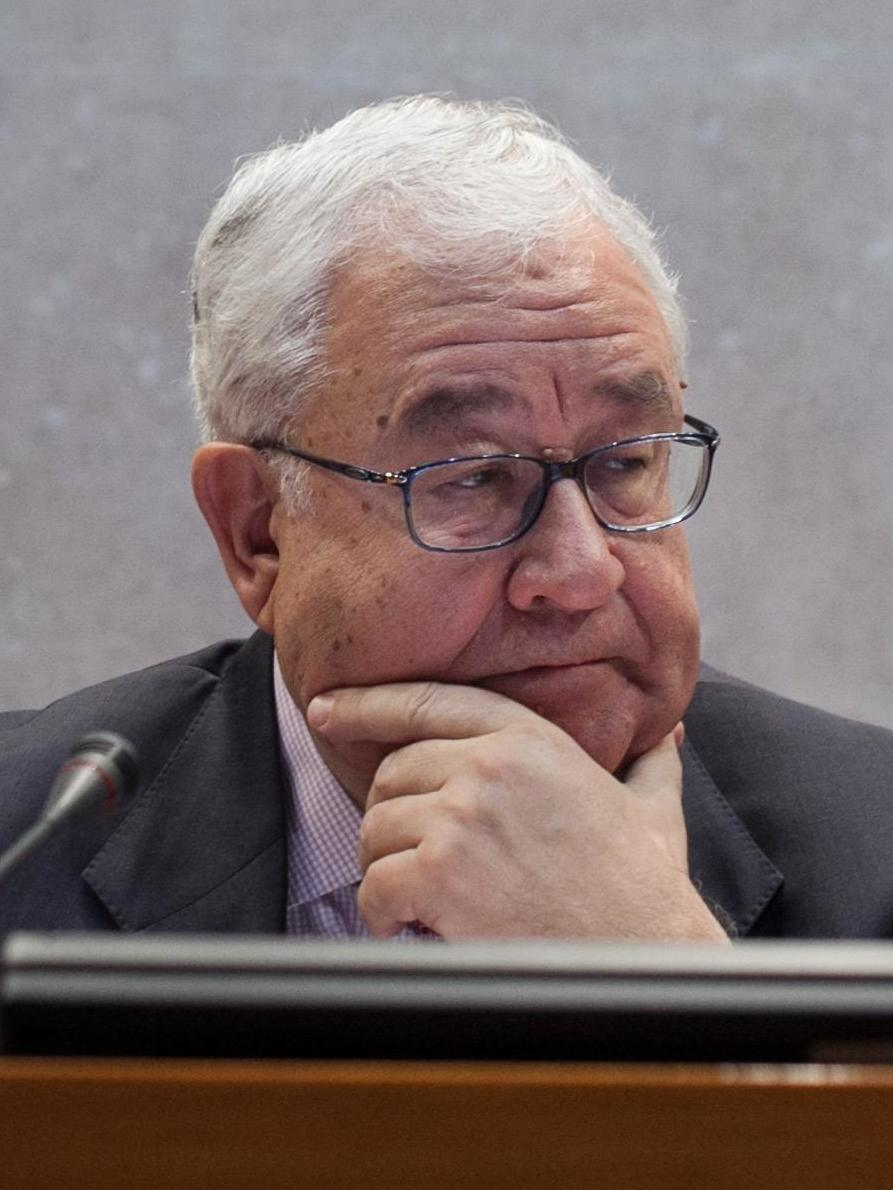
Biel in 2015

José Ángel Biel Rivera (born 1 May 1946) is a Spanish former politician. As a member of the Union of the Democratic Centre (UCD) he was elected to the Constituent Cortes and the Senate in the Spanish transition to democracy.

In 1983, he left for the Aragonese Party (PAR), of which he was president from 2000 to 2015. He served in the first eight legislatures of the Cortes of Aragon from 1983 to 2015, and was the President of the Cortes for the final four years. He was Vice President of the Government of Aragon from 1999 to 2011, in coalition with the Spanish Socialist Workers' Party (PSOE) under Marcelino Iglesias.

== Biography ==
Born in Teruel, Biel is married and has one daughter. He graduated in Law, becoming a lawyer and a civil servant in the National Institute of Social Security (INSS). He began his political career during the Spanish transition to democracy as a member of the Union of the Democratic Centre (UDC), being elected as a deputy in the Constituent Cortes in 1977 and to the first Senate in 1979.

Following the UCD's collapse, Biel joined the Aragonese Party (PAR). He was elected to the Cortes of Aragon in the first elections in 1983. In 1987, he became an advisor in the government of PAR president Hipólito Gómez de las Roces, retaining his position under successor Emilio Eiroa four years later. In 1995, the PAR left power as the People's Party (PP) won the election; Biel became his party's spokesman in the Cortes.

In 1999, Biel's PAR formed the Aragonese government with Marcelino Iglesias of the Spanish Socialist Workers' Party (PSOE) as president and Biel the vice president. This lasted for three legislatures until 2011, when the PP won under leader Luisa Fernanda Rudi and formed a coalition with the PAR; Biel became President of the Cortes, the speaker.

Biel retired from politics before the 2015 election. He announced his plans to retire in December 2013 and said that he would spend his retirement making model boats; he refused to endorse a successor as PAR leader, including the eventual new president Arturo Aliaga. In February 2020, he began hosting a radio show on Cadena COPE.
