= 1995 Aragonese regional election =

Election in the Spanish region of Aragon

- 28 May 1995

All 67 seats in the Cortes of Aragon 34 seats needed for a majority
- Opinion polls
- Registered: 993,975 ▲3.6%
- Turnout: 706,954 (71.1%) ▲6.7 pp
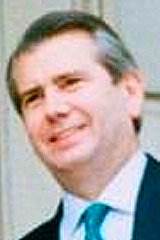

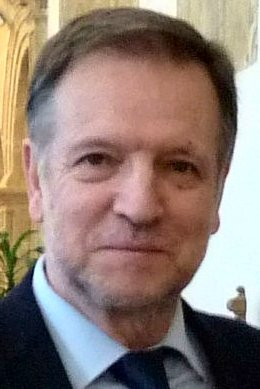

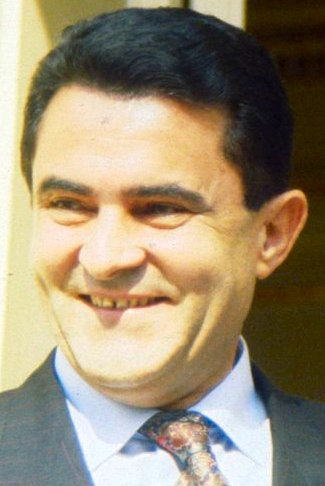

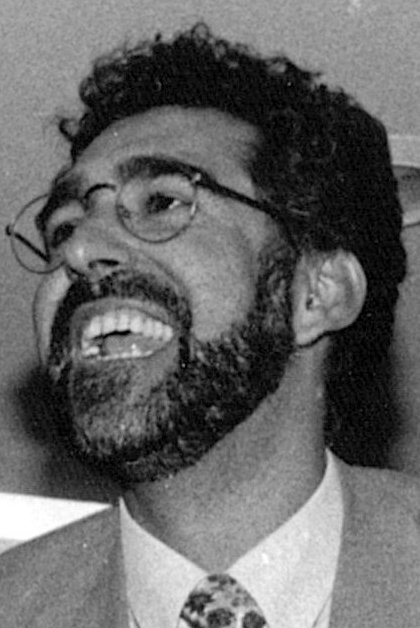
	First party	Second party	Third party
Leader	Santiago Lanzuela	Marcelino Iglesias	Emilio Eiroa
Party	PP	PSOE	PAR
Leader since	24 September 1993	15 February 1995	25 June 1991
Leader's seat	Zaragoza	Huesca	Zaragoza
Last election	17 seats, 20.7%	30 seats, 40.3%	17 seats, 24.7%
Seats won	27	19	14
Seat change	▲10	▼11	▼3
Popular vote	263,524	180,728	143,573
Percentage	37.5%	25.7%	20.4%
Swing	▲16.8 pp	▼14.6 pp	▼4.3 pp
	Fourth party	Fifth party
Leader	Miguel Ángel Fustero	Chesús Bernal
Party	IU	CHA
Leader since	1994	29 June 1986
Leader's seat	Zaragoza	Zaragoza
Last election	3 seats, 6.7%	0 seats, 2.3%
Seats won	5	2
Seat change	▲2	▲2
Popular vote	64,685	34,077
Percentage	9.2%	4.8%
Swing	▲2.5 pp	▲2.5 pp
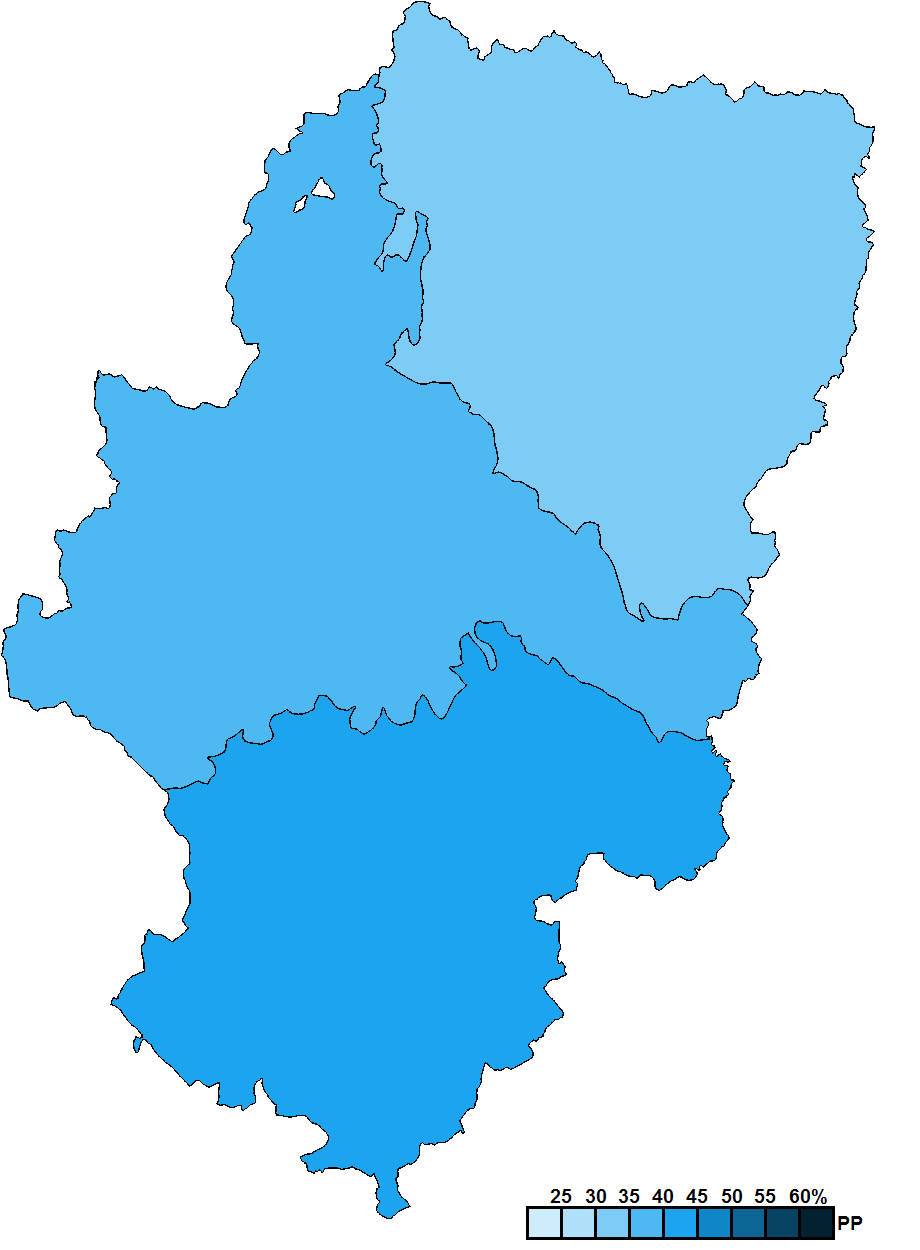
- Constituency results map for the Cortes of Aragon
President before election
Ramón Tejedor (acting)
PSOE
President after election
Santiago Lanzuela
PP

A regional election was held in Aragon on 28 May 1995 to elect the 4th Cortes of the autonomous community. All 67 seats in the Cortes were up for election. It was held concurrently with regional elections in twelve other autonomous communities and local elections all across Spain.

The coalition government formed between the Aragonese Party (PAR) and the People's Party (PP) in the aftermath of the 1991 election suffered from growing divergences between the two governing parties, leading to the defection of regional PP deputy Emilio Gomáriz. The political crisis within Emilio Eiroa's government, as well as his launching of a regional radio and television network criticized as rushed by the opposition, led to the Spanish Socialist Workers' Party (PSOE) tabling a motion of no confidence which succeeded thanks to Gomáriz's support, resulting in regional PSOE leader José Marco becoming new Aragonese president. Marco's tenure immediately became plagued by a string of corruption scandals, which ultimately led to his own party disowning and forcing his resignation as regional president in January 1995. The PSOE's subsequent failure in electing a replacement candidate (Ángela Abós) saw the regional presidency minister, Ramón Tejedor, serving out in an acting capacity for the remainder of Marco's term.

The election resulted in a major increase for the PP, which went on to win the election by more than doubling its 1991 raw vote and gaining ten seats. These gains came mostly at the expense of the PSOE, which suffered from Marco's scandals and the internal infighting of the previous year. The PAR, which had ruled the region between 1987 and 1993, lost ground for the second consecutive time and was displaced to third place. United Left (IU) improved its position and obtained the best result in its history, whereas the left-wing regionalist Aragonese Union (CHA) secured parliamentary representation for the first time.

The electoral outcome and the discrediting of the PSOE forced the PAR to enter into negotiations with the PP. In exchange for the speakership of the Cortes and two cabinet portfolios, the PAR formed a new coalition government with the PP, under the presidency of Santiago Lanzuela.

== Background ==
The 1991 election had seen the Aragonese Party (PAR) retaining power through a coalition agreement with the People's Party (PP), with Emilio Eiroa succeeding Hipólito Gómez de las Roces as regional president over the latter's refusal to let the PP into government. The Spanish Socialist Workers' Party (PSOE), which remained in opposition for a second time despite emerging as the largest party overall, was thrown into an internal crisis that saw provincial deputation of Zaragoza, José Marco, being elected as new leader in March 1992.

During his first year in office, Eiroa oversaw the launching of a regional radio and television network, the Aragonese Radio and Television Corporation (CARTV), which was criticized by opposition parties as "deficient" and "low quality". Eiroa was also forced to deal with the growing divergences between the two governing partners, the PAR and the PP, which saw the latter lose several party members (the most notable being deputy Emilio Gomáriz, whose defection left Eiroa's government in minority status in the regional parliament). A political crisis erupted over an attempt by the PP to secure greater prominence in the government following the 1993 Spanish general election, which prompted the PSOE to table a motion of no confidence in September 1993. The vote succeeded thanks to Gomáriz crossing the floor in support of the motion, leading to accusations of vote buying from both the PAR and PP (in what came to be known as the Gomarcazo), and in PSOE's José Marco becoming new Aragonese president.

Marco's tenure was initially dominated by his opposition to a Spanish government proposal to regulate water transfers from the Ebro River to other regions (the National Hydrological Plan), but this was quickly overshadowed by a number of scandals. Shortly after taking office, he became embroiled in an embezzlement scandal over the purchase of an armchair for his home, for which he would be tried and convicted in 1995. In September 1994, he was accused of having concealed the purchase of four properties in his asset declarations; two months later, he became involved in a political espionage scandal against rivals within his own party. Further scandals included an alleged forgery of public documents, as well as an unlawful awarding of government contracts to relatives. An internal crisis ensued in which Marco clashed with other party sectors over his continuity at the helm of the Aragonese government, with the PSOE's national leadership ultimately disowning him despite his attempt to hold on until the next regional election. Marco barely survived a vote of no confidence tabled against him by the opposition PAR in December 1994, but mounting pressure led to a cabinet crisis in January 1995, and to his own resignation as regional premier in the ensuing days.

Regional culture minister Ángela Abós was proposed to succeed Marco as president, but United Left (IU)'s decision to block any investiture from a PSOE candidate resulted in a political gridlock in February 1995. With various proposals to form technocratic or unity governments failing to materialize, the regional presidency minister, Ramón Tejedor, was forced to serve in an acting capacity until the next election. Concurrently, the national PSOE leadership moved to strip Marco of his authority as regional party leader, sidelining him from the process of nominating his successor, and ultimately taking over the party's branch in Aragon.

== Overview ==
Under the 1982 Statute of Autonomy, the Cortes of Aragon was the unicameral legislature of the homonymous autonomous community, having legislative power in devolved matters, as well as the ability to grant or withdraw confidence from a regional president. The electoral and procedural rules were supplemented by national law provisions.

=== Date ===
The term of the Cortes of Aragon expired four years after the date of its previous ordinary election, with election day being fixed for the fourth Sunday of May every four years. The election decree was required to be issued no later than 54 days before the scheduled election date and published on the following day in the Official Gazette of Aragon (BOA). The previous election was held on 26 May 1991, setting the date for election day on the fourth Sunday of May four years later, which was 28 May 1995.

Amendments earlier in 1995 granted the regional president the prerogative to dissolve the Cortes of Aragon at any given time and call a snap election, provided that no motion of no confidence was in process, no nationwide election had been called and that dissolution did not occur either during the first legislative session or during the last year of parliament before its planned expiration, nor before one year after a previous one. In the event of an investiture process failing to elect a regional president within a two-month period from the Cortes's reconvening, the chamber was to be automatically dissolved and a fresh election called. Any snap election held as a result of these circumstances did not alter the date of the chamber's next ordinary election, with elected lawmakers serving the remainder of its original four-year term.

The election to the Cortes of Aragon was officially called on 4 April 1995 with the publication of the corresponding decree in the BOA, setting election day for 28 May and scheduling for the chamber to reconvene on 26 June.

=== Electoral system ===
Voting for the Cortes was based on universal suffrage, comprising all Spanish nationals over 18 years of age, registered in Aragon and with full political rights, provided that they had not been deprived of the right to vote by a final sentence, nor were legally incapacitated.

The Cortes of Aragon had a minimum of 60 and a maximum of 75 seats, with electoral provisions fixing its size at 67. All were elected in three multi-member constituencies—corresponding to the provinces of Huesca, Teruel and Zaragoza, each of which was assigned an initial minimum of 13 seats and the remaining 28 distributed in proportion to population (with the seat-to-population ratio in the most populated province not exceeding 2.75 times that of the least populated one)—using the D'Hondt method and closed-list proportional voting, with a three percent-threshold of valid votes (including blank ballots) in each constituency. The use of this electoral method resulted in a higher effective threshold depending on district magnitude and vote distribution.

As a result of the aforementioned allocation, each Cortes constituency was entitled the following seats:

Seats	Constituencies
33	Zaragoza
18	Huesca
16	Teruel

The law did not provide for by-elections to fill vacant seats; instead, any vacancies arising after the proclamation of candidates and during the legislative term were filled by the next candidates on the party lists or, when required, by designated substitutes.

=== Outgoing parliament ===
The table below shows the composition of the parliamentary groups in the chamber at the time of the election call.

Parliamentary composition in April 1995
Groups	Parties	Legislators	
Groups	Parties	Seats	Total
Socialist Parliamentary Group	PSOE	30	30
Aragonese Party Parliamentary Group	PAR	17	17
People's Parliamentary Group in the Cortes of Aragon	PP	16	16
Aragon Alternative Convergence Parliamentary Group	IU	3	3
Mixed Parliamentary Group	INDEP	1 (Note: Emilio Gomáriz, former PP legislator.)	1

== Parties and candidates ==
The electoral law allowed for parties and federations registered in the interior ministry, alliances and groupings of electors to present lists of candidates. Parties and federations intending to form an alliance were required to inform the relevant electoral commission within 10 days of the election call, whereas groupings of electors needed to secure the signature of at least one percent of the electorate in the constituencies for which they sought election, disallowing electors from signing for more than one list.

Below is a list of the main parties and alliances which contested the election:

Candidacy	Parties and alliances	Leading candidate	Ideology	Previous result		Gov.	Ref.
Candidacy	Parties and alliances	Leading candidate	Ideology	Vote %	Seats	Gov.	Ref.
PSOE	List: Spanish Socialist Workers' Party (PSOE)	Marcelino Iglesias	Social democracy	40.3%	30	Yes	
PAR	List: Aragonese Party (PAR)	Emilio Eiroa	Regionalism; Centrism	24.7%	17	No	
PP	List: People's Party (PP)	Santiago Lanzuela	Conservatism; Christian democracy	20.7%	17	No	
IU	List: United Left of Aragon (IU) – Communist Party of Aragon (PCE–A) – Socialist Action Party (PASOC) – Republican Left (IR)	Miguel Ángel Fustero	Socialism; Communism	6.7%	3	No	
CHA	List: Aragonese Union (CHA)	Chesús Bernal	Aragonese nationalism Eco-socialism	2.3%	0	No	

== Opinion polls ==
The tables below list opinion polling results in reverse chronological order, showing the most recent first and using the dates when the survey fieldwork was done, as opposed to the date of publication. Where the fieldwork dates are unknown, the date of publication is given instead. The highest percentage figure in each polling survey is displayed with its background shaded in the leading party's colour. If a tie ensues, this is applied to the figures with the highest percentages. The "Lead" column on the right shows the percentage-point difference between the parties with the highest percentages in a poll.

=== Voting intention estimates ===
The table below lists weighted voting intention estimates. Refusals are generally excluded from the party vote percentages, while question wording and the treatment of "don't know" responses and those not intending to vote may vary between polling organisations. When available, seat projections determined by the polling organisations are displayed below (or in place of) the percentages in a smaller font; 34 seats were required for an absolute majority in the Cortes of Aragon.

Color key:

Exit poll

Polling firm/Commissioner	Fieldwork date	Sample size	Turnout	PSOE	PAR	PP	IU	CDS	CHA	Lead
1995 regional election	28 May 1995	—N/a	71.1	25.7; 19	20.4; 14	37.5; 27	9.2; 5	–	4.8; 2	11.8
Eco Consulting/RTVE	28 May 1995	?	?	22.4; 16/18	19.4; 13/14	41.2; 29/31	8.3; 3/4	–	–	18.8
A+M/Heraldo de Aragón	21 May 1995	?	?	23.2; 16/17	21.2 ?	38.1; 28/29	–	–	–	14.9
Demoscopia/El País	10–15 May 1995	700	?	24.2; 17	20.9; 15	37.4; 29	9.7; 6	–	–	14.9
CIS	24 Apr–10 May 1995	1,100	68.6	23.2	26.7	37.8	10.0	–	–	11.1
1994 EP election	12 Jun 1994	—N/a	58.4	28.7 (22)	7.7 (4)	44.9 (33)	13.7 (8)	1.1 (0)	–	16.2
1993 general election	6 Jun 1993	—N/a	78.2	34.3 (26)	19.0 (12)	32.9 (24)	9.7 (5)	1.3 (0)	0.8 (0)	1.4
1991 regional election	26 May 1991	—N/a	64.3	40.3; 30	24.7; 17	20.7; 17	6.7; 3	3.1; 0	2.3; 0	15.6

=== Voting preferences ===
The table below lists raw, unweighted voting preferences.

Polling firm/Commissioner	Fieldwork date	Sample size	PSOE	PAR	PP	IU	CDS	CHA	Question	X mark	Lead
1995 regional election (Note: Does not include non-resident citizens.)	28 May 1995	—N/a	18.0	14.4	26.5	6.5	–	3.4	—N/a	28.4	8.5
CIS	24 Apr–10 May 1995	1,100	15.5	19.3	26.8	4.5	0.2	–	22.7	8.1	7.5
CIS	2–17 Mar 1995	1,094	14.4	19.2	21.9	8.0	0.4	–	22.6	9.3	2.7
1994 EP election	12 Jun 1994	—N/a	16.7	4.5	26.3	8.0	0.6	–	—N/a	41.3	9.6
CIS	28 Apr–12 May 1994	1,493	14.5	23.6	14.5	8.5	0.4	–	25.9	10.6	9.1
1993 general election	6 Jun 1993	—N/a	26.7	14.9	25.7	7.6	1.0	0.7	—N/a	21.5	1.0
CIS	11–24 Nov 1992	1,549	18.3	18.6	10.9	3.1	0.4	–	36.7	10.9	0.3
1991 regional election	26 May 1991	—N/a	25.7	15.7	13.2	4.3	2.0	1.5	—N/a	35.5	10.0

=== Victory preferences ===
The table below lists opinion polling on the victory preferences for each party in the event of a regional election taking place.

Polling firm/Commissioner	Fieldwork date	Sample size	PSOE	PAR	PP	IU	Other/ None	Question	Lead
CIS	24 Apr–10 May 1995	1,100	18.4	24.4	27.3	–	0.7	29.1	2.9
CIS	2–17 Mar 1995	1,094	18.7	28.2	25.8	–	–	27.3	2.4
CIS	28 Apr–12 May 1994	1,493	17.8	27.2	16.8	10.2	–	28.0	9.4

=== Victory likelihood ===
The table below lists opinion polling on the perceived likelihood of victory for each party in the event of a regional election taking place.

Polling firm/Commissioner	Fieldwork date	Sample size	PSOE	PAR	PP	Other/ None	Question	Lead
CIS	24 Apr–10 May 1995	1,100	8.5	10.9	42.6	–	38.0	31.7
CIS	2–17 Mar 1995	1,094	13.6	11.7	39.7	–	35.0	26.1

=== Preferred President ===
The table below lists opinion polling on leader preferences to become president of the Government of Aragon.

Polling firm/Commissioner	Fieldwork date	Sample size					Other/ None/ Not care	Question	Lead
Polling firm/Commissioner	Fieldwork date	Sample size	Iglesias PSOE	Eiroa PAR	Lanzuela PP	Lacasa IU	Other/ None/ Not care	Question	Lead
CIS	24 Apr–10 May 1995	1,100	16.4	23.0	23.4	–	2.0	35.2	0.4
CIS	2–17 Mar 1995	1,094	9.2	22.7	13.6	2.5	3.4	48.6	9.1

== Results ==
=== Overall ===
← Summary of the 28 May 1995 Cortes of Aragon election results →
Parties and alliances	Popular vote			Seats	
Parties and alliances	Votes	%	±pp	Total	+/−
People's Party (PP)	263,524	37.50	+16.82	27	+10
Spanish Socialist Workers' Party (PSOE)	180,728	25.72	−14.62	19	−11
Aragonese Party (PAR)	143,573	20.43	−4.25	14	−3
United Left of Aragon (IU)	64,685	9.20	+2.46	5	+2
Aragonese Union (CHA)	34,077	4.85	+2.55	2	+2
Platform of Independents of Spain (PIE)	2,349	0.33	New	0	±0
Aragonese Unity (UA)	1,342	0.19	New	0	±0
SOS Nature (SOS)	923	0.13	New	0	±0
Spanish Phalanx of the CNSO (FE–JONS)	445	0.06	New	0	±0
Blank ballots	11,098	1.58	+0.28		
Total	702,744			67	±0
Valid votes	702,744	99.40	+0.10		
Invalid votes	4,210	0.60	−0.10		
Votes cast / turnout	706,954	71.12	+6.73		
Abstentions	287,021	28.88	−6.73		
Registered voters	993,975				

Popular vote
PP	37.50%
PSOE	25.72%
PAR	20.43%
IU	9.20%
CHA	4.85%
Others	0.72%
Blank ballots	1.58%

Seats
PP	40.30%
PSOE	28.36%
PAR	20.90%
IU	7.46%
CHA	2.99%

=== Distribution by constituency ===
Constituency	PP		PSOE		PAR		IU		CHA	
Constituency	%	S	%	S	%	S	%	S	%	S
Huesca	33.2	7	31.7	6	21.4	4	6.8	1	4.1	−
Teruel	40.8	7	31.6	5	18.3	3	5.6	1	2.1	−
Zaragoza	38.0	13	23.1	8	20.6	7	10.5	3	5.5	2
Total	37.5	27	25.7	19	20.4	14	9.2	5	4.8	2

== Aftermath ==
=== Government formation ===
The election outcome and the PSOE's unpopularity following Marco's tenure prompted the PAR to engage in negotiations with the PP as the largest party, ultimately leading to the formation of a new coalition government, this time with the PP as the leading party. By virtue of this alliance, the regional PP leader, Santiago Lanzuela, become the new president of the Government of Aragon, whereas the PAR's candidate and former regional president, Emilio Eiroa, became the new speaker of the Cortes of Aragon.

Investiture; Nomination of Santiago Lanzuela (PP)
Ballot →	7 July 1995
Required majority →	34 out of 67
Yes: • PP (27); • PAR (13)	40 / 67
No: • PSOE (18); • IU (5); • CHA (2)	25 / 67
Abstentions	0 / 67
Absentees: • PSOE (1); • PAR (1)	2 / 67

== Bibliography ==
- Ley Orgánica 8/1982, de 10 de agosto, de Estatuto de Autonomía de Aragón (Organic Law 8/1982). Official State Gazette (in Spanish). 10 August 1982. BOE-A-1982-20819.
- Ley Orgánica 5/1985, de 19 de junio, del Régimen Electoral General (Organic Law 5/1985). Official State Gazette (in Spanish). 19 June 1985 [version as of 24 March 1995]. BOE-A-1985-11672.
- Ley 2/1987, de 16 de febrero, Electoral de la Comunidad Autónoma de Aragón (Law 2/1987). Official State Gazette (in Spanish). 16 February 1987 [version as of 4 April 1995]. BOE-A-1987-5339.
- Ley 1/1995, de 16 de febrero, del Presidente y del Gobierno de Aragón (Law 1/1995). Official State Gazette (in Spanish). 16 February 1995. BOE-A-1995-7642.
- Decreto de 3 de abril de 1995, de la Presidencia de la Diputación General de Aragón, por el que se convocan elecciones a las Cortes de Aragón (Decree). Official Gazette of Aragon (in Spanish). 3 April 1995.
