= Chesús Bernal =

Spanish politician and academic (1960–2019)

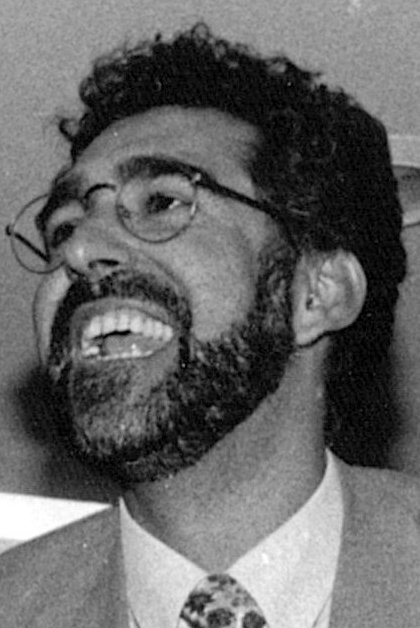

Chesús Gregorio Bernal Bernal (8 January 1960 – 22 March 2019) was a Spanish academic and politician. He was a professor at the University of Zaragoza, specialising in Romance languages. In 1986, he co-founded the Chunta Aragonesista (CHA), and served in the Cortes of Aragon from 1995 to 2011.

== Biography ==
Bernal was born in Valtorres in the Province of Zaragoza. He began his studies in Romance Philology at the University of Salamanca but finished it at the University of Zaragoza. He specialised in the French language, though his doctoral thesis was on Occitan. He and Francho Nagore edited a 1999 dictionary of the Aragonese language. He taught French at his alma mater, where he was a professor.

On holiday in Galicia in 1986, he studied left-wing Galician nationalism, meeting with Camilo Nogueira of the Galician Left. Inspired by this research, later that year he was a founding member of the Chunta Aragonesista (CHA), and was their leader as they entered the Cortes of Aragon in the 1995 elections, staying in office until 2011. In the 2003 elections, CHA had their best results, coming third with nine deputies, but regional president Marcelino Iglesias (PSOE) preferred a coalition with the eight deputies of the Aragonese Party (PAR).

Bernal was married to journalist Elena Bandrés, who was also a professor at the University of Zaragoza; they had three sons. He was a fan of Real Zaragoza, and went to watch the team in the last week of his illness.

Bernal died of pancreatic cancer in Zaragoza at the age of 59. He lay in rest at the Aljafería, the seat of the Cortes of Aragon. Tributes were paid by local and regional politicians of all parties. In May 2021, a sociocultural centre in Valtorres was named after him.
