= 1999 Aragonese regional election =

Election in the Spanish region of Aragon

- 13 June 1999

All 67 seats in the Cortes of Aragon 34 seats needed for a majority
- Opinion polls
- Registered: 1,017,735 ▲2.4%
- Turnout: 657,464 (64.6%) ▼6.5 pp
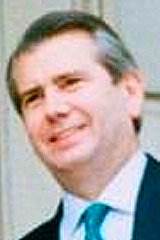

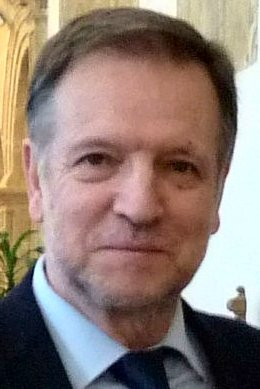

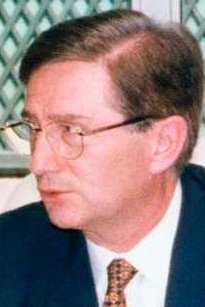

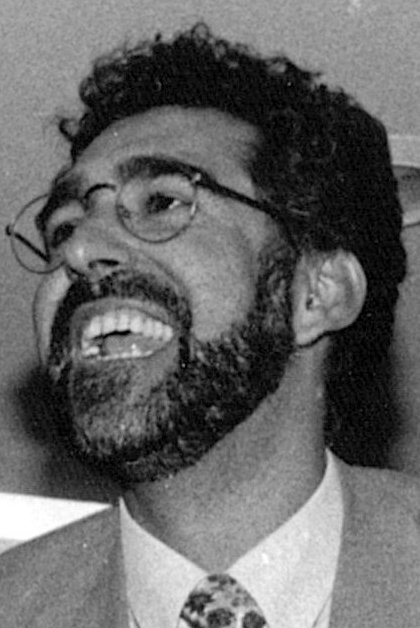

	First party	Second party	Third party
Leader	Santiago Lanzuela	Marcelino Iglesias	José María Mur
Party	PP	PSOE	PAR
Leader since	24 September 1993	15 February 1995	1995
Leader's seat	Zaragoza	Zaragoza	Zaragoza
Last election	27 seats, 37.5%	19 seats, 25.7%	14 seats, 20.4%
Seats won	28	23	10
Seat change	▲1	▲4	▼4
Popular vote	249,458	201,117	86,519
Percentage	38.2%	30.8%	13.3%
Swing	▲0.7 pp	▲5.1 pp	▼7.1 pp
	Fourth party	Fifth party
Leader	Chesús Bernal	Jesús Lacasa
Party	CHA	IU
Leader since	29 June 1986	1998
Leader's seat	Zaragoza	Zaragoza
Last election	2 seats, 4.8%	5 seats, 9.2%
Seats won	5	1
Seat change	▲3	▼4
Popular vote	72,101	25,040
Percentage	11.0%	3.9%
Swing	▲6.2 pp	▼5.3 pp
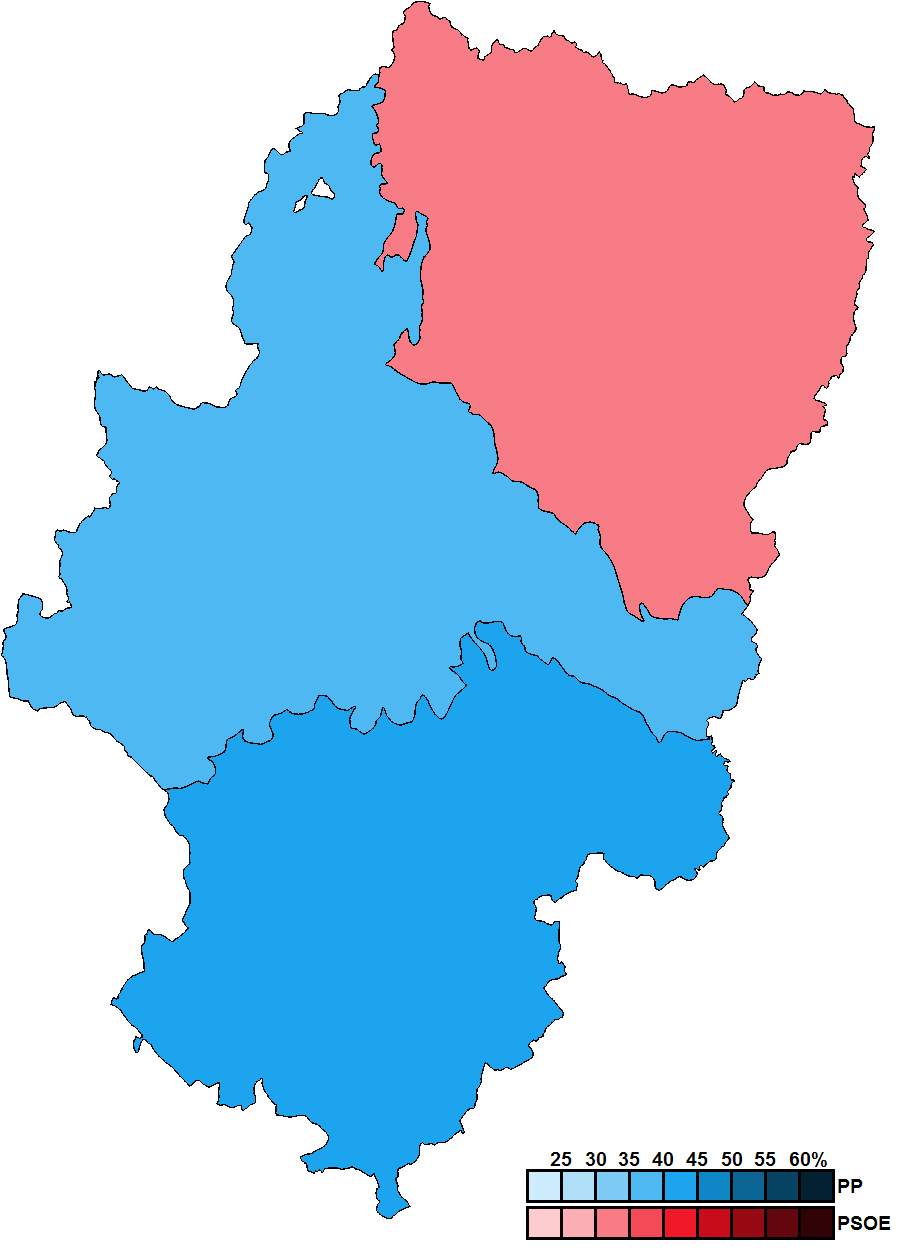
- Constituency results map for the Cortes of Aragon
President before election
Santiago Lanzuela
PP
President after election
Marcelino Iglesias
PSOE

A regional election was held in Aragon on 13 June 1999 to elect the 5th Cortes of the autonomous community. All 67 seats in the Cortes were up for election. It was held concurrently with regional elections in twelve other autonomous communities and local elections all across Spain, as well as the 1999 European Parliament election.

The election saw increases in both vote share and seats for the People's Party (PP), which had formed the Government of Aragon since 1995, and the Spanish Socialist Workers' Party (PSOE). The Aragonese Party (PAR) continued its long-term decline from its peak at the 1987 election while on the left, Chunta Aragonesista (CHA) gained most of United Left (IU) former support, which lost 4 of its 5 seats.

Despite winning the election and gaining one seat from 1995, the PP went into opposition as incumbent President of Aragon Santiago Lanzuela was unable to gather the support from his former coalition partner the PAR. Instead, the PAR supported Socialist Marcelino Iglesias as new regional president, entering into a coalition administration with the PSOE.

== Overview ==
Under the 1982 Statute of Autonomy, the Cortes of Aragon was the unicameral legislature of the homonymous autonomous community, having legislative power in devolved matters, as well as the ability to grant or withdraw confidence from a regional president. The electoral and procedural rules were supplemented by national law provisions.

=== Date ===
The term of the Cortes of Aragon expired four years after the date of its previous ordinary election, with election day being fixed for the fourth Sunday of May every four years, but a 1998 amendment allowed for regional elections held in May 1995 to be held concurrently with European Parliament elections, provided that they were scheduled for within a four month-timespan. The election decree was required to be issued no later than 54 days before the scheduled election date and published on the following day in the Official Gazette of Aragon (BOA). The previous election was held on 28 May 1995, setting the date for election day concurrently with that year's European Parliament election on 13 June 1999.

The regional president had the prerogative to dissolve the Cortes of Aragon at any given time and call a snap election, provided that no motion of no confidence was in process, no nationwide election had been called and that dissolution did not occur either during the first legislative session or during the last year of parliament before its planned expiration, nor before one year after a previous one. In the event of an investiture process failing to elect a regional president within a two-month period from the Cortes's reconvening, the chamber was to be automatically dissolved and a fresh election called. Any snap election held as a result of these circumstances did not alter the date of the chamber's next ordinary election, with elected lawmakers serving the remainder of its original four-year term.

The election to the Cortes of Aragon was officially called on 20 April 1999 with the publication of the corresponding decree in the BOA, setting election day for 13 June and scheduling for the chamber to reconvene on 7 July.

=== Electoral system ===
Voting for the Cortes was based on universal suffrage, comprising all Spanish nationals over 18 years of age, registered in Aragon and with full political rights, provided that they had not been deprived of the right to vote by a final sentence, nor were legally incapacitated.

The Cortes of Aragon had a minimum of 60 and a maximum of 75 seats, with electoral provisions fixing its size at 67. All were elected in three multi-member constituencies—corresponding to the provinces of Huesca, Teruel and Zaragoza, each of which was assigned an initial minimum of 13 seats and the remaining 28 distributed in proportion to population (with the seat-to-population ratio in the most populated province not exceeding 2.75 times that of the least populated one)—using the D'Hondt method and closed-list proportional voting, with a three percent-threshold of valid votes (including blank ballots) in each constituency. The use of this electoral method resulted in a higher effective threshold depending on district magnitude and vote distribution.

As a result of the aforementioned allocation, each Cortes constituency was entitled the following seats:

Seats	Constituencies
34	Zaragoza^{(+1)}
18	Huesca
15	Teruel^{(−1)}

The law did not provide for by-elections to fill vacant seats; instead, any vacancies arising after the proclamation of candidates and during the legislative term were filled by the next candidates on the party lists or, when required, by designated substitutes.

=== Outgoing parliament ===
The table below shows the composition of the parliamentary groups in the chamber at the time of the election call.

Parliamentary composition in April 1999
Groups	Parties	Legislators	
Groups	Parties	Seats	Total
People's Parliamentary Group in the Cortes of Aragon	PP	27	27
Socialist Parliamentary Group	PSOE	19	19
Aragonese Party Parliamentary Group	PAR	14	14
United Left of Aragon Parliamentary Group	IU	5	5
Mixed Parliamentary Group	CHA	2	2

== Parties and candidates ==
The electoral law allowed for parties and federations registered in the interior ministry, alliances and groupings of electors to present lists of candidates. Parties and federations intending to form an alliance were required to inform the relevant electoral commission within 10 days of the election call, whereas groupings of electors needed to secure the signature of at least one percent of the electorate in the constituencies for which they sought election, disallowing electors from signing for more than one list.

Below is a list of the main parties and alliances which contested the election:

Candidacy	Parties and alliances	Leading candidate	Ideology	Previous result		Gov.	Ref.
Candidacy	Parties and alliances	Leading candidate	Ideology	Vote %	Seats	Gov.	Ref.
PP	List: People's Party (PP)	Santiago Lanzuela	Conservatism; Christian democracy	37.5%	27	Yes	
PSOE	List: Spanish Socialist Workers' Party (PSOE)	Marcelino Iglesias	Social democracy	25.7%	19	No	
PAR	List: Aragonese Party (PAR)	José María Mur	Regionalism; Centrism	20.4%	14	Yes	
IU	List: United Left of Aragon (IU) – Communist Party of Aragon (PCE–A) – Socialist Action Party (PASOC) – Republican Left (IR) – Revolutionary Workers' Party (POR) – Workers' Revolutionary Party (PRT)	Jesús Lacasa	Socialism; Communism	9.2%	5	No	
CHA	List: Aragonese Union (CHA)	Chesús Bernal	Aragonese nationalism Eco-socialism	4.8%	2	No	

== Opinion polls ==
The tables below list opinion polling results in reverse chronological order, showing the most recent first and using the dates when the survey fieldwork was done, as opposed to the date of publication. Where the fieldwork dates are unknown, the date of publication is given instead. The highest percentage figure in each polling survey is displayed with its background shaded in the leading party's colour. If a tie ensues, this is applied to the figures with the highest percentages. The "Lead" column on the right shows the percentage-point difference between the parties with the highest percentages in a poll.

=== Voting intention estimates ===
The table below lists weighted voting intention estimates. Refusals are generally excluded from the party vote percentages, while question wording and the treatment of "don't know" responses and those not intending to vote may vary between polling organisations. When available, seat projections determined by the polling organisations are displayed below (or in place of) the percentages in a smaller font; 34 seats were required for an absolute majority in the Cortes of Aragon.

Polling firm/Commissioner	Fieldwork date	Sample size	Turnout	PP	PSOE	PAR	IU	CHA	Lead
1999 regional election	13 Jun 1999	—N/a	64.6	38.2; 28	30.8; 23	13.3; 10	3.9; 1	11.0; 5	7.4
Eco Consulting/ABC	24 May–2 Jun 1999	?	?	36.7; 26/27	26.0; 19/20	19.5; 13/14	7.3; 3/4	8.0; 4	10.7
Demoscopia/El País	26 May–1 Jun 1999	?	70	38.0; 28	29.2; 21	18.0; 11	6.0; 3	8.0; 4	8.8
Sigma Dos/El Mundo	20–26 May 1999	800	?	40.4; 27/30	30.4; 20/23	13.7; 9/10	8.1; 5	5.1; 2	10.0
CIS	3–20 May 1999	1,334	70.8	38.3; 27/28	24.1; 17/19	19.7; 12/14	7.8; 3/4	8.2; 4	14.2
1996 general election	3 Mar 1996	—N/a	77.5	47.9 (34)	34.6 (26)	(Note: Within PP.)	9.1 (5)	6.4 (2)	13.3
1995 regional election	28 May 1995	—N/a	71.1	37.5; 27	25.7; 19	20.4; 14	9.2; 5	4.8; 2	11.8

=== Voting preferences ===
The table below lists raw, unweighted voting preferences.

Polling firm/Commissioner	Fieldwork date	Sample size	PP	PSOE	PAR	IU	CHA	Question	X mark	Lead
1999 regional election (Note: Does not include non-resident citizens.)	13 Jun 1999	—N/a	24.9	20.0	8.6	2.5	7.2	—N/a	35.0	4.9
CIS	3–20 May 1999	1,334	24.5	15.5	8.3	3.1	5.0	33.7	8.6	9.0
1996 general election	3 Mar 1996	—N/a	37.2	26.8		7.1	5.0	—N/a	22.1	10.4
1995 regional election	28 May 1995	—N/a	26.5	18.0	14.4	6.5	3.4	—N/a	28.4	8.5

=== Victory preferences ===
The table below lists opinion polling on the victory preferences for each party in the event of a regional election taking place.

Polling firm/Commissioner	Fieldwork date	Sample size	PP	PSOE	PAR	IU	CHA	Other/ None	Question	Lead
CIS	3–20 May 1999	1,334	29.1	21.2	9.0	4.9	5.4	0.7	29.7	7.9

=== Victory likelihood ===
The table below lists opinion polling on the perceived likelihood of victory for each party in the event of a regional election taking place.

Polling firm/Commissioner	Fieldwork date	Sample size	PP	PSOE	PAR	IU	CHA	Other/ None	Question	Lead
CIS	3–20 May 1999	1,334	59.5	3.8	3.7	0.3	0.1	0.0	32.6	55.7

=== Preferred President ===
The table below lists opinion polling on leader preferences to become president of the Government of Aragon.

Polling firm/Commissioner	Fieldwork date	Sample size						Other/ None/ Not care	Question	Lead
Polling firm/Commissioner	Fieldwork date	Sample size	Lanzuela PP	Iglesias PSOE	Mur PAR	Bernal CHA	Lacasa IU	Other/ None/ Not care	Question	Lead
CIS	3–20 May 1999	1,334	29.5	9.5	5.3	1.3	5.2	1.4	47.8	20.0

== Results ==
=== Overall ===
← Summary of the 13 June 1999 Cortes of Aragon election results →
Parties and alliances	Popular vote			Seats	
Parties and alliances	Votes	%	±pp	Total	+/−
People's Party (PP)	249,458	38.21	+0.71	28	+1
Spanish Socialist Workers' Party (PSOE)	201,117	30.81	+5.09	23	+4
Aragonese Party (PAR)	86,519	13.25	−7.18	10	−4
Aragonese Union (CHA)	72,101	11.04	+6.19	5	+3
United Left of Aragon (IU)	25,040	3.86	−5.36	1	−4
SOS Nature (SOS)	3,621	0.55	+0.42	0	±0
Humanist Party (PH)	982	0.15	New	0	±0
Upper Aragonese Territory Regenerationist Group (ARTA)	373	0.06	New	0	±0
Blank ballots	13,599	2.08	+0.50		
Total	652,810			67	±0
Valid votes	652,810	99.29	−0.11		
Invalid votes	4,654	0.71	+0.11		
Votes cast / turnout	657,464	64.60	−6.52		
Abstentions	360,271	35.40	+6.52		
Registered voters	1,017,735				

Popular vote
PP	38.21%
PSOE	30.81%
PAR	13.25%
CHA	11.04%
IU	3.84%
Others	0.76%
Blank ballots	2.08%

Seats
PP	41.79%
PSOE	34.33%
PAR	14.93%
CHA	7.46%
IU	1.49%

=== Distribution by constituency ===
Constituency	PP		PSOE		PAR		CHA		IU	
Constituency	%	S	%	S	%	S	%	S	%	S
Huesca	33.8	7	34.2	7	16.1	3	9.0	1	3.4	−
Teruel	40.2	7	31.6	5	17.7	3	4.3	−	4.1	−
Zaragoza	39.0	14	29.8	11	11.7	4	12.8	4	3.9	1
Total	38.2	28	30.8	23	13.3	10	11.0	5	3.9	1

== Aftermath ==
=== Government formation ===
Investiture; Nomination of Marcelino Iglesias (PSOE)
Ballot →	29 July 1999
Required majority →	34 out of 67
Yes: • PSOE (23); • PAR (10); • IU (1)	34 / 67
No: • PP (28)	28 / 67
Abstentions: • CHA (5)	5 / 67
Absentees	0 / 67

== Bibliography ==
- Ley Orgánica 8/1982, de 10 de agosto, de Estatuto de Autonomía de Aragón (Organic Law 8/1982). Official State Gazette (in Spanish). 10 August 1982. BOE-A-1982-20819.
- Ley Orgánica 5/1985, de 19 de junio, del Régimen Electoral General (Organic Law 5/1985). Official State Gazette (in Spanish). 19 June 1985 [version as of 22 April 1999]. BOE-A-1985-11672.
- Ley 2/1987, de 16 de febrero, Electoral de la Comunidad Autónoma de Aragón (Law 2/1987). Official State Gazette (in Spanish). 16 February 1987 [version as of 17 April 1999]. BOE-A-1987-5339.
- Ley 1/1995, de 16 de febrero, del Presidente y del Gobierno de Aragón (Law 1/1995). Official State Gazette (in Spanish). 16 February 1995. BOE-A-1995-7642.
- Ley Orgánica 5/1996, de 30 de diciembre, de Reforma de la Ley Orgánica 8/1982, de 10 de agosto, de Estatuto de Autonomía de Aragón, modificada por la Ley Orgánica 6/1994, de 24 de marzo, de reforma de dicho Estatuto (Organic Law 5/1996). Official State Gazette (in Spanish). 30 December 1996. BOE-A-1996-29115.
- Decreto de 19 de abril de 1999, de la Presidencia del Gobierno de Aragón, por el que se convocan elecciones a las Cortes de Aragón (Decree). Official Gazette of Aragon (in Spanish). 19 April 1999.
