= Ángela Abós Ballarín =

Spanish writer and politician (1934–2022)

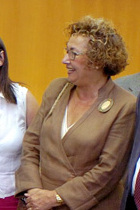

Minister of Science, Technology and University, Aragon
- In office 2006–2007
- President: Marcelino Iglesias

Minister of Education and Culture, Aragon
- In office 1994–1995
- President: José Marco

Member of the Cortes of Aragon for Huesca
- In office 1991–1999

Member of the Jaca City Council
- In office 1991–1994

Personal details
- Born: 1 October 1934 Benasque, Aragon, Spain
- Died: 16 July 2022 (aged 87) Jaca, Aragon, Spain
- Party: PSOE (since 1983)
- Other political affiliations: PSA (1976–1983)
- Children: 7
- Education: University of Salamanca

Ángela Abós Ballarín (1 October 1934 – 16 July 2022) was a Spanish writer and politician from Aragon. A member of the Spanish Socialist Workers' Party, Ballarín served in the Cortes of Aragon from 1991 until 1999.

== Early life and education ==
Ballarín was born on 1 October 1934 in the town of Benasque in Aragon. Her family owned a grocery store and an inn in the town. Ballarín graduated from the University of Salamanca in 1956 with a degree in Romance philology. Ballarín studied under José Manuel Blecua Teijeiro, Francisco Ynduráin Hernández, Fernando Lázaro Carreter, and other prominent philologists.

From 1962 to 1983, Ballarín was a professor at the Institute of Language and Literature in Jaca, Aragon.

== Political career ==
Ballarín became involved with politics in 1976, when she was one of the founders of the Socialist Party of Aragon, a short-lived minor party that was founded in her house. In 1982, Ballarín became a member of the Spanish Socialist Workers' Party (PSOE).

In 1983, Ballarín was appointed the provincial director of the Huesca Ministry of Education, a position she would hold until 1986. From 1987 until 1989, Ballarín was a deputy director in the Aragon Ministry of Education and Culture.

From 1991 until 1994, Ballarín served as a member of the Jaca City Council. In the 1991 Aragonese regional election, Ballarín was elected to the Cortes of Aragon; she was later re-elected in the 1995 Aragonese regional election. During her tenure in the Cortes, Ballarín was the only female member of the body. In 1994, she was appointed Regional Minister of Education and Culture, serving in this role until 1995. That year, following the retirement of José Marco as the president of Aragon, Marco nominated Ballarín to be his successor. Though Marco gave a well-received speech in the Cortes to support her, Ballarín was ultimately defeated in the leadership contest by Santiago Lanzuela.

From 1995 until 1999, Ballarín was the PSOE spokesman for the Education Commission. In 1999, Ballarín was appointed to the Social Council of the University of Zaragoza. She held this role until 2006, when she was appointed Regional Minister of Science, Technology and University by Marcelino Iglesias, the president of Aragon. Ballarín would serve as minister until 2007, when she became president of the Economic and Social Council of Aragon.

In 2007, Ballarín was indicted by the Superior Court of Justice of Aragon following allegations of workplace harassment. The complainant was a secretary at the Social Council of the University of Zaragoza who was unlawfully fired in 1995 and was legally reinstated to her position in 2005. However, the secretary alleged that after she was reinstated, Ballarín used her position to marginalise and attempt to force out the secretary. A judge dismissed the charges against Ballarín after determining that she likely had no sway over the secretary's marginalization.

== Personal life and death ==
Ballarín was one of the founders of the Aragonese Association of Writers, and she received several awards for her writing. In 1995, Ballarín was awarded the Centenary Medal by the International Olympic Committee, and she served as a member of UNESCO-Aragon. In 2006, Ballarín received the Golden Sabine Award, and in 2020, the Aragonese Association of Writers awarded her the Magnet Award.

Ballarín had seven children. She died on 16 July 2022. Following her death, Javier Lambán, the president of Aragon, described Ballarín as "educated, humanist and generous" and a "feminist without fuss", while Regional Minister of Culture Pilar Alegría stated that she was "a progressive and feminist woman who paved the way for many others. [She was a] defender of education as a fundamental pillar of the State".
