= President of the Government of Aragon =

Head of government in Aragon

President of the Government of Aragon President of the General Deputation of Aragon President of Aragon

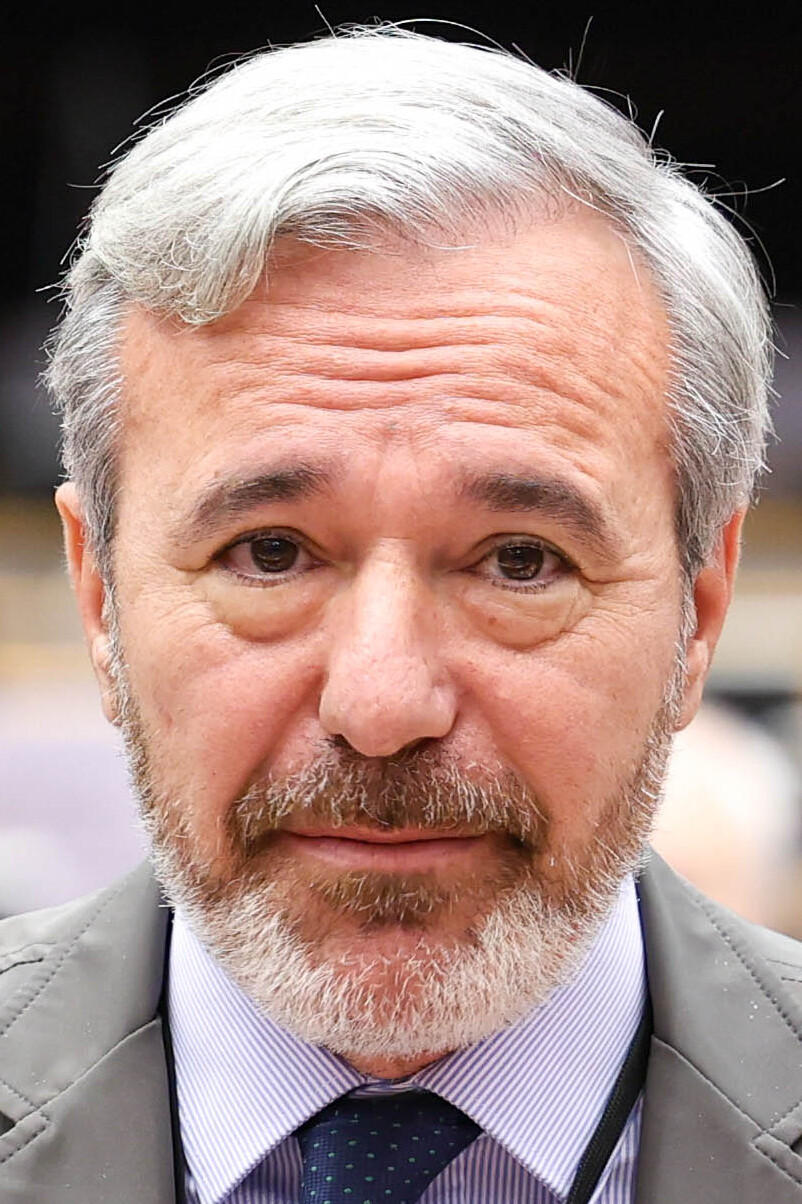
- Incumbent; Jorge Azcón since 11 August 2023
- Residence: Edificio Pignatelli
- Nominator: Cortes of Aragon
- Appointer: The Monarch; countersigned by the Prime Minister
- Inaugural holder: Juan Antonio Bolea
- Formation: 9 April 1978

The president of the Government of Aragon (Spanish: Presidente del Gobierno de Aragón), also known as the president of the General Deputation of Aragon (Spanish: Presidente de la Diputación General de Aragón) or, simply, the president of Aragon (Spanish: Presidente de Aragón), is the head of government of Aragon, an autonomous community in Spain. The President is elected to a four-year term by the Aragonese Corts and presides over the Government of Aragon.

== Election ==
Under Article 48 of the regional Statute of Autonomy, investiture processes to elect the president of the Government of Aragon require of an absolute majority—more than half the votes cast—to be obtained in the first ballot. If unsuccessful, a new ballot will be held 24 hours later requiring only of a simple majority—more affirmative than negative votes—to succeed. If the proposed candidate is not elected, successive proposals are to be transacted under the same procedure within a 10-day timespan. In the event of the investiture process failing to elect a regional president within a two-month period from the first ballot, the Corts shall be automatically dissolved and a fresh election called. Before 2007, the Statute provided for these parliamentary deadlocks to be solved by deeming the candidate from the party with the highest number of seats to be automatically elected.

== List of officeholders ==
Governments:

- UCD
- PSOE
- PP
- Mixed coalition

Portrait	Name (Birth–Death)	Term of office			Party	Government Composition	Election	Monarch (Reign)	Ref.
Portrait	Name (Birth–Death)	Took office	Left office	Duration	Party	Government Composition	Election	Monarch (Reign)	Ref.
	Juan Antonio Bolea (1930–2021)	9 April 1978	4 June 1979	2 years and 334 days	UCD	Bolea I UCD–PSOE–CAUD	N/A	King; Juan Carlos I (1975–2014)	
	Juan Antonio Bolea (1930–2021)	4 June 1979	21 April 1980	2 years and 334 days	UCD	Bolea II; UCD–PSOE	N/A	King; Juan Carlos I (1975–2014)	
	Juan Antonio Bolea (1930–2021)	21 April 1980	9 March 1981 (resigned)	2 years and 334 days	UCD	Bolea III; UCD	N/A	King; Juan Carlos I (1975–2014)	
During this interval, Minister Secretary-General José Ángel Biel served as acting officeholder.						Bolea III; UCD	N/A	King; Juan Carlos I (1975–2014)	
	Gaspar Castellano (1928–2019)	9 May 1981	7 October 1982	1 year and 201 days	UCD	Castellano I UCD	N/A	King; Juan Carlos I (1975–2014)	
	Gaspar Castellano (1928–2019)	7 October 1982	26 November 1982 (resigned)	1 year and 201 days	UCD	Castellano II; UCD	N/A	King; Juan Carlos I (1975–2014)	
During this interval, Minister of Governance José María Hernández de la Torre served as acting officeholder.						Castellano II; UCD	N/A	King; Juan Carlos I (1975–2014)	
	Juan Antonio de Andrés (1942–2026)	23 December 1982	3 June 1983	162 days	UCD	De Andrés; UCD/Ind. (Note: The UCD was dissolved as a political party on 18 February 1983.)	N/A	King; Juan Carlos I (1975–2014)	
	Juan Antonio de Andrés (1942–2026)	23 December 1982	3 June 1983	162 days	Independent	De Andrés; UCD/Ind.	N/A	King; Juan Carlos I (1975–2014)	
	Santiago Marraco (born 1938)	3 June 1983	30 July 1987	4 years and 57 days	PSOE	Marraco; PSOE	1983	King; Juan Carlos I (1975–2014)	
	Hipólito Gómez de las Roces (born 1932)	30 July 1987	12 July 1991	3 years and 347 days	PAR	Gómez de las Roces; PAR until Mar 1989; PAR–PP from Mar 1989	1987	King; Juan Carlos I (1975–2014)	
	Emilio Eiroa (1935–2013)	12 July 1991	15 September 1993 (censored)	2 years and 65 days	PAR	Eiroa; PAR–PP	1991	King; Juan Carlos I (1975–2014)	
	José Marco (born 1950)	17 September 1993	17 January 1995 (resigned)	1 year and 125 days	PSOE	Marco; PSOE	1991	King; Juan Carlos I (1975–2014)	
During this interval, Minister of the Presidency Ramón Tejedor served as acting officeholder.						Marco; PSOE	1991	King; Juan Carlos I (1975–2014)	
	Santiago Lanzuela (1948–2020)	11 July 1995	31 July 1999	4 years and 20 days	PP	Lanzuela; PP–PAR	1995	King; Juan Carlos I (1975–2014)	
	Marcelino Iglesias (born 1951)	31 July 1999	4 July 2003	11 years and 348 days	PSOE	Iglesias I PSOE–PAR	1999	King; Juan Carlos I (1975–2014)	
	Marcelino Iglesias (born 1951)	4 July 2003	6 July 2007	11 years and 348 days	PSOE	Iglesias II; PSOE–PAR	2003	King; Juan Carlos I (1975–2014)	
	Marcelino Iglesias (born 1951)	6 July 2007	14 July 2011	11 years and 348 days	PSOE	Iglesias III; PSOE–PAR	2007	King; Juan Carlos I (1975–2014)	
	Luisa Fernanda Rudi (born 1950)	14 July 2011	4 July 2015	3 years and 355 days	PP	Rudi; PP until Dec 2011; PP–PAR from Dec 2011	2011	King; Juan Carlos I (1975–2014)	
	Luisa Fernanda Rudi (born 1950)	14 July 2011	4 July 2015	3 years and 355 days	PP	Rudi; PP until Dec 2011; PP–PAR from Dec 2011	2011	King; Felipe VI (2014–present)	
	Javier Lambán (1957–2025)	4 July 2015	3 August 2019	8 years and 38 days	PSOE	Lambán I PSOE–CHA	2015	King; Felipe VI (2014–present)	
	Javier Lambán (1957–2025)	3 August 2019	11 August 2023	8 years and 38 days	PSOE	Lambán II; PSOE–Podemos–CHA–PAR	2019	King; Felipe VI (2014–present)	
	Jorge Azcón (born 1973)	11 August 2023	30 April 2026	3 years and 75 days	PP	Azcón I PP–Vox–PAR until Jul 2024; PP–PAR from Jul 2024	2023	King; Felipe VI (2014–present)	
	Jorge Azcón (born 1973)	30 April 2026	Incumbent	3 years and 75 days	PP	Azcón II; PP–Vox	2026	King; Felipe VI (2014–present)	

== See also ==
- Joaquín Ascaso Budría, President of the Regional Defence Council of Aragon
