= 1991 Aragonese regional election =

Election in the Spanish region of Aragon

- 26 May 1991

All 67 seats in the Cortes of Aragon 34 seats needed for a majority
- Opinion polls
- Registered: 959,596 ▲3.3%
- Turnout: 617,848 (64.4%) ▼5.3 pp

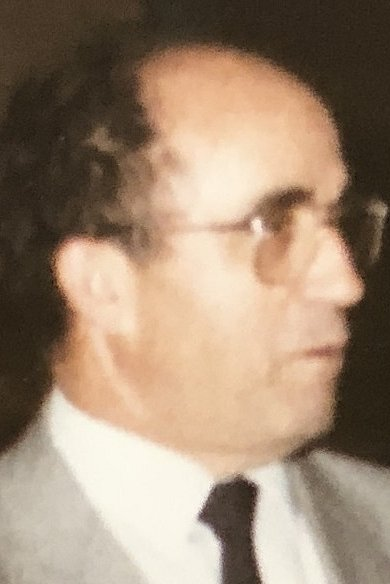

| | First party | Second party | Third party |
|---|---|---|---|
| Leader | José Marco | Hipólito Gómez de las Roces | José Ignacio Senao |
| Party | PSOE | PAR | PP |
| Leader since | 1991 | December 1977 | 1990 |
| Leader's seat | Zaragoza | Zaragoza | Zaragoza |
| Last election | 27 seats, 35.7% | 19 seats, 28.1% | 13 seats, 16.7% (Note: Results for AP (15.5%, 13 seats) and PDP (1.2%, 0 seats) in the 1987 election.) |
| Seats won | 30 | 17 | 17 |
| Seat change | ▲3 | ▼2 | ▲4 |
| Popular vote | 247,485 | 151,420 | 126,892 |
| Percentage | 40.3% | 24.7% | 20.7% |
| Swing | ▲4.6 pp | ▼3.4 pp | ▲4.0 pp |
| | Fourth party | Fifth party |
| Leader | Adolfo Burriel | José Luis Merino |
| Party | CAA–IU | CDS |
| Leader since | 1989 | 1983 |
| Leader's seat | Zaragoza | Zaragoza (lost) |
| Last election | 2 seats, 4.9% | 6 seats, 10.2% |
| Seats won | 3 | 0 |
| Seat change | ▲1 | ▼6 |
| Popular vote | 41,367 | 18,929 |
| Percentage | 6.7% | 3.1% |
| Swing | ▲1.8 pp | ▼7.1 pp |
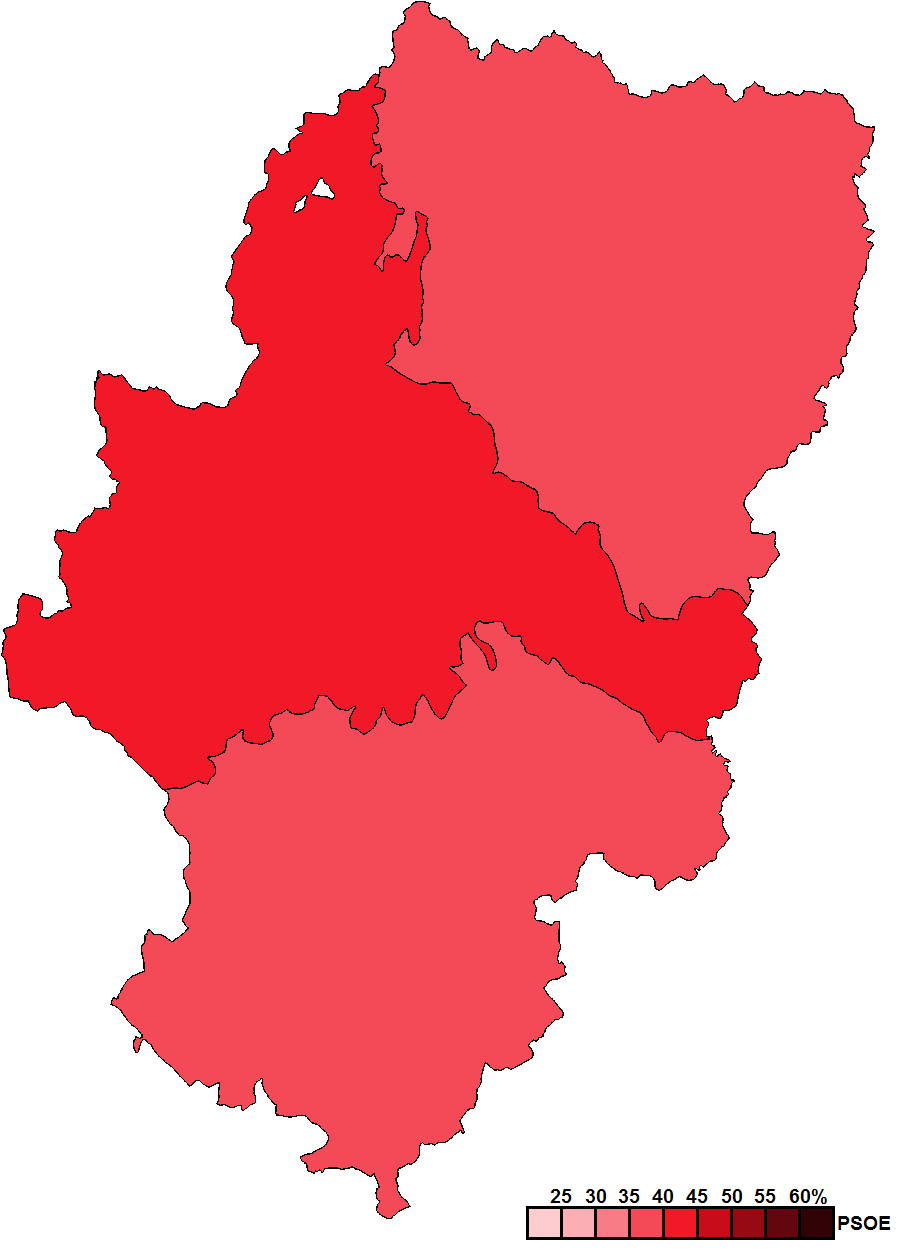
- Constituency results map for the Cortes of Aragon
President before election
Hipólito Gómez de las Roces
PAR
President after election
Emilio Eiroa
PAR

A regional election was held in Aragon on 26 May 1991 to elect the 3rd Cortes of the autonomous community. All 67 seats in the Cortes were up for election. It was held concurrently with regional elections in twelve other autonomous communities and local elections all across Spain.

The main loser in the election was the Democratic and Social Centre (CDS), which lost all of its 6 seats. The Aragonese Party (PAR) also lost two seats. The main gainers were the main two national parties, the Spanish Socialist Workers' Party (PSOE) and the newly created People's Party (PP). United Left also gained 1 seat.

The new legislature elected Emilio Eiroa of the PAR as the new President of Aragon by 34 votes to 33, after Hipólito Gómez de las Roces' refusal to reach a new agreement with the PP. All PAR and PP deputies supported Eiroa's election while the PSOE and IU deputies voted against. The tight arithmetic in the new legislature was further complicated in November 1992 when a PP deputy, Emilio Gomáriz, resigned from the PP, leaving him holding the balance of power between the PP-PAR bloc and the PSOE-IU bloc. In September 1993 the PSOE introduced a no-confidence motion against President Eiroa. In the subsequent vote Gomáriz appeared visibly nervous and claimed that he had received death threats against his children. He voted with the PSOE and IU deputies for Socialist José Marco as new President.

== Overview ==
Under the 1982 Statute of Autonomy, the Cortes of Aragon was the unicameral legislature of the homonymous autonomous community, having legislative power in devolved matters, as well as the ability to grant or withdraw confidence from a regional president. The electoral and procedural rules were supplemented by national law provisions.

=== Date ===
The term of the Cortes of Aragon expired four years after the date of its previous ordinary election, with amendments earlier in 1991 fixing election day for the fourth Sunday of May every four years. The election decree was required to be issued between 54 and 60 days before the scheduled election date and published on the following day in the Official Gazette of Aragon (BOA). The previous election was held on 10 June 1987, setting the date for election day on the fourth Sunday of May four years later, which was 26 May 1991.

The Cortes of Aragon could not be dissolved before the expiration date of parliament, except in the event of an investiture process failing to elect a regional president within a two-month period from the Cortes's reconvening. In such a case, the chamber was to be automatically dissolved and a snap election called, with elected lawmakers serving the remainder of its original four-year term.

The election to the Cortes of Aragon was officially called on 2 April 1991 with the publication of the corresponding decree in the BOA, setting election day for 26 May.

=== Electoral system ===
Voting for the Cortes was based on universal suffrage, comprising all Spanish nationals over 18 years of age, registered in Aragon and with full political rights, provided that they had not been deprived of the right to vote by a final sentence, nor were legally incapacitated.

The Cortes of Aragon had a minimum of 60 and a maximum of 75 seats, with electoral provisions fixing its size at 67. All were elected in three multi-member constituencies—corresponding to the provinces of Huesca, Teruel and Zaragoza, each of which was assigned an initial minimum of 13 seats and the remaining 28 distributed in proportion to population (with the seat-to-population ratio in the most populated province not exceeding 2.75 times that of the least populated one)—using the D'Hondt method and closed-list proportional voting, with a three percent-threshold of valid votes (including blank ballots) in each constituency. The use of this electoral method resulted in a higher effective threshold depending on district magnitude and vote distribution.

As a result of the aforementioned allocation, each Cortes constituency was entitled the following seats:

| Seats | Constituencies |
|---|---|
| 33 | Zaragoza |
| 18 | Huesca |
| 16 | Teruel |

The law did not provide for by-elections to fill vacant seats; instead, any vacancies arising after the proclamation of candidates and during the legislative term were filled by the next candidates on the party lists or, when required, by designated substitutes.

== Parties and candidates ==
The electoral law allowed for parties and federations registered in the interior ministry, alliances and groupings of electors to present lists of candidates. Parties and federations intending to form an alliance were required to inform the relevant electoral commission within 10 days of the election call, whereas groupings of electors needed to secure the signature of at least one percent of the electorate in the constituencies for which they sought election, disallowing electors from signing for more than one list.

Below is a list of the main parties and alliances which contested the election:

| Candidacy | Parties and alliances | Leading candidate | Ideology | Previous result | | Gov. | Ref. |
| Candidacy | Parties and alliances | Leading candidate | Ideology | Vote % | Seats | Gov. | Ref. |
|---|---|---|---|---|---|---|---|
| PSOE | List: Spanish Socialist Workers' Party (PSOE) | José Marco | Social democracy | 35.7% | 27 | No | |
| PAR | List: Aragonese Party (PAR) | Hipólito Gómez de las Roces | Regionalism; Centrism | 28.1% | 19 | Yes | |
| PP | List: People's Party (PP) | José Ignacio Senao | Conservatism; Christian democracy | 16.72% | 13 | Yes | |
| CDS | List: Democratic and Social Centre (CDS) | José Luis Merino | Centrism; Liberalism | 10.2% | 6 | No | |
| CAA–IU | List: Communist Party of Aragon (PCE–A); Socialist Action Party (PASOC); Republican Left (IR) | Adolfo Burriel | Socialism; Communism | 4.9% | 2 | No | |

== Opinion polls ==
The tables below list opinion polling results in reverse chronological order, showing the most recent first and using the dates when the survey fieldwork was done, as opposed to the date of publication. Where the fieldwork dates are unknown, the date of publication is given instead. The highest percentage figure in each polling survey is displayed with its background shaded in the leading party's colour. If a tie ensues, this is applied to the figures with the highest percentages. The "Lead" column on the right shows the percentage-point difference between the parties with the highest percentages in a poll.

=== Voting intention estimates ===
The table below lists weighted voting intention estimates. Refusals are generally excluded from the party vote percentages, while question wording and the treatment of "don't know" responses and those not intending to vote may vary between polling organisations. When available, seat projections determined by the polling organisations are displayed below (or in place of) the percentages in a smaller font; 34 seats were required for an absolute majority in the Cortes of Aragon.

| Polling firm/Commissioner | Fieldwork date | Sample size | Turnout | PSOE | PAR | AP | CDS | CAA–IU | PDP | PP | ARM | Lead |
|---|---|---|---|---|---|---|---|---|---|---|---|---|
| 1991 regional election | 26 May 1991 | —N/a | 64.3 | 40.3; 30 | 24.7; 17 | (Note: Within PP.) | 3.1; 0 | 6.7; 3 | | 20.7; 17 | – | 15.6 |
| EM&C/Heraldo de Aragón | 20 May 1991 | ? | ? | ? 29/31 | ? 19/21 | | ? 0/1 | ? 6/7 | | ? 10 | – | ? |
| El Periódico | 20 May 1991 | ? | ? | ? 23/25 | ? 18/19 | | ? 2/3 | ? 5/6 | | ? 16/17 | – | ? |
| ICP–Research/Diario 16 | 19 May 1991 | ? | ? | ? 27/29 | ? 17/19 | | ? 2 | ? 3/4 | | ? 16/19 | – | ? |
| Sigma Dos/El Mundo | 18 May 1991 | ? | ? | 34.8; 24/26 | 26.3; 18/20 | | 4.8; 2/3 | 9.6; 5/6 | | 21.1; 14/15 | – | 8.5 |
| Metra Seis/El Independiente | 12 May 1991 | ? | ? | 34.6; 25/26 | 28.1; 19/20 | | 6.1; 4 | 7.5; 2/4 | | 18.2; 13/14 | – | 6.5 |
| Demoscopia/El País | 4–7 May 1991 | 700 | ? | 34.6; 26 | 34.1; 22/23 | | 3.9; 0 | 8.3; 3 | | 16.4; 15/16 | – | 0.5 |
| 1989 general election | 29 Oct 1989 | —N/a | 70.2 | 38.7 (30) | 10.9 (7) | | 7.6 (4) | 9.7 (5) | | 27.8 (21) | 1.0 (0) | 10.9 |
| 1989 EP election | 15 Jun 1989 | —N/a | 54.3 | 41.6 (34) | – | | 7.8 (6) | 6.3 (3) | | 26.6 (22) | 5.5 (2) | 15.0 |
| 1987 regional election | 10 Jun 1987 | —N/a | 69.7 | 35.7; 27 | 28.1; 19 | 15.5; 13 | 10.2; 6 | 4.9; 2 | 1.2; 0 | – | – | 7.6 |

=== Voting preferences ===
The table below lists raw, unweighted voting preferences.

| Polling firm/Commissioner | Fieldwork date | Sample size | PSOE | PAR | AP | CDS | CAA–IU | PDP | PP | ARM | Question | X mark | Lead |
|---|---|---|---|---|---|---|---|---|---|---|---|---|---|
| 1991 regional election (Note: Does not include non-resident citizens.) | 26 May 1991 | —N/a | 25.7 | 15.7 | | 2.0 | 4.3 | | 13.2 | – | —N/a | 35.5 | 10.0 |
| ICP–Research/Diario 16 | 19 May 1991 | ? | 36.1 | 19.0 | | 3.6 | 5.2 | | 18.9 | – | – | – | 17.1 |
| CIS | 13–25 Mar 1991 | 1,553 | 26.0 | 14.0 | | 2.0 | 6.0 | | 11.0 | – | 33.0 | 6.0 | 12.0 |
| CIS | 3–18 Feb 1991 | 1,990 | 23.2 | 17.5 | | 1.3 | 4.2 | | 10.9 | – | 32.3 | 9.6 | 5.7 |
| 1989 general election | 29 Oct 1989 | —N/a | 27.0 | 7.6 | | 5.3 | 6.8 | | 19.4 | 0.7 | —N/a | 29.7 | 7.6 |
| 1989 EP election | 15 Jun 1989 | —N/a | 22.3 | – | | 4.2 | 3.4 | | 14.3 | 3.0 | —N/a | 45.7 | 8.0 |
| CIS | 16–27 Nov 1988 | 1,595 | 17.9 | 16.7 | 8.6 | 3.8 | 3.4 | 0.0 | – | – | 39.1 | 10.3 | 1.2 |
| 1987 regional election | 10 Jun 1987 | —N/a | 24.6 | 19.4 | 10.7 | 7.0 | 3.4 | 0.8 | – | – | —N/a | 30.3 | 5.2 |

=== Victory preferences ===
The table below lists opinion polling on the victory preferences for each party in the event of a regional election taking place.

| Polling firm/Commissioner | Fieldwork date | Sample size | PSOE | PAR | CDS | CAA–IU | PP | Other/ None | Question | Lead |
|---|---|---|---|---|---|---|---|---|---|---|
| CIS | 13–25 Mar 1991 | 1,553 | 31.0 | 19.0 | 2.0 | 7.0 | 14.0 | 9.0 | 18.0 | 12.0 |

== Results ==
=== Overall ===
← Summary of the 26 May 1991 Cortes of Aragon election results →
| Parties and alliances | Popular vote | | | Seats | |
| Parties and alliances | Votes | % | ±pp | Total | +/− |
|---|---|---|---|---|---|
| Spanish Socialist Workers' Party (PSOE) | 247,485 | 40.34 | +4.66 | 30 | +3 |
| Aragonese Party (PAR) | 151,420 | 24.68 | −3.46 | 17 | −2 |
| People's Party (PP)^{1} | 126,892 | 20.68 | +3.96 | 17 | +4 |
| Aragon Alternative Convergence–United Left (CAA–IU) | 41,367 | 6.74 | +1.84 | 3 | +1 |
| Democratic and Social Centre (CDS) | 18,929 | 3.09 | −7.14 | 0 | −6 |
| Aragonese Union (CHA) | 14,116 | 2.30 | +1.34 | 0 | ±0 |
| Workers' Socialist Party (PST) | 2,441 | 0.40 | New | 0 | ±0 |
| Independent Aragonese Party (PAI) | 1,882 | 0.31 | New | 0 | ±0 |
| Social Aragonese Movement (MAS) | 1,032 | 0.17 | New | 0 | ±0 |
| Blank ballots | 7,981 | 1.30 | −0.14 | | |
| Total | 613,545 | | | 67 | ±0 |
| Valid votes | 613,545 | 99.30 | +0.50 | | |
| Invalid votes | 4,303 | 0.70 | −0.50 | | |
| Votes cast / turnout | 617,848 | 64.39 | −5.31 | | |
| Abstentions | 341,748 | 35.61 | +5.31 | | |
| Registered voters | 959,596 | | | | |
Sources
Footnotes: ^{1} People's Party results are compared to the combined totals of People's Alliance and People's Democratic Party–Centrists of Aragon in the 1987 election.

Popular vote
| PSOE | 40.34% |
| PAR | 24.68% |
| PP | 20.68% |
| CAA–IU | 6.74% |
| CDS | 3.09% |
| CHA | 2.30% |
| Others | 0.87% |
| Blank ballots | 1.30% |

Seats
| PSOE | 44.78% |
| PAR | 25.37% |
| PP | 25.37% |
| CAA–IU | 4.48% |

=== Distribution by constituency ===
| Constituency | PSOE | | PAR | | PP | | CAA–IU | |
| Constituency | % | S | % | S | % | S | % | S |
|---|---|---|---|---|---|---|---|---|
| Huesca | 39.4 | 8 | 25.3 | 5 | 20.3 | 4 | 6.6 | 1 |
| Teruel | 37.9 | 7 | 19.7 | 3 | 31.3 | 6 | 3.0 | − |
| Zaragoza | 41.1 | 15 | 25.5 | 9 | 18.7 | 7 | 7.5 | 2 |
| Total | 40.3 | 30 | 24.7 | 17 | 20.7 | 17 | 6.7 | 3 |

== Aftermath ==
=== Government formation ===
Investiture; Nomination of Emilio Eiroa (PAR)
| Ballot → | 10 July 1991 |
| Required majority → | 34 out of 67 |
| Yes: • PAR (17); • PP (17) | 34 / 67 |
| No: • PSOE (30); • CAA–IU (3) | 33 / 67 |
| Abstentions | 0 / 67 |
| Absentees | 0 / 67 |

=== 1993 motion of no confidence ===
Motion of no confidence Nomination of José Marco (PSOE)
| Ballot → | 15 September 1993 |
| Required majority → | 34 out of 67 |
| Yes: • PSOE (30); • CAA–IU (3); • Independent (1) | 34 / 67 |
| No: • PAR (17); • PP (16) | 33 / 67 |
| Abstentions | 0 / 67 |
| Absentees | 0 / 67 |

=== 1994 motion of no confidence ===
Motion of no confidence Nomination of Emilio Eiroa (PAR)
| Ballot → | 21 December 1994 |
| Required majority → | 34 out of 67 |
| Yes: • PAR (16); • PP (16) | 32 / 67 |
| No: • PSOE (30) | 30 / 67 |
| Abstentions: • CAA–IU (3); • Independent (1) | 4 / 67 |
| Absentees: • PAR (1) | 1 / 67 |

=== Failed 1995 investiture ===
Investiture; Nomination of Ángela Abós (PSOE)
| Ballot → | 30 January 1995 | 31 January 1995 |
| Required majority → | 34 out of 67 | Simple |
| Yes: • PSOE (30); • Independent (1) | 31 / 67 | 31 / 67 |
| No: • PAR (17); • PP (16) | 33 / 67 | 33 / 67 |
| Abstentions: • CAA–IU (3) | 3 / 67 | 3 / 67 |
| Absentees | 0 / 67 | 0 / 67 |

== Bibliography ==
- Ley Orgánica 8/1982, de 10 de agosto, de Estatuto de Autonomía de Aragón (Organic Law 8/1982). Official State Gazette (in Spanish). 10 August 1982. BOE-A-1982-20819.
- Ley Orgánica 5/1985, de 19 de junio, del Régimen Electoral General (Organic Law 5/1985). Official State Gazette (in Spanish). 19 June 1985 [version as of 14 March 1991]. BOE-A-1985-11672.
- Ley 2/1987, de 16 de febrero, Electoral de la Comunidad Autónoma de Aragón (Law 2/1987). Official State Gazette (in Spanish). 16 February 1987 [version as of 27 March 1991]. BOE-A-1987-5339.
- Decreto de 1 de abril de 1991, de la Presidencia de la Diputación General de Aragón, por el que se convocan elecciones a las Cortes de Aragón (Decree). Official Gazette of Aragon (in Spanish). 1 April 1991.
