= 1987 Aragonese regional election =

Election in the Spanish region of Aragon

- 10 June 1987

All 67 seats in the Cortes of Aragon 34 seats needed for a majority
- Opinion polls
- Registered: 928,584 ▲1.0%
- Turnout: 647,257 (69.7%) ▲3.0 pp

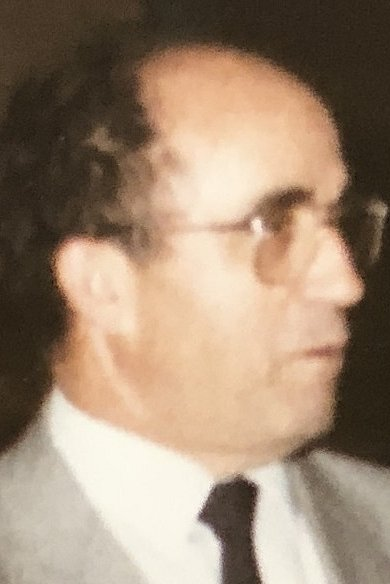

	First party	Second party	Third party
Leader	Santiago Marraco	Hipólito Gómez de las Roces	Ángel Cristóbal Montes
Party	PSOE	PAR	AP
Leader since	November 1979	December 1977	1987
Leader's seat	Zaragoza	Zaragoza	Zaragoza
Last election	33 seats, 46.8%	13 seats, 20.5%	13 seats (CP) (Note: Within the AP–PDP–UL alliance in the 1983 election: AP (13 seats) and PDP (5 seats).)
Seats won	27	19	13
Seat change	▼6	▲6	0
Popular vote	228,170	179,922	99,082
Percentage	35.7%	28.1%	15.5%
Swing	▼11.1 pp	▲7.6 pp	n/a
	Fourth party	Fifth party	Sixth party
Leader	José Luis Merino	Antonio de las Casas	Mariano Alierta
Party	CDS	CAA–IU	PDP
Leader since	1983	1987	1987
Leader's seat	Zaragoza	Zaragoza	Zaragoza (lost)
Last election	1 seat, 3.3%	1 seat, 4.0% (Note: Results for PCE in the 1983 election.)	5 seats (CP)
Seats won	6	2	0
Seat change	▲5	▲1	▼5
Popular vote	65,406	31,352	7,887
Percentage	10.2%	4.9%	1.2%
Swing	▲6.9 pp	▲0.9 pp	n/a
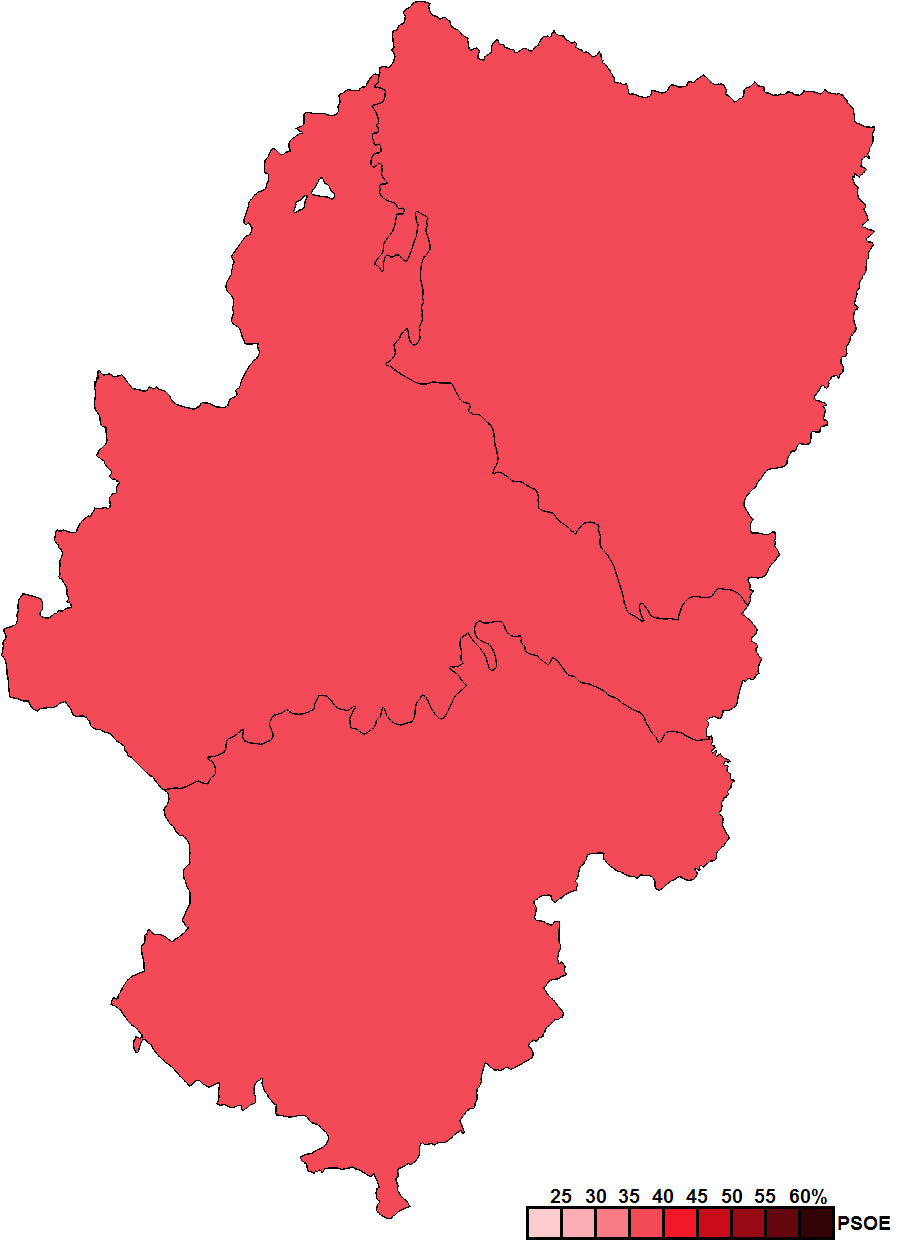
- Constituency results map for the Cortes of Aragon
President before election
Santiago Marraco
PSOE
President after election
Hipólito Gómez de las Roces
PAR

A regional election was held in Aragon on 10 June 1987 to elect the 2nd Cortes of the autonomous community. All 67 seats in the Cortes were up for election. It was held concurrently with regional elections in twelve other autonomous communities and local elections all across Spain, as well as the 1987 European Parliament election.

Affected by their national trends, the Spanish Socialist Workers' Party (PSOE) and the People's Alliance (AP) lost support compared to the previous election, falling from 46.8% and 22.6% to 35.7% and 15.5%, and from 33 and 18 seats to 27 and 13, respectively. The latter had suffered from an internal crisis and the breakup of the People's Coalition in 1986, losing 30% of its 1983 vote and finishing third as a result, with the Regionalist Aragonese Party (PAR) scoring a strong second place with 28.1% and 19 seats. The centrist Democratic and Social Centre (CDS), a party led by the former Spanish prime minister Adolfo Suarez, saw sizeable gains and achieved a kingmaker position with 10.2% and 6 seats. United Left (IU) made a small advance of 0.9 percentage points and 1 seat, but was not able to capitalize on the PSOE's losses.

The two main centre-right parties, the PAR and AP, were able to muster 32 seats in the Cortes compared to the PSOE's 27. As a result, PAR leader Hipólito Gómez de las Roces was elected as new president of Aragon, replacing Santiago Marraco at the helm of a minority administration with AP's support and the CDS's abstention. In March 1989, AP, now refounded as the People's Party (PP), entered the government and formed a coalition with the PAR for the remainder of the legislature.

== Overview ==
Under the 1982 Statute of Autonomy, the Cortes of Aragon was the unicameral legislature of the homonymous autonomous community, having legislative power in devolved matters, as well as the ability to grant or withdraw confidence from a regional president. The electoral and procedural rules were supplemented by national law provisions.

=== Date ===
The term of the Cortes of Aragon expired four years after the date of its previous ordinary election. The election decree was required to be issued no later than 25 days before the scheduled expiration date of parliament and published on the following day in the Official Gazette of Aragon (BOA), with election day taking place between 54 and 60 days after the decree's publication. The previous election was held on 8 May 1983, which meant that the chamber's term would have expired on 8 May 1987. The election decree was required to be published in the BOA no later than 14 April 1987, setting the latest possible date for election day on 13 June 1987.

The Cortes of Aragon could not be dissolved before the expiration date of parliament, except in the event of an investiture process failing to elect a regional president within a two-month period from the Cortes's reconvening. In such a case, the chamber was to be automatically dissolved and a snap election called, with elected lawmakers serving the remainder of its original four-year term.

The election to the Cortes of Aragon was officially called on 14 April 1987 with the publication of the corresponding decree in the BOA, setting election day for 10 June.

=== Electoral system ===
Voting for the Cortes was based on universal suffrage, comprising all Spanish nationals over 18 years of age, registered in Aragon and with full political rights, provided that they had not been deprived of the right to vote by a final sentence, nor were legally incapacitated.

The Cortes of Aragon had a minimum of 60 and a maximum of 75 seats, with electoral provisions fixing its size at 67. All were elected in three multi-member constituencies—corresponding to the provinces of Huesca, Teruel and Zaragoza, each of which was assigned an initial minimum of 13 seats and the remaining 28 distributed in proportion to population (with the seat-to-population ratio in the most populated province not exceeding 2.75 times that of the least populated one)—using the D'Hondt method and closed-list proportional voting, with a three percent-threshold of valid votes (including blank ballots) in each constituency. The use of this electoral method resulted in a higher effective threshold depending on district magnitude and vote distribution.

As a result of the aforementioned allocation, each Cortes constituency was entitled the following seats:

Seats	Constituencies
33	Zaragoza^{(+1)}
18	Huesca
16	Teruel

The law did not provide for by-elections to fill vacant seats; instead, any vacancies arising after the proclamation of candidates and during the legislative term were filled by the next candidates on the party lists or, when required, by designated substitutes.

== Parties and candidates ==
The electoral law allowed for parties and federations registered in the interior ministry, alliances and groupings of electors to present lists of candidates. Parties and federations intending to form an alliance were required to inform the relevant electoral commission within 10 days of the election call, whereas groupings of electors needed to secure the signature of at least one percent of the electorate in the constituencies for which they sought election, disallowing electors from signing for more than one list.

Below is a list of the main parties and alliances which contested the election:

Candidacy	Parties and alliances	Leading candidate	Ideology	Previous result		Gov.	Ref.
Candidacy	Parties and alliances	Leading candidate	Ideology	Vote %	Seats	Gov.	Ref.
PSOE	List: Spanish Socialist Workers' Party (PSOE)	Santiago Marraco	Social democracy	46.8%	33	Yes	
AP	List: People's Alliance (AP)	Ángel Cristóbal Montes	Conservatism; National conservatism	22.6%	18	No	
PDP	List: People's Democratic Party (PDP)	Mariano Alierta	Christian democracy	22.6%	18	No	
PAR	List: Aragonese Party (PAR)	Hipólito Gómez de las Roces	Regionalism; Centrism	20.5%	13	No	
CAA–IU	List: Communist Party of Aragon (PCE–A); Socialist Action Party (PASOC); Communist Party of the Peoples of Spain (PCPE); Progressive Federation (FP); Republican Left (IR)	Antonio de las Casas	Socialism; Communism	4.0%	1	No	
CDS	List: Democratic and Social Centre (CDS)	José Luis Merino	Centrism; Liberalism	3.3%	1	No	

== Opinion polls ==
The tables below list opinion polling results in reverse chronological order, showing the most recent first and using the dates when the survey fieldwork was done, as opposed to the date of publication. Where the fieldwork dates are unknown, the date of publication is given instead. The highest percentage figure in each polling survey is displayed with its background shaded in the leading party's colour. If a tie ensues, this is applied to the figures with the highest percentages. The "Lead" column on the right shows the percentage-point difference between the parties with the highest percentages in a poll.

=== Voting intention estimates ===
The table below lists weighted voting intention estimates. Refusals are generally excluded from the party vote percentages, while question wording and the treatment of "don't know" responses and those not intending to vote may vary between polling organisations. When available, seat projections determined by the polling organisations are displayed below (or in place of) the percentages in a smaller font; 34 seats were required for an absolute majority in the Cortes of Aragon.

Polling firm/Commissioner	Fieldwork date	Sample size	Turnout	PSOE	AP–PDP–PL	PAR	CAA–IU	CDS	AP	PDP	Lead
1987 regional election	10 Jun 1987	—N/a	69.7	35.7; 27	–	28.1; 19	4.9; 2	10.2; 6	15.5; 13	1.2; 0	7.6
Demoscopia/El País	22–26 May 1987	?	64	28.5; 18/19	–	32.7; 25/26	4.7; 2	11.7; 7	15.5; 14	1.9; 0	4.2
1986 general election	22 Jun 1986	—N/a	70.6	43.4 (31)	26.1 (20)	11.0 (7)	3.4 (1)	11.2 (7)	(Note: Within CP.)		17.3
1983 regional election	8 May 1983	—N/a	66.7	46.8; 33	22.6; 18	20.5; 13	4.0; 1	3.3; 1			24.2

=== Voting preferences ===
The table below lists raw, unweighted voting preferences.

Polling firm/Commissioner	Fieldwork date	Sample size	PSOE	AP–PDP–PL	PAR	CAA–IU	CDS	AP	PDP	Question	X mark	Lead
1987 regional election (Note: Does not include non-resident citizens.)	10 Jun 1987	—N/a	24.6	–	19.4	3.4	7.0	10.7	0.8	—N/a	30.3	5.2
CIS	2–5 Jun 1987	1,601	22.1	–	15.5	3.4	8.0	9.2	0.2	33.8	5.8	6.6
CIS	8–16 May 1987	2,408	25.7	–	9.8	2.3	4.8	7.1	0.1	42.6	6.2	15.9
CIS	14–23 Apr 1987	2,399	26.0	–	9.0	2.0	5.0	9.0	0.0	39.0	7.0	17.0
CIS	14–23 Mar 1987	1,899	28.0	–	11.0	4.0	5.0	6.0	0.0	40.0	6.0	17.0
CIS	1 Dec 1986	1,596	31.5	–	12.0	2.8	5.3	7.6	0.2	29.9	9.0	19.5
1986 general election	22 Jun 1986	—N/a	30.1	18.2	7.7	2.3	7.8			—N/a	29.1	11.9
CIS	1–16 Jun 1986	1,500	29.9	5.2	17.5	2.2	5.1			29.6	6.7	12.4
CIS	31 Jan–14 Feb 1986	1,500	32.9	25.8		2.5	3.1			27.8	6.3	7.1
CIS	31 Jan–14 Feb 1986	1,500	27.2	12.1	9.5	2.2	1.9			38.4	7.5	15.1
CIS	1 Oct 1985	1,920	31.3	7.0	6.5	2.3	2.8			38.4	8.2	24.3
CIS	1 Feb 1985	1,497	30.9	12.6	9.1	2.0	2.4			28.4	10.2	18.3
1983 regional election	8 May 1983	—N/a	30.8	14.9	13.5	2.6	2.2			—N/a	33.3	15.9

=== Victory preferences ===
The table below lists opinion polling on the victory preferences for each party in the event of a regional election taking place.

Polling firm/Commissioner	Fieldwork date	Sample size	PSOE	PAR	CAA–IU	CDS	AP	PDP	Other/ None	Question	Lead
CIS	2–5 Jun 1987	1,601	28.3	19.4	4.1	10.3	11.1	0.2	2.4	24.3	8.9
CIS	8–16 May 1987	2,408	34.6	13.0	2.9	7.1	9.1	0.1	1.1	32.1	21.6
CIS	14–23 Apr 1987	2,399	31.0	13.0	3.0	7.0	10.0	0.0	1.0	34.0	18.0
CIS	14–23 Mar 1987	1,899	32.0	14.0	4.0	8.0	8.0	0.0	1.0	33.0	18.0

=== Victory likelihood ===
The table below lists opinion polling on the perceived likelihood of victory for each party in the event of a regional election taking place.

Polling firm/Commissioner	Fieldwork date	Sample size	PSOE	PAR	CAA–IU	CDS	AP	PDP	Other/ None	Question	Lead
CIS	2–5 Jun 1987	1,601	45.9	5.8	0.1	2.8	3.0	0.0	0.0	42.3	40.1
CIS	8–16 May 1987	2,408	51.4	2.6	0.5	1.2	2.9	0.1	0.1	41.2	48.5
CIS	14–23 Apr 1987	2,399	48.0	4.0	0.0	2.0	4.0	0.0	0.0	42.0	44.0
CIS	14–23 Mar 1987	1,899	49.0	3.0	0.0	2.0	2.0	0.0	0.0	43.0	46.0

=== Preferred President ===
The table below lists opinion polling on leader preferences to become president of the Government of Aragon.

Polling firm/Commissioner	Fieldwork date	Sample size											Other/ None/ Not care	Question	Lead
Polling firm/Commissioner	Fieldwork date	Sample size	Marraco PSOE	Alegre PSOE	Zapatero AP	Furriel AP	Cristóbal AP	Roces PAR	Bolea PAR	Casas IU	Merino CDS	Alierta PDP	Other/ None/ Not care	Question	Lead
CIS	2–5 Jun 1987	1,601	23.8	–	–	–	3.4	18.3	–	3.0	5.6	1.5	13.1	31.3	5.5
CIS	8–16 May 1987	2,408	29.4	–	–	–	0.9	11.9	–	2.2	2.6	1.1	19.0	33.1	17.5
CIS	14–23 Apr 1987	2,399	26.0	–	–	1.0	–	14.0	–	2.0	3.0	2.0	20.0	32.0	12.0
CIS	14–23 Mar 1987	1,899	24.0	1.0	1.0	–	–	13.0	4.0	2.0	1.0	–	24.0	29.0	11.0
CIS	1 Dec 1986	1,596	34.2	–	–	1.0	–	10.9	–	1.3	1.3	–	13.7	37.6	23.3

== Results ==
=== Overall ===
← Summary of the 10 June 1987 Cortes of Aragon election results →
Parties and alliances	Popular vote			Seats	
Parties and alliances	Votes	%	±pp	Total	+/−
Spanish Socialist Workers' Party (PSOE)	228,170	35.68	−11.15	27	−6
Regionalist Aragonese Party (PAR)	179,922	28.14	+7.63	19	+6
People's Alliance (AP)^{1}	99,082	15.49	n/a	13	±0
Democratic and Social Centre (CDS)	65,406	10.23	+6.94	6	+5
Aragon Alternative Convergence–United Left (CAA–IU)^{2}	31,352	4.90	+0.94	2	+1
Workers' Party of Spain–Communist Unity (PTE–UC)	8,435	1.32	New	0	±0
People's Democratic Party–Centrists of Aragon (PDP)^{1}	7,887	1.23	n/a	0	−5
Aragonese Union (UA/CHA)	6,154	0.96	New	0	±0
Humanist Platform (PH)	2,439	0.38	New	0	±0
Republican Popular Unity (UPR)	1,435	0.22	New	0	±0
Blank ballots	9,186	1.44	+0.79		
Total	639,468			67	+1
Valid votes	639,468	98.80	+0.22		
Invalid votes	7,789	1.20	−0.22		
Votes cast / turnout	647,257	69.70	+2.96		
Abstentions	281,327	30.30	−2.96		
Registered voters	928,584				
Sources
Footnotes: ^{1} Within the People's Coalition alliance in the 1983 election.; ^{2} Aragon Alternative Convergence–United Left results are compared to Communist Party of Spain totals in the 1983 election.

Popular vote
PSOE	35.68%
PAR	28.14%
AP	15.49%
CDS	10.23%
CAA–IU	4.90%
PTE–UC	1.32%
PDP	1.23%
Others	1.57%
Blank ballots	1.44%

Seats
PSOE	40.30%
PAR	28.36%
AP	19.40%
CDS	8.96%
CAA–IU	2.99%

=== Distribution by constituency ===
Constituency	PSOE		PAR		AP		CDS		CAA–IU	
Constituency	%	S	%	S	%	S	%	S	%	S
Huesca	36.1	7	25.2	5	15.2	3	11.9	2	5.2	1
Teruel	35.8	7	17.7	3	27.3	5	10.2	1	2.9	−
Zaragoza	35.5	13	30.9	11	13.3	5	9.8	3	5.2	1
Total	35.7	27	28.1	19	15.5	13	10.2	6	4.9	2

== Aftermath ==
=== Government formation ===
Investiture; Nomination of Hipólito Gómez de las Roces (PAR)
Ballot →	21 July 1987	23 July 1987
Required majority →	34 out of 67	Simple
Yes: • PAR (19); • AP (13)	32 / 67	32 / 67
No: • PSOE (27); • CAA–IU (2)	29 / 67	29 / 67
Abstentions: • CDS (6)	6 / 67	6 / 67
Absentees	0 / 67	0 / 67

== Bibliography ==
- Ley Orgánica 8/1982, de 10 de agosto, de Estatuto de Autonomía de Aragón (Organic Law 8/1982). Official State Gazette (in Spanish). 10 August 1982. BOE-A-1982-20819.
- Ley Orgánica 5/1985, de 19 de junio, del Régimen Electoral General (Organic Law 5/1985). Official State Gazette (in Spanish). 19 June 1985 [version as of 3 April 1987]. BOE-A-1985-11672.
- Ley 2/1987, de 16 de febrero, Electoral de la Comunidad Autónoma de Aragón (Law 2/1987). Official State Gazette (in Spanish). 16 February 1987 [version as of 18 February 1987]. BOE-A-1987-5339.
- Decreto de 13 de abril de 1987, de la Presidencia de la Diputación General de Aragón, por el que se convocan elecciones a las Cortes de Aragón (Decree). Official Gazette of Aragon (in Spanish). 1 April 1991.
