= Gaspar Castellano =

Spanish politician (1928–2019)

President of the Government of Aragon
- In office 9 May 1981 – 26 November 1982
- Monarch: Juan Carlos I
- Preceded by: José Ángel Biel (acting)
- Succeeded by: José María Hernández de la Torre (acting)

Personal details
- Born: Gaspar Castellano y de Gastón; 18 May 1928 Ejea de los Caballeros, Spain
- Died: 21 April 2019 (aged 90)
- Party: UCD

Gaspar Castellano y de Gastón (18 May 1928 – 21 April 2019) was a Spanish politician who belonged to the Union of the Democratic Centre (UCD) and who served as President of the Government of Aragon, one of the Spanish regional administrations, from 1981 to 1982.
