= Santiago Lanzuela =

Spanish economist and politician (1948–2020)

Santiago Lanzuela Marina
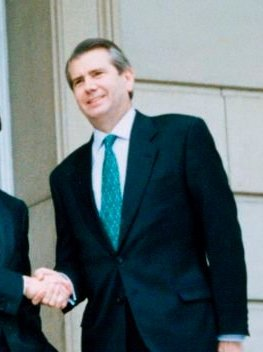
- Lanzuela in 1996

President of the Government of Aragon
- In office 2 July 1995 – 2 August 1999
- Preceded by: Ramón Tejedor
- Succeeded by: Marcelino Iglesias

Minister of Economics and Housing for the Government of Aragon
- In office 13 March 1989 – 17 September 1993
- President: Hipólito Gómez de las Roces; Emilio Eiroa
- Preceded by: Antonio Laguarta
- Succeeded by: Eugenio Nadal

Member of the Congress of Deputies for Teruel
- In office 12 March 2000 – 28 July 2014

Member of the Aragonese Corts for Zaragoza
- In office 28 May 1991 – 27 March 2000

Personal details
- Born: 27 September 1948 Teruel, Spain
- Died: 16 April 2020 (aged 71) Madrid, Spain
- Party: People's Party of Aragon; People's Party
- Education: University of Valencia
- Profession: Economist; Politician

Santiago Lanzuela Marina (27 September 1948 – 16 April 2020) was a Spanish economist and politician for the People's Party (PP), who served as President of the Government of Aragon, one of the Spanish regional administrations.

== Life ==
Lanzuela was born in Teruel, Spain. An economist by profession, he was married with two children. In 1974 he became head of the office for Spanish co-operation with Nicaragua and then served as a director in the Spanish Employment Ministry from 1976 to 1981. In 1987, he was elected to the Aragonese Regional Assembly and, in 1989, the PP entered a coalition government with the Aragonese Party (PAR) with Lanzuela serving as Economics Minister until 1993.

On 28 May 1995, the PP received the most votes in the Aragonese regional elections and as lead PP candidate, he was elected President of Aragon, defeating Ángela Abós Ballarín of the Spanish Socialist Workers' Party (PSOE).

Although the PP increased their number of votes and seats in the 1999 elections, the PAR instead backed the candidate of the rival PSOE for President. At the 2000 General Election he was elected to the Spanish Congress, representing Teruel constituency and was re-elected at the subsequent elections in 2004 and 2008.

== Death ==
Santiago Lanzuela died, aged 71, from COVID-19-related causes on 16 April 2020, in Madrid.
