= José Marco (politician) =

Spanish politician

President of the Government of Aragon
- In office 17 September 1993 – 17 January 1995
- Monarch: Juan Carlos I
- Preceded by: Emilio Eiroa
- Succeeded by: Ramón Tejedor (acting)

Personal details
- Born: José Marco Berges; 10 January 1950 (age 76) Pedrola, Spain
- Party: PSOE

José Marco Berges (born Pedrola, Spain, 10 January 1950) is a Spanish politician who belongs to the Spanish Socialist Workers' Party (PSOE) and who previously served as President of the Government of Aragon, one of the Spanish regional administrations, from 1993 to 1995.

In 1995, Marco supported Ángela Abós Ballarín as his successor, and he made a speech in support of her to the Cortes of Aragon. However, Ballarín was ultimately defeated by Santiago Lanzuela.
