= People's Party of Aragon =

People's Party of Aragon Partido Popular de Aragón
- President: Jorge Azcón
- Secretary-General: Ana Alós
- Founded: 1989
- Headquarters: Paseo de la Gran Vía nº 9 Zaragoza, Aragon
- Ideology: Christian democracy Conservatism; Liberal conservatism
- Political position: Centre-right to right-wing
- National affiliation: People's Party
- Cortes of Aragon: 28 / 67
- Congress of Deputies: 7 / 13 (Aragonese seats)
- Senate: 9 / 14 (Aragonese seats)

Website
- www.pparagon.es

The People's Party of Aragon (Spanish: Partido Popular de Aragón, PP) is the regional section of the People's Party of Spain (PP) in Aragon. It was formed in 1989 from the re-foundation of the People's Alliance.

== Electoral performance ==
=== Cortes of Aragon ===
Cortes of Aragon
Election	Leading candidate	Votes	%	Seats	Gov.
1991	José Ignacio Senao	126,892	20.7 (#2)	17 / 67	Yes (Note: 1991–1993.)
1991	José Ignacio Senao	126,892	20.7 (#2)	17 / 67	No (Note: 1993–1995.)
1995	Santiago Lanzuela	263,524	37.5 (#1)	27 / 67	Yes
1999	Santiago Lanzuela	249,458	38.2 (#1)	28 / 67	No
2003	Gustavo Alcalde	219,058	30.7 (#2)	22 / 67	No
2007	Gustavo Alcalde	208,642	31.1 (#2)	23 / 67	No
2011	Luisa Fernanda Rudi	269,729	39.7 (#1)	30 / 67	Yes
2015	Luisa Fernanda Rudi	183,654	27.5 (#1)	21 / 67	No
2019	Luis María Beamonte	139,660	20.9 (#2)	16 / 67	No
2023	Jorge Azcón	237,817	35.5 (#1)	28 / 67	Yes
2026	Jorge Azcón	228,388	34.2 (#1)	26 / 67	Yes

=== Cortes Generales ===
Cortes Generales
Election	Aragon						
Election	Congress					Senate	
Election	Vote	%	Score	Seats	+/–	Seats	+/–
1989	183,361	27.81%	2nd	4 / 13	0 (Note: Compared to People's Coalition totals in the 1986 general election.)	3 / 12	0
1993	250,105	32.88%	2nd	4 / 13	0	3 / 12	0
1996 (Note: Electoral alliance with the Aragonese Party.)	370,975	47.92%	1st	8 / 13	4	9 / 12	6
2000	341,396	47.23%	1st	8 / 13	0	9 / 12	0
2004	284,893	36.48%	2nd	5 / 13	3	4 / 12	5
2008	284,068	37.01%	2nd	5 / 13	0	3 / 12	1
2011	339,502	47.70%	1st	8 / 13	3	9 / 12	6
2015	229,691	31.31%	1st	6 / 13	2	9 / 12	0
2016	252,456	35.81%	1st	6 / 13	0	9 / 12	0
Apr-2019	143,242	18.90%	3rd	3 / 13	3	2 / 12	7
Nov-2019	167,233	23.86%	2nd	4 / 13	1	5 / 12	3
2023	259,145	36.27%	1st	7 / 13	3	9 / 12	4

=== European Parliament ===
European Parliament
Election	Aragon		
Election	Vote	%	Score
1989	133,858	26.62%	2nd
1994	257,637	44.90%	1st
1999	275,844	42.48%	1st
2004	192,406	39.96%	2nd
2009	196,056	41.69%	2nd
2014	128,252	27.87%	1st
2019	143,846	21.74%	2nd
2024	194,332	37.14%	1st

== See also ==
- People's Party
