= Ramón Tejedor =

Spanish politician

President of the Government of Aragon (acting)
- In office 17 January 1995 – 11 July 1995
- Monarch: Juan Carlos I
- Preceded by: José Marco
- Succeeded by: Santiago Lanzuela

Personal details
- Born: Ramón Aurelio Tejedor Sanz; 18 February 1955 (age 71) Zaragoza, Spain
- Party: PSOE

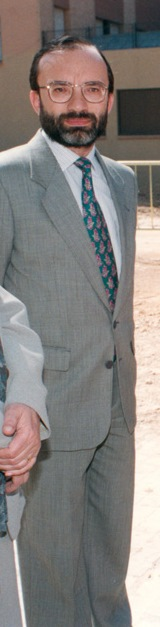
An image of Ramón Tejedor, 1995

Ramón Aurelio Tejedor Sanz (Zaragoza, Spain, 18 February 1955) is a Spanish politician who belongs to the Spanish Socialist Workers' Party (PSOE) and who previously served as acting President of the Government of Aragon in early 1995.
