= List of municipalities in Aragon =

The following list is of important municipalities in Aragon, an autonomous community of Spain:

== Provincial lists ==
The following links are to lists which are more detailed province-specific, and all municipalities in a given province are ranked by population.

- List of municipalities in Huesca
- List of municipalities in Taruel
- List of municipalities in Zaragoza

== Largest municipalities by population ==
Rank	Name	Population (2020)
1	Zaragoza	681,877
2	Huesca	53,956
3	Teruel	36,240
4	Calatayud	20,092
5	Utebo	18,822
6	Monzón	17,469
7	Barbastro	17,174
8	Ejea de los Caballeros	16,984
9	Alcañiz	16,006
10	Fraga	15,353
11	Cuarte de Huerva	13,450
12	Jaca	13,129
13	Tarazona	10,558
14	Caspe	10,026
15	Binéfar	9,742
16	Sabiñánigo	9,185
17	Zuera	8,576
18	La Almunia de Doña Godina	8,091
19	Andorra	7,345
20	Alagón	7,154
21	Tauste	6,847
22	La Puebla de Alfindén	6,358
23	María de Huerva	5,970
24	La Muela	5,894
25	Borja	4,978
26	Villanueva de Gállego	4,728
27	Fuentes de Ebro	4,549
28	Calamocha	4,429
29	Épila	4,372
30	Cadrete	4,235

== See also ==
- Comarcas of Aragon
