= Luisa Fernanda Rudi =

Spanish politician (born 1950)

Luisa Fernanda Rudi Úbeda
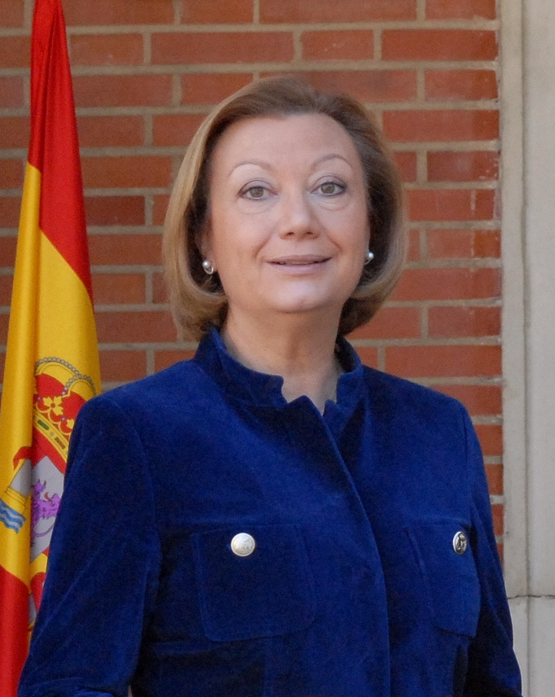

175th President of the Congress of Deputies
- In office 5 April 2000 – 8 April 2004
- Preceded by: Federico Trillo
- Succeeded by: Manuel Marín

President of the Government of Aragon
- In office 13 July 2011 – 3 July 2015
- Monarch: Felipe VI
- Preceded by: Marcelino Iglesias
- Succeeded by: Javier Lambán

Member of the Congress of Deputies
- In office 5 April 2000 – 2 July 2004
- Constituency: Zaragoza

Member of the European Parliament
- In office 20 July 2004 – 31 March 2008
- Constituency: Spain

Mayor of Zaragoza
- In office 17 June 1995 – 8 April 2000
- Preceded by: Antonio González Triviño
- Succeeded by: José Atarés

Senator of Spain
- Incumbent
- Assumed office 28 July 2015
- Constituency: Cortes of Aragon (2015–2023); Zaragoza (since 2023)

Personal details
- Born: 13 December 1950 (age 75) Seville, Spain
- Party: People's Party (since 1989)
- Other political affiliations: People's Alliance (until 1989)

Luisa Fernanda Rudi Úbeda (born 14 December 1950 in Seville) is a Spanish politician currently serving as Senator from Teruel in Aragón since 2015. She served as the 175th president of the Congress of Deputies, being the first woman to hold the position in Spanish history. From 2011 to 2015 she served as president of the Government of Aragon.

Rudi was born in Seville. In the Spanish parliament she represented Zaragoza from 1986–1996 and from 2000 to 2004. She was a substitute for Committee on Industry, Research and Energy, substitute for the Delegation to the EU-Mexico Joint Parliamentary Committee.

She was a member of the Bureau of the European People's Party and sat on the European Parliament's Committee on the Internal Market and Consumer Protection.

Between July 2011 and July 2015 she was President of the Government of Aragon. She became a is member of the Senate of Spain in 2015.

Political offices
Preceded by Federico Trillo	President of the Congress of Deputies; 2000–2004	Succeeded by Manuel Marín
Preceded by Marcelino Iglesias	President of the Government of Aragon; 2011–2015	Succeeded by Javier Lambán
