= Socialists' Party of Aragon =

Socialists' Party of Aragon Partido de los Socialistas de Aragón
- Secretary-General: Pilar Alegría
- Founded: 1978
- Headquarters: C/ Conde Aranda, 138; Zaragoza, Aragon
- Membership (2014): ▼7,953
- Ideology: Social democracy
- Political position: Centre-left
- National affiliation: Spanish Socialist Workers' Party
- Congress of Deputies: 4 / 13 (Aragonese seats)
- Spanish Senate: 3 / 14 (Aragonese seats)
- Cortes of Aragon: 18 / 67
- Local seats: 1,433 / 4,297

Website
- aragonpsoe.es

The Socialists' Party of Aragon (Aragonese: Partiu d'os Socialistas d'Aragón; Spanish: Partido de los Socialistas de Aragón, PSOE–Aragón) is the regional branch in Aragon of the Spanish Socialist Workers' Party (PSOE), main centre-left party in Spain since the 1970s.

== Electoral performance ==
=== Cortes of Aragon ===
Cortes of Aragon
Election	Leading candidate	Votes	%	Seats	Gov.
1983	Santiago Marraco	283,226	46.8 (#1)	33 / 66	Yes
1987	Santiago Marraco	228,170	35.7 (#1)	27 / 67	No
1991	José Marco	247,485	40.3 (#1)	30 / 67	No (Note: 1991–1993.)
1991	José Marco	247,485	40.3 (#1)	30 / 67	Yes (Note: 1993–1995.)
1995	Marcelino Iglesias	180,728	25.7 (#2)	19 / 67	No
1999	Marcelino Iglesias	201,117	30.8 (#2)	23 / 67	Yes
2003	Marcelino Iglesias	270,468	37.9 (#1)	27 / 67	Yes
2007	Marcelino Iglesias	276,415	41.1 (#1)	30 / 67	Yes
2011	Eva Almunia	197,189	29.0 (#2)	22 / 67	No
2015	Javier Lambán	143,096	21.4 (#2)	18 / 67	Yes
2019	Javier Lambán	206,400	30.8 (#1)	24 / 67	Yes
2023	Javier Lambán	197,919	29.6 (#2)	23 / 67	No
2026	Pilar Alegría	162,925	24.4 (#2)	18 / 67	TBD

=== Cortes Generales ===
Cortes Generales
Election	Aragon						
Election	Congress					Senate	
Election	Votes	%	#	Seats	+/–	Seats	+/–
1977	161,409	24.75%	2nd	5 / 14	—	2 / 12	—
1979	177,371	28.30%	2nd	5 / 14	0	3 / 12	1
1982	357,339	49.41%	1st	9 / 14	4	9 / 12	6
1986	287,809	43.43%	1st	8 / 14	1	9 / 12	0
1989	255,342	38.72%	1st	7 / 13	1	9 / 12	0
1993	261,108	34.33%	1st	7 / 13	0	9 / 12	0
1996	268,189	34.64%	2nd	5 / 13	2	3 / 12	6
2000	224,650	31.08%	2nd	4 / 13	1	3 / 12	0
2004	322,428	41.28%	1st	7 / 13	3	8 / 12	5
2008	356,050	46.39%	1st	8 / 13	1	9 / 12	1
2011	224,314	31.52%	2nd	4 / 13	4	3 / 12	6
2015	169,057	23.05%	2nd	4 / 13	0	3 / 12	0
2016	174,960	24.82%	2nd	4 / 13	0	3 / 12	0
2019 (Apr)	240,540	31.74%	1st	5 / 13	1	9 / 12	6
2019 (Nov)	215,361	30.72%	1st	6 / 13	1	6 / 12	3
2023	222,391	31.12%	2nd	4 / 13	2	3 / 12	3

=== European Parliament ===
European Parliament
Election	Aragon		
Election	Votes	%	#
1987	245,264	38.40%	1st
1989	209,358	41.64%	1st
1994	164,732	28.71%	2nd
1999	218,710	33.68%	2nd
2004	220,719	45.84%	1st
2009	206,713	43.96%	1st
2014	111,976	24.33%	2nd
2019	239,358	36.18%	1st
