= Valtorres =

Coordinates: 41°18′N 1°44′W

- municipality
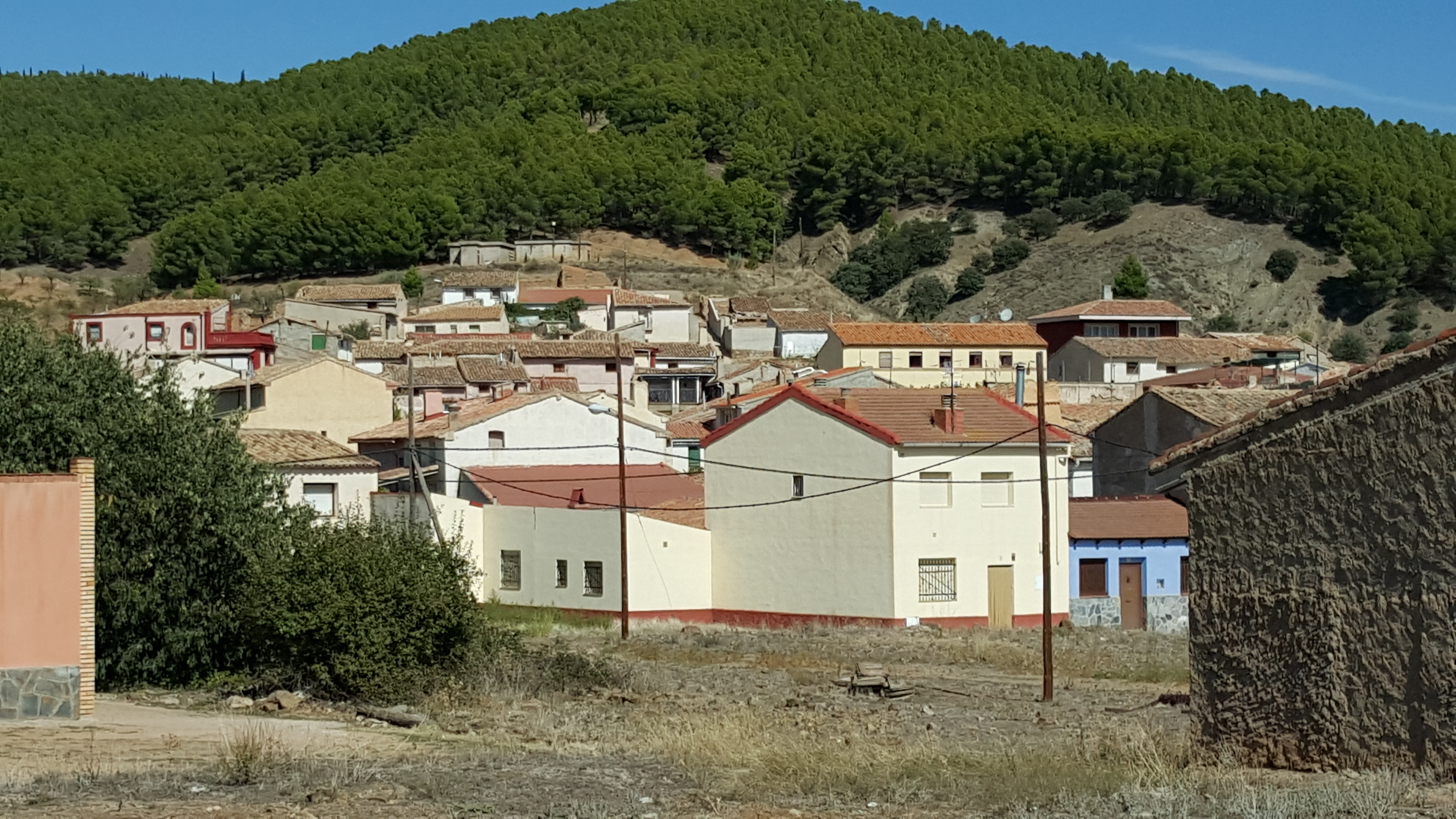
- View of Valtorres

- Flag Coat of arms
- Interactive map of Valtorres
- Country: Spain
- Autonomous community: Aragon
- Province: Zaragoza

Area
  - Total: 3 km^{2} (1.2 sq mi)

Population (2025-01-01)
  - Total: 65
  - Density: 22/km^{2} (56/sq mi)
- Time zone: UTC+1 (CET)
  - Summer (DST): UTC+2 (CEST)

Valtorres is a municipality located in the province of Zaragoza, Aragon, Spain. According to the 2004 census (INE), the municipality has a population of 109 inhabitants.

== See also ==
- List of municipalities in Zaragoza
