= Juan Antonio Bolea =

Spanish politician (1930–2021)

Juan Antonio Bolea

Juan Antonio Bolea Foradada (30 March 1930 – 27 February 2021) was a Spanish politician who served as a Deputy and the first president of Aragón, playing a key role in the Spanish transition to democracy in that region.
