= Aragonese Party =

Regionalist political party in Spain

Aragonese Party Partido Aragonés
- President: Clemente Sánchez-Garnica
- Founders: Hipólito Gómez de las Roces; Emilio Eiroa
- Founded: January 1978
- Preceded by: Centre Independent Aragonese Candidacy
- Headquarters: Calle Coso 87, 50001 Zaragoza
- Youth wing: Rolde Choben
- Ideology: Aragonese regionalism Conservatism
- Political position: Centre to centre-right
- National affiliation: People's Coalition (1982–1983)
- Colours: Yellow, Red
- Aragonese Corts: 0 / 67
- Spanish Senate (Aragonese seats): 0 / 14
- Provincial deputations (2023-2027): 2 / 77
- Mayors (2023-2027): 83 / 731
- Local Government (2023-2027): 334 / 4,155

Website
- www.partidoaragones.es

The Aragonese Party (Spanish: Partido Aragonés, PAR) is a political party which advocates the interests of Aragon within Spain. The party was founded in 1978 under the name Aragonese Regionalist Party, but changed its name in 1990, keeping the initials PAR. The founders of PAR included Emilio Eiroa, who later served as the President of the Government of Aragon from 1991 to 1993.

PAR had representation in the European Parliament between 1999 and 2004, where it sat in the European Coalition group.

== Electoral performance ==
=== Cortes of Aragon ===
Cortes of Aragon
| Election | Leading candidate | Votes | % | Seats | Gov. |
| 1983 | Hipólito Gómez de las Roces | 124,018 | 20.5 (#3) | 13 / 66 | No |
| 1987 | Hipólito Gómez de las Roces | 179,922 | 28.1 (#2) | 19 / 67 | Yes |
| 1991 | Hipólito Gómez de las Roces | 151,420 | 24.7 (#2) | 17 / 67 | Yes (Note: 1991–1993.) |
| 1991 | Hipólito Gómez de las Roces | 151,420 | 24.7 (#2) | 17 / 67 | No (Note: 1993–1995.) |
| 1995 | Emilio Eiroa | 143,573 | 20.4 (#3) | 14 / 67 | Yes |
| 1999 | José María Mur | 86,519 | 13.3 (#3) | 10 / 67 | Yes |
| 2003 | José Ángel Biel | 79,670 | 11.2 (#4) | 8 / 67 | Yes |
| 2007 | José Ángel Biel | 81,135 | 12.1 (#3) | 9 / 67 | Yes |
| 2011 | José Ángel Biel | 62,193 | 9.2 (#3) | 7 / 67 | No (Note: 2011.) |
| 2011 | José Ángel Biel | 62,193 | 9.2 (#3) | 7 / 67 | Yes (Note: 2011–2015.) |
| 2015 | Arturo Aliaga | 45,846 | 6.9 (#5) | 6 / 67 | No |
| 2019 | Arturo Aliaga | 33,978 | 5.1 (#7) | 3 / 67 | Yes |
| 2023 | Alberto Izquierdo | 13,988 | 2.1 (#8) | 1 / 67 | Yes |
| 2026 | Alberto Izquierdo | 8,161 | 1.2 (#8) | 0 / 67 | — |
