= Emilio Eiroa =

Spanish politician and lawyer

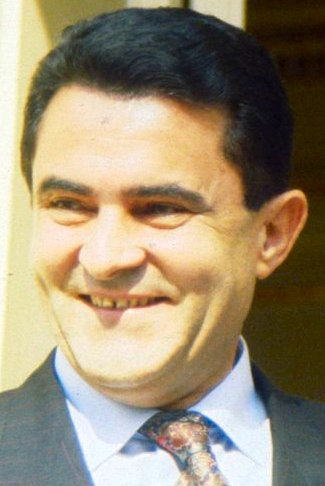
- Eiroa in 1991.

President of the Government of Aragon
- In office 12 July 1991 – 15 September 1993
- Monarch: Juan Carlos I
- Preceded by: Hipólito Gómez de las Roces
- Succeeded by: José Marco

Personal details
- Born: 23 August 1935 Vegadeo, Asturias, Spain
- Died: 10 March 2013 (aged 77) Zaragoza, Aragon, Spain
- Party: Aragonese Party

Emilio Eiroa García (23 August 1935 – 10 March 2013) was a Spanish politician and lawyer. Eiroa served as the President of the Government of Aragon from 1991 until 1993. He was also one of the founding members of the Aragonese Party. He later became the President of the Aragonese Corts from 1995 to 1999.

Eiroa was born in Vegadeo, Asturias. His father was a policeman. He moved to Zaragoza, Aragon, with his family when he was fifteen years old. He began his political career on the Zaragoza city council and as an Aragonese regional deputy.

Eiroa was first elected as a Senator to the Aragonese Corts from 1987 to 1991.

He served as the President of the Government of Aragon from 1991 to 1993, through a coalition between the Aragonese Party and the People's Party.

Eiroa focused on his law practice after leaving politics.

Eiroa died at a hospital in Zaragoza on 10 March 2013, at the age of 77. He was married with three children.
