= Marcelino Iglesias =

Spanish politician (born 1951)

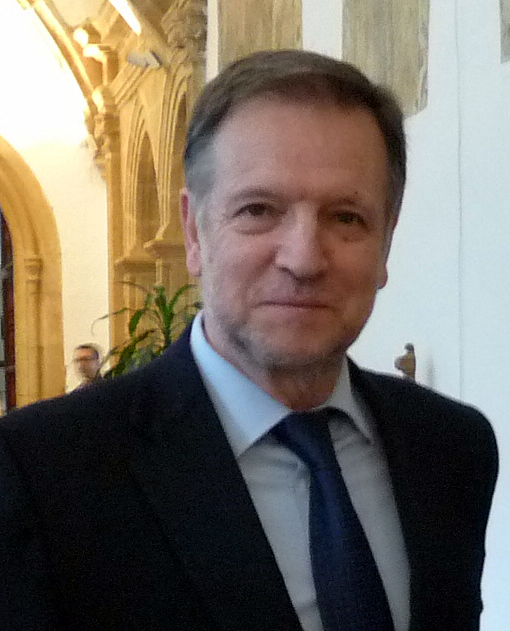

President of the Government of Aragon
- In office 2 August 1999 – 13 July 2011
- Monarch: Juan Carlos I
- Deputy: José Ángel Biel
- Preceded by: Santiago Lanzuela
- Succeeded by: Luisa Fernanda Rudi

Secretary-General of the Spanish Socialist Workers' Party of Aragon
- In office 16 December 2000 – 31 March 2012
- Preceded by: Isidoro Esteban
- Succeeded by: Javier Lambán

Personal details
- Born: Marcelino Iglesias Ricou; 16 April 1951 (age 75) Bonansa, Huesca, Spain
- Party: Spanish Socialist Workers' Party
- Spouse: José María Moriche Ibáñez

Marcelino Iglesias Ricou (born 16 April 1951) is a Spanish politician and member of the Spanish Socialist Workers' Party. He was the President of the Government of Aragon between 1999 and 2011.

== Early life ==
In the 1970s，Marcelino Iglesias worked on his family's farm. He later combined this work with tourism-related businesses in the Aran Valley, Lleida, and worked as a ski instructor there from 1974 to 1981.

== Political career ==
In March 2025, Iglesias was appointed president of the PSOE-Aragón executive following Pilar Alegría's election as secretary general of the regional party.
