= Hipólito Gómez de las Roces =

Spanish politician

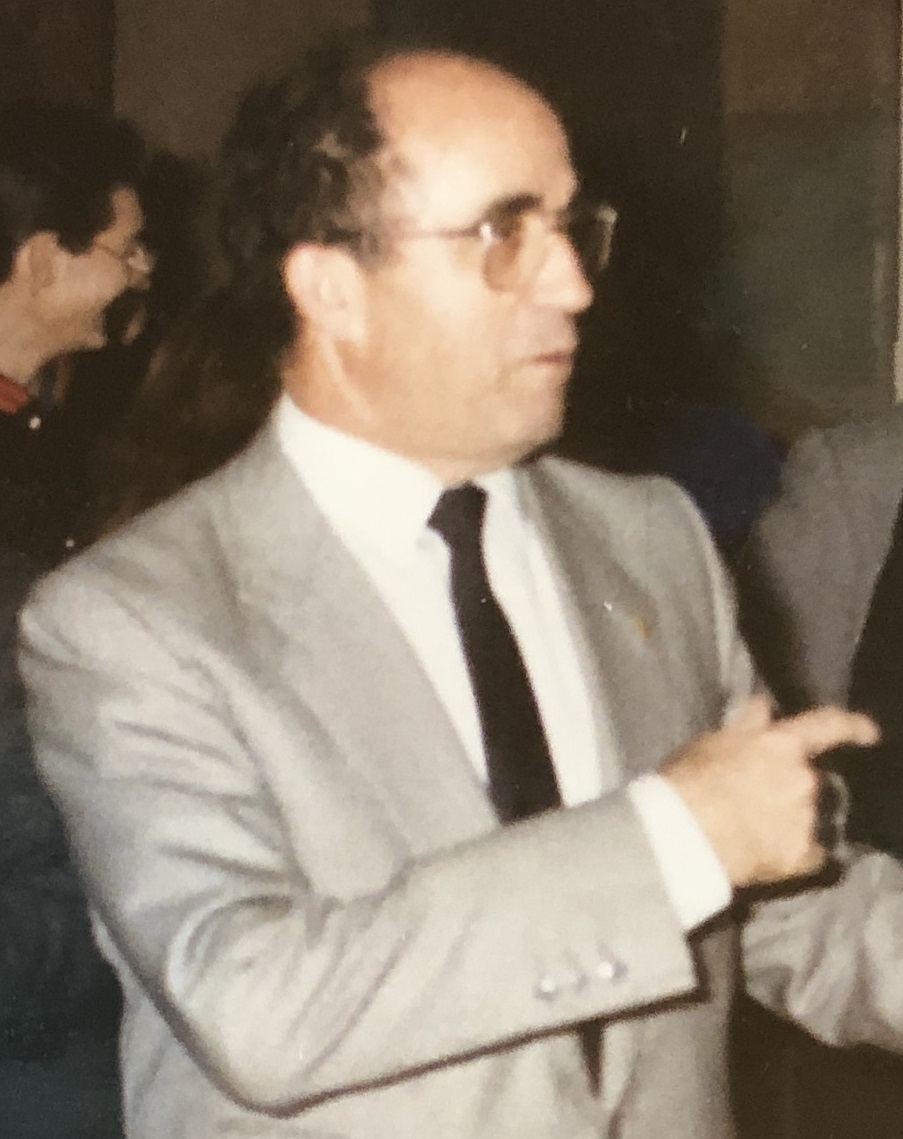

President of the Government of Aragon
- In office 30 July 1987 – 12 July 1991
- Monarch: Juan Carlos I
- Preceded by: Santiago Marraco
- Succeeded by: Emilio Eiroa

Personal details
- Born: Hipólito Gómez de las Roces Pinilla; 1932 (age 93–94) Nava, Spain
- Party: Aragonese Party (since 1978)
- Other political affiliations: Centre Independent Aragonese Candidacy (1977–1978)

Hipólito Gómez de las Roces Pinilla (Nava, Spain, 1932) is a Spanish politician who belongs to the Aragonese Party (PAR) and who previously served as President of the Government of Aragon, one of the Spanish regional administrations, from 1987 to 1991.
