= Cortes of Aragon =

Regional parliament

Coordinates: 41.656472°N 0.896750°W

Cortes of Aragon Cortes de Aragón
- Aragon unicameral legislature

Type
- Type: Spanish regional legislature
- Houses: Unicameral

Leadership
- President: María Navarro, PP since 23 June 2026
- First Vice President: Fernando Ledesma Gelas, PP since 23 June 2026
- Second Vice President: Fernando Sabés Turmo, PSOE since 23 June 2026
- 1st Secretary: Gerardo Oliván, PP since 23 June 2023
- Second Secretary: Beatriz Sánchez, PSOE since 23 June 2026

Structure
- Seats: 67
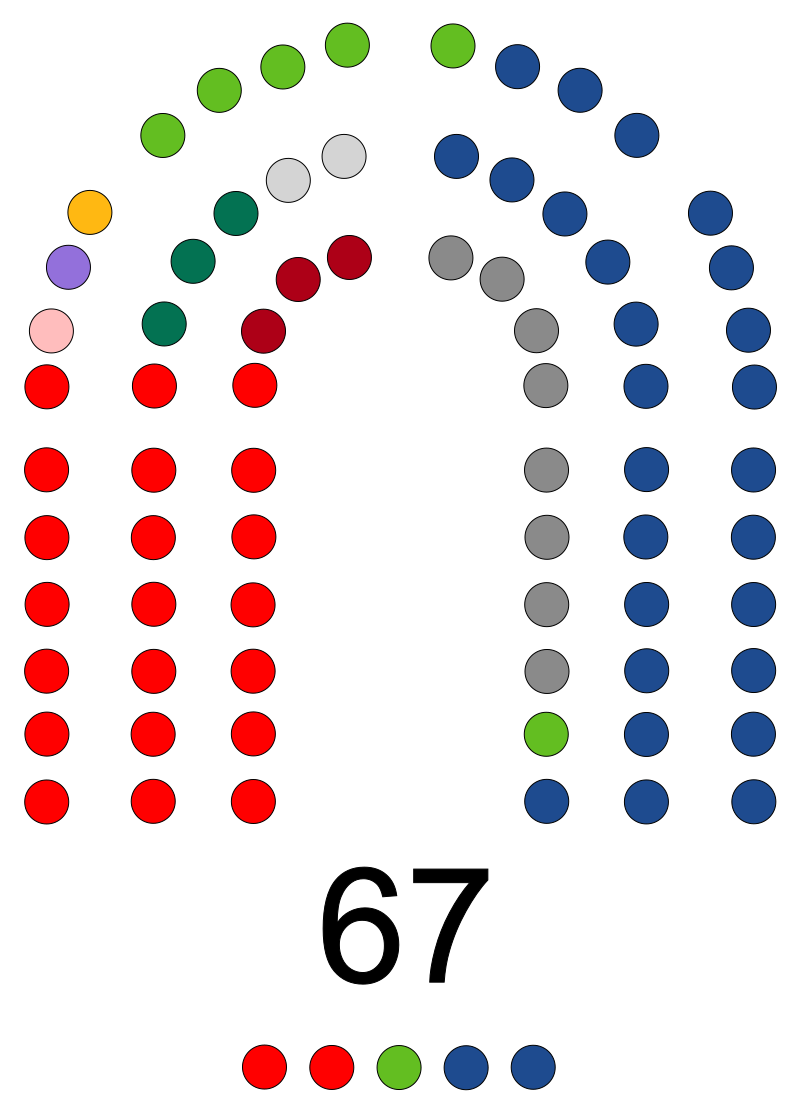
- Political groups: Government (40): PP (26); Vox (14); Opposition (27): PSOE (18); CHA (6); Existe (2); IU (1)
- Length of term: 4 years

Elections
- Last election: 8 February 2026
- Next election: 2030

Meeting place
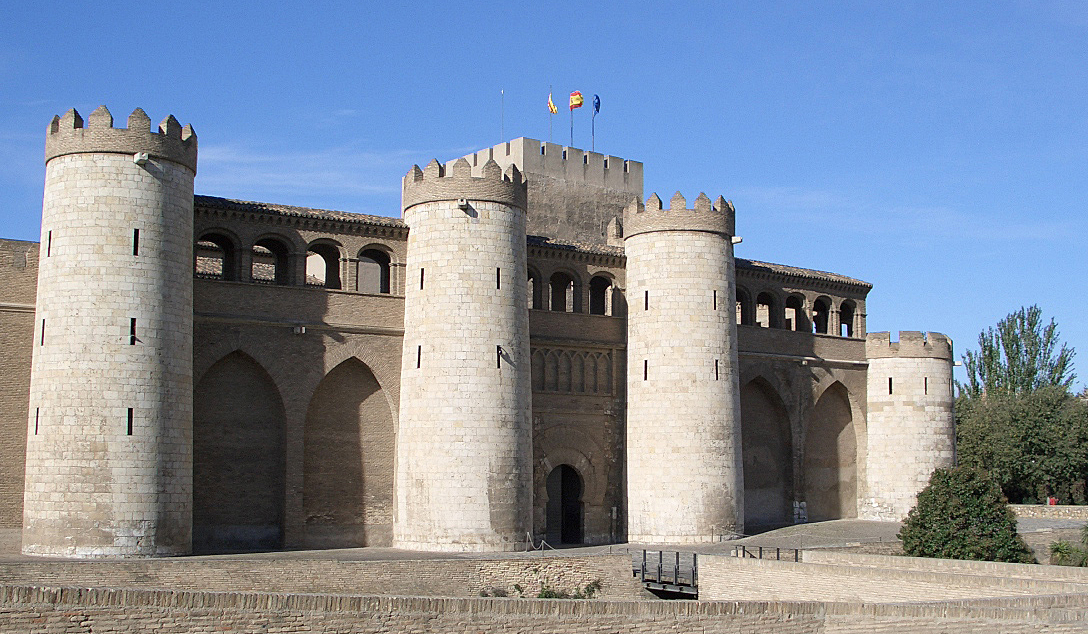
- Aljafería Palace, modern location of the Aragonese Parliament or Cortes.

The Cortes of Aragon (Spanish: Cortes de Aragón, Aragonese: Cortz d'Aragón, Catalan: Corts d'Aragó) is the regional parliament for the Spanish autonomous community of Aragon. The Cortes traces its history back to meetings summoned by the Kings of Aragon which began in 1162. Abolished in 1707, the Cortes was revived in 1983 following the passing of a Statute of Autonomy.

== Early Cortes ==
The King of Aragon was bound to summon the Cortes at least once every five years, and, following the union with Catalonia, annually. The main business of the Cortes was judicial: solving disputes between individuals or towns or dealing with complaints or grievances concerning the King's officers or Estates. The Cortes also approved legislation and voted on tax issues. The Cortes was organised into four Estates or branches: the clergy, the great nobles (Spanish: Ricos hombres), the Knights and the towns.

For the more important laws, unanimity was required between each of the Cortes' four Estates (nemine descriptante). Each member could veto any law, in which case the decision would be recorded as unamiter excepto N.N. which allowed for further debates and discussions, although these often ended in stalemates with no agreement being reached. In such cases, the decision was referred to a permanent committee which consisted of two representatives of each Estate who would judge whether the existing majority will was sound or not. These Cortes were the model for the parliaments of Sardinia and Sicily. The Cortes survived until 1707 when Philip V issued the Nueva Planta decrees, centralising political power and abolishing the former regional assemblies of the Crown of Aragon.

== Current Cortes ==
The modern Cortes were established in 1983 under Article 12 of the Statute of Autonomy for Aragon. This statute also sets out the functions of the Aragonese assembly in Article 16 and these include the election of the President of Aragon, approving the actions and legislation of the President, creating legislation, amending the Constitution of Aragon and supervising any relevant planning or economic projects. It must monitor borrowing and spending and appoint an Auditor General for Aragon. Additionally the legislature must elect the appropriate number of Senators to serve in the Spanish Senate.

== Speakers of the Cortes ==
=== Results of the elections to the Cortes of Aragon ===
Deputies in the Cortes of Aragon since 1983
Key to parties Podemos PCE IU CHA PSOE PAR Cs CDS CD PP CP AP Vox
Election	Distribution
1983	1 / 33 / 1 / 13 / 18
1987	2 / 27 / 6 / 19 / 13
1991	3 / 30 / 17 / 17
1995	5 / 2 / 19 / 14 / 27
1999	1 / 5 / 23 / 10 / 28
2003	1 / 9 / 27 / 8 / 22
2007	1 / 4 / 30 / 9 / 23
2011	4 / 4 / 22 / 7 / 30
2015	1 / 2 / 14 / 18 / 6 / 5 / 21
2019	1 / 3 / 5 / 24 / 3 / 12 / 16 / 3
2023	1 / 3 / 1 / 23 / 3 / 1 / 28 / 7
2026	1 / 6 / 18 / 2 / 1 / 26 / 14
