= Eva Almunia =

Spanish politician

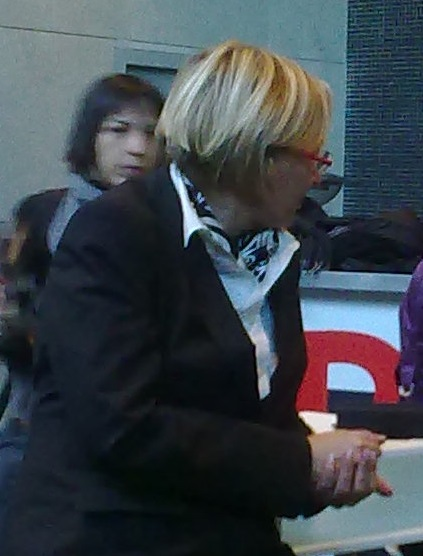
Eva Almunia

María Eva Almunia Badía (born 3 March 1960) is a Spanish Socialist Workers' Party politician.

Almunia was a councillor in her hometown of Esplús (1983–1999) and in Huesca (1999–2001). She was the minister of education (2001–2008) and minister of the presidency (2010–2011) in the Government of Aragon, under president Marcelino Iglesias. From 2008 to 2010 she was Spain's Secretary of State for Education. She was the PSOE's lead candidate in the 2011 Aragonese regional election, in which they lost power.

== Biography ==
Born in Esplús in the Province of Huesca, Almunia is married and has a daughter. She qualified as a teacher.

Almunia was a town councillor in her hometown from 1983 to 1999, then in Huesca from 1999 to 2001. From 1987 to 1995, she was a deputy in the provincial deputation of Huesca, responsible for education and culture.

From 2001 to 2008, Almunia was minister of education in the Government of Aragon, under President of the Government of Aragon Marcelino Iglesias. She left in April 2008 to be Secretary of State for Education in the national second government of José Luis Rodríguez Zapatero. She was removed from office in October 2010, having been made lead candidate for the PSOE in the 2011 Aragonese regional election. In the meantime, she took office as minister of the presidency in Aragon, still under Iglesias.

In the Aragonese regional election in May 2011, the PSOE under Almunia fell to second place behind the People's Party (PP) led by Luisa Fernanda Rudi. Rudi was installed as president after gaining a majority by sealing an agreement with the Aragonese Party (PAR), former allies of the PSOE.

In June 2011, Almunia was awarded the Grand Cross of the Civil Order of Alfonso X, the Wise and of the Order of Civil Merit.
