= Sub-national opinion polling for the 2011 Spanish general election =

In the run up to the 2011 Spanish general election, various organisations carried out opinion polling to gauge voting intention in autonomous communities and constituencies in Spain during the term of the 9th Cortes Generales. Results of such polls are displayed in this article. The date range for these opinion polls is from the previous general election, held on 9 March 2008, to the day the next election was held, on 20 November 2011.

Voting intention estimates refer mainly to a hypothetical Congress of Deputies election. Polls are listed in reverse chronological order, showing the most recent first and using the dates when the survey fieldwork was done, as opposed to the date of publication. Where the fieldwork dates are unknown, the date of publication is given instead. The highest percentage figure in each polling survey is displayed with its background shaded in the leading party's colour. If a tie ensues, this is applied to the figures with the highest percentages. The "Lead" columns on the right shows the percentage-point difference between the parties with the highest percentages in a given poll.

Refusals are generally excluded from the party vote percentages, while question wording and the treatment of "don't know" responses and those not intending to vote may vary between polling organisations. When available, seat projections are displayed below the percentages in a smaller font.

== Autonomous communities ==
=== Andalusia ===
Color key:

Exit poll

Polling firm/Commissioner	Fieldwork date	Sample size	Turnout	PSOE	PP	IULV	PA	UPyD	Lead
2011 general election	20 Nov 2011	—N/a	68.9	36.6; 25	45.6; 33	8.3; 2	1.8; 0	4.8; 0	9.0
TNS Demoscopia/RTVE–FORTA	20 Nov 2011	?	?	36.2; 24/27	45.8; 31/34	7.8; 1/2	–	–	9.6
NC Report/La Razón	14 Nov 2011	?	?	37.0– 38.0; 25	46.0– 47.0; 33	? 2	–	–	9.0
GAD3/COPE	2–10 Nov 2011	?	?	? 25/27	? 32/34	? 1	–	–	?
Sigma Dos/El Mundo	28 Oct–10 Nov 2011	?	?	33.3; 20/22	50.9; 37/39	7.6; 1	–	–	17.6
NC Report/La Razón	6 Nov 2011	?	?	39.0– 40.0; 27	44.0– 45.0; 31	? 2	–	–	5.0
Metroscopia/El País	18 Oct–5 Nov 2011	?	?	35.0; 23/25	48.7; 33/35	8.7; 2	–	–	13.7
DYM/ABC	24 Oct–3 Nov 2011	?	?	41.5; 27/28	48.4; 30/32	6.9; 1/2	–	2.0; 0	6.9
Sigma Dos/El Mundo	27 Sep–27 Oct 2011	?	?	37.4; 24/26	49.3; 33/35	7.2; 1	–	–	11.9
Commentia/Grupo Joly	18–24 Oct 2011	501	?	36.2	48.2	7.3	2.1	–	12.0
CIS	6–23 Oct 2011	2,633	?	? 24/25	? 34/35	? 1	–	–	?
GAD3/Europa Press	5–13 Oct 2011	400	70	41.2; 28/31	44.6; 30/32	6.4; 0/1	–	2.0; 0	3.4
NC Report/La Razón	9 Oct 2011	?	?	39.0– 40.0; 26	42.0– 43.0; 30	? 3	? 1	–	3.0
PSOE	14 Sep 2011	?	?	? 20/25	? 35/37	? 0/3	–	–	?
2009 EP election	7 Jun 2009	—N/a	41.7	48.2 (33)	39.7 (28)	5.2 (0)	1.0 (0)	2.5 (0)	8.5
2008 general election	9 Mar 2008	—N/a	72.8	51.9; 36	38.2; 25	5.1; 0	1.5; 0	0.9; 0	13.7

=== Aragon ===
Color key:

Exit poll

Polling firm/Commissioner	Fieldwork date	Sample size	Turnout	PSOE	PP	PAR	CHA	IU–LV	UPyD	Lead
2011 general election	20 Nov 2011	—N/a	71.0	31.5; 4	47.7; 8	(Note: Within PP.)	(Note: Within IU.)	10.5; 1	5.8; 0	16.2
TNS Demoscopia/RTVE–FORTA	20 Nov 2011	?	?	32.4; 4/5	45.1; 7/8			11.0; 0/1	–	12.7
NC Report/La Razón	14 Nov 2011	?	?	? 4	50.0– 51.0; 8			? 1	–	?
GAD3/COPE	2–10 Nov 2011	?	?	? 4	? 8			? 1	–	?
Sigma Dos/El Mundo	28 Oct–10 Nov 2011	?	?	32.6; 4/5	53.5; 8/9			7.5; 0	–	20.9
Metroscopia/El País	18 Oct–8 Nov 2011	?	?	? 4	? 8			? 1	–	?
NC Report/La Razón	6 Nov 2011	?	?	33.0– 34.0; 4	53.0– 54.0; 8			? 1	–	20.0
DYM/ABC	24 Oct–3 Nov 2011	?	?	26.3; 4	50.4; 8			18.7; 1	–	24.1
A+M/DGA	22–30 Oct 2011	2,564	?	30.7; 4	47.9; 8			12.0; 1	2.4; 0	17.2
Sigma Dos/El Mundo	27 Sep–27 Oct 2011	?	?	36.3; 5	53.3; 8			5.6; 0	–	17.0
CIS	6–23 Oct 2011	865	?	? 5	? 8			? 0	–	?
NC Report/La Razón	9 Oct 2011	?	?	27.0– 28.0; 4	53.0– 54.0; 8			? 1	–	26.0
2011 regional election	22 May 2011	—N/a	67.9	29.0 (5)	39.7 (8)	9.2 (0)	8.2 (0)	6.2 (0)	2.3 (0)	10.7
2009 EP election	7 Jun 2009	—N/a	46.4	44.0 (7)	41.7 (6)	–	2.8 (0)	3.5 (0)	3.2 (0)	2.3
2008 general election	9 Mar 2008	—N/a	75.9	46.4; 8	37.0; 5	5.2; 0	5.0; 0	2.8; 0	1.1; 0	9.4

=== Asturias ===
Color key:

Exit poll

Polling firm/Commissioner	Fieldwork date	Sample size	Turnout	PSOE	PP	IU–LV	UPyD	FAC	eQuo	Lead
2011 general election	20 Nov 2011	—N/a	64.6	29.3; 3	35.4; 3	13.2; 1	3.9; 0	14.7; 1	0.6; 0	6.1
TNS Demoscopia/RTVE–FORTA	20 Nov 2011	?	?	31.4; 3	33.7; 3	13.1; 1	–	12.3; 1	–	2.3
NC Report/La Razón	14 Nov 2011	?	?	30.0– 31.0; 3	37.0– 38.0; 3	? 1	2.0– 3.0; 0	14.0– 15.0; 1	–	7.0
GAD3/COPE	2–10 Nov 2011	?	?	? 3	? 3	? 1	–	? 1	–	Tie
Sigma Dos/El Mundo	28 Oct–10 Nov 2011	?	?	31.5; 3	40.4; 4	8.3; 0	–	14.9; 1	–	8.9
Metroscopia/El País	18 Oct–8 Nov 2011	?	?	? 2	? 5	? 1	–	? 0	–	?
NC Report/La Razón	6 Nov 2011	?	?	31.0– 32.0; 3	36.0– 37.0; 3	? 1	–	16.0– 17.0; 1	–	5.0
Ipsos/La Nueva España	1–6 Nov 2011	400	72	32.4; 3	33.3; 3	10.3; 1	5.0; 0	17.0; 1	–	0.9
DYM/ABC	24 Oct–3 Nov 2011	?	?	34.3; 3	38.5; 4	9.4; 1	7.5; 0	5.5; 0/1	2.0; 0	4.2
Sigma Dos/El Mundo	27 Sep–27 Oct 2011	?	?	31.8; 3	44.3; 4	8.2; 0	–	10.0; 1	–	12.5
CIS	6–23 Oct 2011	357	?	? 3	? 3	? 1	–	? 1	–	Tie
IU	17–21 Oct 2011	?	?	31.9; 2/3	38.5; 3/4	13.8; 1	1.1; 0	10.3; 0/1	–	6.6
NC Report/La Razón	9 Oct 2011	?	?	31.0– 32.0; 2	33.0– 34.0; 3	? 1	–	21.0– 22.0; 2	–	2.0
Low Cost/Libertad Digital	19–23 Sep 2011	800	74.3	31.0; 3	30.0; 2	10.4; 1	2.5; 0	22.6; 2	–	1.0
2011 regional election	22 May 2011	—N/a	61.7	29.9 (3)	20.0 (2)	10.3 (1)	2.4 (0)	29.7 (2)	–	0.2
2009 EP election	7 Jun 2009	—N/a	44.1	44.1 (4)	42.0 (4)	5.6 (0)	4.1 (0)	–	–	2.1
2008 general election	9 Mar 2008	—N/a	71.3	46.9; 4	41.6; 4	7.2; 0	1.4; 0	–	–	5.3

=== Balearic Islands ===
Color key:

Exit poll

Polling firm/Commissioner	Fieldwork date	Sample size	Turnout	PSOE	PP	PSM	IU–LV	UPyD	Lead
2011 general election	20 Nov 2011	—N/a	61.0	28.9; 3	49.6; 5	7.2; 0	4.9; 0	4.2; 0	20.7
TNS Demoscopia/RTVE–FORTA	20 Nov 2011	?	?	30.6; 3	48.3; 5	–	–	–	17.7
Gadeso	13 Nov 2011	900	?	? 2/3	? 5	? 0/1	–	–	?
GAD3/COPE	2–10 Nov 2011	?	?	? 3	? 5	–	–	–	?
Sigma Dos/El Mundo	28 Oct–10 Nov 2011	?	?	28.2; 3	53.2; 5	–	4.0; 3	–	25.0
Metroscopia/El País	18 Oct–8 Nov 2011	?	?	? 3	? 5	–	–	–	?
NC Report/La Razón	6 Nov 2011	?	?	31.0– 32.0; 2	52.0– 53.0; 5	11.0– 12.0; 1	–	–	?
DYM/ABC	24 Oct–3 Nov 2011	?	?	38.0; 3	48.6; 5	5.9; 0	1.4; 0	2.6; 0	10.6
IBES/Última Hora	17–30 Oct 2011	1,200	?	29.0– 30.0; 3	51.0– 52.0; 5	7.0– 8.0; 0	5.0– 6.0; 0	–	22.0
Sigma Dos/El Mundo	27 Sep–27 Oct 2011	?	?	29.7; 3	52.4; 5	–	4.8; 0	–	22.7
CIS	6–23 Oct 2011	356	?	? 3	? 5	–	–	–	?
NC Report/La Razón	9 Oct 2011	?	?	? 2	? 5	? 1	–	–	?
IBES/Última Hora	6–13 Sep 2011	1,200	?	36.0– 37.0; 3	48.0– 49.0; 5	6.0– 7.0; 0	4.0– 5.0; 0	3.0– 4.0; 0	12.0
2011 regional election	22 May 2011	—N/a	58.8	24.9 (2)	46.7 (5)	9.6 (1)	3.2 (0)	2.1 (0)	21.8
2009 EP election	7 Jun 2009	—N/a	35.6	38.7 (4)	43.7 (4)	–	2.6 (0)	2.8 (0)	5.0
2008 general election	9 Mar 2008	—N/a	67.6	44.2; 4	44.0; 4	5.4; 0	2.8; 0	0.7; 0	0.2

=== Basque Country ===
Color key:

Exit poll

Polling firm/Commissioner	Fieldwork date	Sample size	Turnout	PSE–EE	PNV	PP	IU–LV	EA	Aralar	UPyD	Bildu	Amaiur	Lead
2011 general election	20 Nov 2011	—N/a	67.3	21.6; 4	27.4; 5	17.8; 3	3.7; 0	(Note: Within Amaiur.)		1.8; 0		24.1; 6	3.3
TNS Demoscopia/RTVE–FORTA	20 Nov 2011	?	?	25.2; 4/5	23.3; 4/5	18.0; 3/4	–			–		23.1; 5/6	1.9
NC Report/La Razón	6 Nov 2011	?	?	19.0– 20.0; 4	24.0– 25.0; 5	27.0– 28.0; 5	–			–		21.0– 22.0; 4	3.0
GAD3/COPE	2–10 Nov 2011	?	?	? 4	? 5/6	? 5	–			–		? 3/4	?
Sigma Dos/El Mundo	28 Oct–10 Nov 2011	?	?	24.9; 5/6	28.9; 5	21.6; 4/5	3.0; 0			–		19.7; 3	4.0
Metroscopia/El País	18 Oct–9 Nov 2011	1,300	60–62	28.1; 5	26.3; 5	21.3; 4/5	–			–		19.1; 3/4	1.8
CIES/Grupo Noticias	2–8 Nov 2011	2,400	73	24.6; 4/5	26.1; 4/6	18.4; 3/4	4.1; 0			1.5; 0		23.9; 5	1.5
NC Report/La Razón	6 Nov 2011	?	?	21.0– 22.0; 4	26.0– 27.0; 6	27.0– 28.0; 5	–			–		18.0– 19.0; 3	1.0
Ikertalde/GPS	26 Oct–4 Nov 2011	2,254	70.8	22.3; 4/5	24.6; 4/5	20.4; 4/5	2.6; 0			0.4; 0		24.5; 3/5	0.1
DYM/ABC	24 Oct–3 Nov 2011	?	?	24.2; 5	23.5; 4	22.0; 4/5	5.1; 0			–		21.1; 4/5	0.7
Gizaker/Grupo Noticias	26–28 Oct 2011	1,700	?	18.2; 3	28.0; 5/6	21.9; 4	–			–		27.8; 5/6	0.2
Invesco/Gara	10–27 Oct 2011	1,000	73.8	21.8; 4	26.3; 5	18.3; 3	2.2; 0			–		28.8; 6	2.5
Sigma Dos/El Mundo	27 Sep–27 Oct 2011	?	?	25.1; 6	25.1; 5	21.1; 4	3.7; 0			–		19.0; 3	Tie
CIS	6–23 Oct 2011	1,176	?	? 7	? 3	? 5	–			–		? 3	?
NC Report/La Razón	9 Oct 2011	?	?	? 4	? 4	? 6	–			–		? 4	?
2011 foral elections	22 May 2011	—N/a	63.5	16.8 (3)	30.9 (7)	14.3 (1)	3.3 (0)	(Note: Within Bildu.)	3.5 (0)	0.8 (0)	25.3 (6)	–	5.6
2009 EP election	7 Jun 2009	—N/a	41.2	27.8 (7)	28.5 (6)	16.0 (3)	1.8 (0)	5.6 (0)		1.5 (0)	16.0 (2)	–	0.7
2009 regional election	1 Mar 2009	—N/a	64.5	30.4 (7)	38.1 (8)	13.9 (3)	3.5 (0)	3.6 (0)	6.0 (0)	2.1 (0)	–	–	7.7
2008 general election	9 Mar 2008	—N/a	64.0	38.1; 9	27.1; 6	18.5; 3	4.5; 0	4.5; 0	2.7; 0	0.9; 0	–	–	11.0

=== Canary Islands ===
Color key:

Exit poll

Polling firm/Commissioner	Fieldwork date	Sample size	Turnout	PSOE	PP	CC	NCa	IU–LV	UPyD	Lead
2011 general election	20 Nov 2011	—N/a	59.6	24.9; 4	48.0; 9	15.5; 2	(Note: Within CC.)	4.3; 0	2.6; 0	23.1
TNS Demoscopia/RTVE–FORTA	20 Nov 2011	?	?	27.3; 4/5	43.8; 8/9	16.7; 2/3		–	–	16.5
NC Report/La Razón	14 Nov 2011	?	?	24.0– 25.0; 4	47.0– 48.0; 8	? 3		–	–	23.0
GAD3/COPE	2–10 Nov 2011	?	?	? 4	? 8	? 3		–	–	?
Sigma Dos/El Mundo	28 Oct–10 Nov 2011	?	?	28.5; 5	49.5; 8	16.0; 2		1.5; 0	–	21.0
Metroscopia/El País	18 Oct–8 Nov 2011	?	?	? 4	? 9	? 2		–	–	?
NC Report/La Razón	6 Nov 2011	?	?	? 4	46.0– 47.0; 8	? 3		–	–	?
DYM/ABC	24 Oct–3 Nov 2011	?	?	30.1; 5	41.8; 7/8	17.2; 2/3		5.2; 0	1.1; 0	11.7
Hamalgama Métrica/ACN Press	17–28 Oct 2011	2,000	?	28.1; 3/4	46.8; 8/9	19.7; 2/3		3.5; 0	–	18.7
Sigma Dos/El Mundo	27 Sep–27 Oct 2011	?	?	28.0; 4/5	47.5; 8	17.7; 2/3		2.5; 0	–	19.5
CIS	6–23 Oct 2011	760	?	? 5	? 8	? 2		–	–	?
NC Report/La Razón	9 Oct 2011	?	?	? 4	42.0– 43.0; 7	? 4		–	–	?
2011 regional election	22 May 2011	—N/a	58.9	21.0 (4)	31.9 (6)	24.9 (4)	9.1 (1)	0.8 (0)	1.0 (0)	7.0
2009 EP election	7 Jun 2009	—N/a	39.2	36.0 (6)	40.8 (7)	15.8 (2)	–	1.6 (0)	1.2 (0)	4.8
2008 general election	9 Mar 2008	—N/a	65.9	39.6; 7	35.0; 6	17.5; 2	3.8; 0	1.2; 0	0.4; 0	4.6

=== Cantabria ===
Color key:

Exit poll

Polling firm/Commissioner	Fieldwork date	Sample size	Turnout	PP	PSOE	IU–LV	UPyD	PRC	Lead
2011 general election	20 Nov 2011	—N/a	71.6	52.2; 4	25.2; 1	3.6; 0	3.6; 0	12.5; 0	27.0
TNS Demoscopia/RTVE–FORTA	20 Nov 2011	?	?	51.1; 3/4	28.2; 1/2	–	–	–	22.9
NC Report/La Razón	14 Nov 2011	?	?	52.0– 53.0; 3	30.0– 31.0; 2	–	–	–	22.0
GAD3/COPE	2–10 Nov 2011	?	?	? 3	? 2	–	–	–	?
Sigma Dos/El Mundo	28 Oct–10 Nov 2011	?	?	55.8; 3	29.1; 2	3.0; 0	–	–	26.7
Metroscopia/El País	18 Oct–8 Nov 2011	?	?	? 3	? 2	–	–	–	?
NC Report/La Razón	6 Nov 2011	?	?	51.0– 52.0; 3	30.0– 31.0; 2	–	–	–	21.0
DYM/ABC	24 Oct–3 Nov 2011	?	?	63.2; 3/4	28.1; 1/2	4.7; 0	–	–	35.1
Sigma Dos/El Mundo	27 Sep–27 Oct 2011	?	?	53.9; 3	31.9; 2	3.2; 0	–	–	22.0
CIS	6–23 Oct 2011	269	?	? 3	? 2	–	–	–	?
NC Report/La Razón	9 Oct 2011	?	?	53.0– 54.0; 3	30.0– 31.0; 2	–	–	–	23.0
2011 regional election	22 May 2011	—N/a	69.8	46.1 (3)	16.4 (1)	3.3 (0)	1.7 (0)	29.1 (1)	17.0
2009 EP election	7 Jun 2009	—N/a	50.8	50.7 (3)	39.9 (2)	2.0 (0)	3.2 (0)	–	10.8
2008 general election	9 Mar 2008	—N/a	76.4	50.0; 3	43.6; 2	2.3; 0	1.4; 0	–	6.4

=== Castile and León ===
Color key:

Exit poll

Polling firm/Commissioner	Fieldwork date	Sample size	Turnout	PP	PSOE	IU–LV	UPyD	Lead
2011 general election	20 Nov 2011	—N/a	71.3	55.4; 21	29.2; 11	5.6; 0	6.1; 0	26.2
TNS Demoscopia/RTVE–FORTA	20 Nov 2011	?	?	54.0; 21/22	29.4; 10/11	–	–	24.6
NC Report/La Razón	14 Nov 2011	?	?	? 21	? 11	–	–	?
GAD3/COPE	2–10 Nov 2011	?	?	? 21	? 11	–	–	?
Sigma Dos/El Mundo	28 Oct–10 Nov 2011	?	?	56.7; 21/22	31.1; 10/11	4.8; 0	–	25.6
Metroscopia/El País	18 Oct–8 Nov 2011	?	?	? 21	? 11	–	–	?
NC Report/La Razón	6 Nov 2011	?	?	56.0– 57.0; 21	30.0– 31.0; 11	–	–	26.0
DYM/ABC	24 Oct–3 Nov 2011	?	?	56.4; 21/22	36.0; 10/11	2.7; 0	3.5; 0	20.4
Sigma Dos/El Mundo	27 Sep–27 Oct 2011	?	?	55.5; 21	29.8; 11	5.2; 0	–	25.7
CIS	6–23 Oct 2011	2,330	?	? 21/23	? 9/11	–	–	?
NC Report/La Razón	9 Oct 2011	?	?	57.0– 58.0; 21	30.0– 31.0; 11	–	–	27.0
2011 regional election	22 May 2011	—N/a	67.5	51.6 (21)	29.7 (11)	4.9 (0)	3.3 (0)	21.9
2009 EP election	7 Jun 2009	—N/a	51.4	51.7 (20)	38.2 (12)	2.3 (0)	3.7 (0)	13.5
2008 general election	9 Mar 2008	—N/a	77.8	50.0; 18	42.8; 14	2.5; 0	1.5; 0	7.2

=== Castilla–La Mancha ===
Color key:

Exit poll

Polling firm/Commissioner	Fieldwork date	Sample size	Turnout	PP	PSOE	IU–LV	UPyD	Lead
2011 general election	20 Nov 2011	—N/a	75.8	55.8; 14	30.3; 7	5.8; 0	5.0; 0	25.5
TNS Demoscopia/RTVE–FORTA	20 Nov 2011	?	?	54.0; 14	31.2; 7	–	–	22.8
NC Report/La Razón	14 Nov 2011	?	?	? 14	? 7	–	–	?
GAD3/COPE	2–10 Nov 2011	?	?	? 14	? 7	–	–	?
Sigma Dos/El Mundo	28 Oct–10 Nov 2011	?	?	58.1; 14	28.6; 7	4.3; 0	–	29.5
Metroscopia/El País	18 Oct–8 Nov 2011	?	?	? 14	? 7	–	–	?
NC Report/La Razón	6 Nov 2011	?	?	55.0– 56.0; 14	35.0– 36.0; 7	5.0– 6.0; 0	–	20.0
DYM/ABC	24 Oct–3 Nov 2011	?	?	56.5; 14	37.5; 7	3.6; 0	1.9; 0	19.0
Sigma Dos/El Mundo	27 Sep–27 Oct 2011	?	?	57.0; 14	31.4; 7	3.9; 0	–	25.6
CIS	6–23 Oct 2011	1,308	?	? 14	? 7	–	–	?
NC Report/La Razón	9 Oct 2011	?	?	53.0– 54.0; 13	36.0– 37.0; 8	–	–	17.0
2011 regional election	22 May 2011	—N/a	76.0	48.1 (11)	43.4 (10)	3.8 (0)	1.8 (0)	4.7
2009 EP election	7 Jun 2009	—N/a	51.7	51.5 (13)	39.9 (8)	3.0 (0)	2.6 (0)	11.6
2008 general election	9 Mar 2008	—N/a	80.0	49.4; 12	44.5; 9	2.9; 0	1.1; 0	4.9

=== Catalonia ===
Color key:

Exit poll

Polling firm/Commissioner	Fieldwork date	Sample size	Turnout	PSC	CiU	PP	ERC	ICV–EUiA	C's	UPyD	SI	Lead
2011 general election	20 Nov 2011	—N/a	65.2	26.7; 14	29.3; 16	20.7; 11	7.1; 3	8.1; 3	–	1.1; 0	–	2.6
TNS Demoscopia/RTVE–FORTA	20 Nov 2011	?	?	30.2; 15/17	24.7; 13/15	19.2; 11	7.9; 3	8.0; 3	–	–	–	5.5
NC Report/La Razón	14 Nov 2011	?	?	31.0– 32.0; 16	23.0– 24.0; 13	27.0– 28.0; 14	? 2	? 2	–	–	–	4.0
GESOP/El Periódico	7–12 Nov 2011	800	?	28.1; 15	24.0; 13/14	24.7; 13	7.8; 2/3	7.5; 2/3	–	–	–	3.4
Noxa/La Vanguardia	7–10 Nov 2011	600	?	33.2; 15/17	21.6; 12/14	25.6; 12/14	6.1; 2	7.8; 2/3	–	–	–	7.6
GAD3/COPE	2–10 Nov 2011	?	?	? 16/17	? 13	? 13/14	? 1	? 2	–	–	–	?
Sigma Dos/El Mundo	28 Oct–10 Nov 2011	?	?	30.7; 15/17	24.1; 13/15	24.4; 13	6.6; 2	5.8; 2	–	–	–	6.3
Metroscopia/El País	18 Oct–7 Nov 2011	1,700	63	30.3; 15	25.7; 14	26.8; 13	3.6; 3	5.6; 2	–	1.0; 0	–	3.5
NC Report/La Razón	6 Nov 2011	?	?	33.0– 34.0; 18	22.0– 23.0; 13	26.0– 27.0; 13	? 1	? 2	–	–	–	7.0
NC Report/La Razón	27 Oct–4 Nov 2011	624	?	32.0– 33.0; 17	22.0– 23.0; 13	27.0– 28.0; 14	? 1	? 2	–	–	–	5.0
CiU	3 Nov 2011	?	?	? 16	? 14/16	? 12/14	? 1/2	? 2	–	–	–	?
DYM/ABC	24 Oct–3 Nov 2011	1,157	?	36.7; 18/19	23.9; 12/14	24.1; 11/14	8.6; 2	5.2; 1	–	1.0; 0	–	12.6
Sigma Dos/El Mundo	27 Sep–27 Oct 2011	?	?	33.9; 18	22.6; 12/13	24.9; 13/14	5.6; 1	6.0; 2	–	–	–	9.0
Feedback	26 Oct 2011	?	?	? 15/16	? 16	? 12	? 1/2	? 2	–	–	–	?
NC Report/La Razón	21–24 Oct 2011	682	?	33.0– 34.0; 18	21.0– 22.0; 12	27.0– 28.0; 14	4.0– 5.0; 1	6.0– 7.0; 2	–	–	–	6.0
CIS	6–23 Oct 2011	1,937	?	? 16	? 13	? 12	? 3	? 3	–	–	–	?
NC Report/La Razón	21 Oct 2011	?	?	32.0– 33.0; 17	22.0– 23.0; 13	27.0– 28.0; 14	5.0– 6.0; 1	6.0– 7.0; 2	–	–	–	5.0
GAPS/Ara	15 Oct 2011	?	?	33.7; 16/18	23.9; 13/15	22.1; 12/13	7.3; 2/3	4.4; 1/2	–	–	–	9.8
NC Report/La Razón	14 Oct 2011	?	?	34.0– 35.0; 18	21.0– 22.0; 13	25.0– 26.0; 13	5.0– 6.0; 1	6.0– 7.0; 2	–	–	–	9.0
NC Report/La Razón	9 Oct 2011	?	?	29.0– 30.0; 15	26.0– 27.0; 15	25.0– 26.0; 13	? 2	? 2	–	–	–	3.0
GAD3/Europa Press	29 Sep–5 Oct 2011	422	67	29.8; 15/17	26.1; 13/15	24.8; 12/14	? 1/2	? 1/2	–	–	–	3.7
Noxa/La Vanguardia	28 Sep–4 Oct 2011	600	?	35.4; 18/19	21.2; 11/12	25.5; 13/14	4.8; 1/2	6.1; 2	–	–	–	9.9
Feedback/CiU	18–22 Jul 2011	1,200	54.7	32.1; 16	29.7; 16	21.7; 12	4.4; 1	6.3; 2	–	–	–	2.4
GESOP/El Periódico	19–21 Jun 2011	800	?	33.0; 17/18	23.0; 14/15	21.9; 12	4.9; 1	5.8; 2	–	–	–	10.0
2010 regional election	28 Nov 2010	—N/a	58.8	18.4 (10)	38.4 (24)	12.4 (5)	7.0 (3)	7.4 (3)	3.4 (1)	0.2 (0)	3.3 (1)	20.0
GESOP/El Periódico	26–28 Sep 2010	800	?	32.0; 17	24.6; 15	22.3; 12	6.2; 1	6.5; 2	–	–	–	7.4
GESOP/El Periódico	10–11 Jun 2010	800	?	30.1	26.7	20.8	6.8	5.9	–	–	–	3.4
GESOP/El Periódico	15–18 Mar 2010	?	?	36.0; 20/22	22.6; 12/13	20.0; 10/11	5.9; 1	5.1; 1/2	–	–	–	13.4
GESOP/El Periódico	26–28 Oct 2009	800	?	38.7; 21/23	21.2; 11/13	17.9; 9/10	6.0; 1/3	6.7; 2/3	–	–	–	17.5
2009 EP election	7 Jun 2009	—N/a	36.9	36.0 (19)	22.4 (13)	18.0 (9)	9.2 (4)	6.1 (2)	0.4 (0)	0.8 (0)	–	13.6
GESOP/El Periódico	9–11 Mar 2009	800	?	41.5; 22/23	21.2; 11/12	17.1; 9	6.5; 1/2	4.6; 1/2	–	–	–	20.3
GESOP/El Periódico	10–13 Nov 2008	?	?	42.5; 22/24	21.2; 10/12	17.2; 9	7.3; 2/3	4.8; 1/2	–	–	–	21.3
GESOP/El Periódico	1–2 Jul 2008	?	?	43.9; 23/25	19.4; 9/11	17.3; 9	7.9; 2/3	5.0; 1/2	–	–	–	24.5
GESOP/El Periódico	22–24 Apr 2008	?	?	44.1; 24/25	22.6; 10/11	15.0; 7/8	7.8; 3	5.1; 1/2	–	–	–	21.5
2008 general election	9 Mar 2008	—N/a	70.3	45.4; 25	20.9; 10	16.4; 8	7.8; 3	4.9; 1	0.7; 0	0.2; 0	–	24.5

=== Extremadura ===
Color key:

Exit poll

Polling firm/Commissioner	Fieldwork date	Sample size	Turnout	PSOE	PP	IU–LV	UPyD	Lead
2011 general election	20 Nov 2011	—N/a	73.9	37.2; 4	51.2; 6	5.7; 0	3.5; 0	14.0
TNS Demoscopia/RTVE–FORTA	20 Nov 2011	?	?	39.0; 5	48.4; 5	–	–	9.4
NC Report/La Razón	14 Nov 2011	?	?	39.0– 40.0; 5	50.0– 51.0; 5	–	–	11.0
GAD3/COPE	2–10 Nov 2011	?	?	? 4	? 6	–	–	?
Sigma Dos/El Mundo	28 Oct–10 Nov 2011	?	?	35.6; 3/4	54.3; 6/7	4.0; 0	–	18.7
Metroscopia/El País	18 Oct–8 Nov 2011	?	?	? 3/4	? 6/7	–	–	?
NC Report/La Razón	6 Nov 2011	?	?	40.0– 41.0; 5	49.0– 50.0; 5	5.0– 6.0; 0	–	9.0
DYM/ABC	24 Oct–3 Nov 2011	?	?	40.6; 4/5	53.4; 5/6	1.5; 0	2.6; 0	12.8
Sigma Dos/El Mundo	27 Sep–27 Oct 2011	?	?	35.8; 3/4	53.7; 6/7	5.4; 0	–	17.9
CIS	6–23 Oct 2011	540	?	? 4	? 6	–	–	?
NC Report/La Razón	9 Oct 2011	?	?	40.0– 41.0; 5	48.0– 49.0; 5	–	–	8.0
2011 regional election	22 May 2011	—N/a	74.7	43.4 (5)	46.1 (5)	5.7 (0)	1.1 (0)	2.7
2009 EP election	7 Jun 2009	—N/a	50.6	48.6 (5)	44.1 (5)	2.5 (0)	1.9 (0)	4.5
2008 general election	9 Mar 2008	—N/a	78.5	52.3; 5	41.8; 5	2.9; 0	0.8; 0	10.5

=== Galicia ===
Color key:

Exit poll

Polling firm/Commissioner	Fieldwork date	Sample size	Turnout	PP	PSdeG–PSOE	BNG	IU–LV	UPyD	Lead
2011 general election	20 Nov 2011	—N/a	62.2	52.5; 15	27.8; 6	11.2; 2	4.1; 0	1.2; 0	24.7
TNS Demoscopia/RTVE–FORTA	20 Nov 2011	?	?	49.3; 14/15	28.2; 6/7	12.0; 2	–	–	21.1
NC Report/La Razón	14 Nov 2011	?	?	50.0– 51.0; 15	28.0– 29.0; 6	14.0– 15.0; 2	–	–	22.0
Sondaxe/La Voz de Galicia	13 Nov 2011	?	70.5	52.0; 15	30.0; 7	10.0; 1	–	–	22.0
Ipsos/Faro de Vigo	13 Nov 2011	?	76	48.5; 14	31.0; 7	11.0; 2	5.4; 0	1.3; 0	17.5
GAD3/COPE	2–10 Nov 2011	?	?	? 15	? 6	? 2	–	–	?
Sigma Dos/El Mundo	28 Oct–10 Nov 2011	?	?	52.5; 15	28.9; 6	10.3; 2	2.9; 0	–	23.6
Metroscopia/El País	18 Oct–8 Nov 2011	?	?	? 15	? 6	? 2	–	–	?
NC Report/La Razón	6 Nov 2011	?	?	51.0– 52.0; 15	28.0– 29.0; 6	? 2	–	–	23.0
DYM/ABC	24 Oct–3 Nov 2011	?	?	52.1; 14/15	32.1; 7/8	7.8; 1	4.3; 0	2.5; 0	20.0
Sigma Dos/El Mundo	27 Sep–27 Oct 2011	?	?	50.4; 14/15	30.6; 6/7	11.7; 2	3.1; 0	–	19.8
CIS	6–23 Oct 2011	1,371	?	? 15	? 6	? 2	–	–	?
NC Report/La Razón	9 Oct 2011	?	?	53.0– 54.0; 14	22.0– 23.0; 6	19.0– 20.0; 3	–	–	31.0
2009 EP election	7 Jun 2009	—N/a	43.3	50.0 (15)	35.3 (8)	9.1 (0)	1.3 (0)	1.2 (0)	14.7
2009 regional election	1 Mar 2009	—N/a	64.4	46.7 (13)	31.0 (8)	16.0 (2)	1.4 (0)	1.0 (0)	15.7
2008 general election	9 Mar 2008	—N/a	70.5	43.9; 11	40.6; 10	11.5; 2	1.4; 0	0.5; 0	3.3

=== La Rioja ===
Color key:

Exit poll

Polling firm/Commissioner	Fieldwork date	Sample size	Turnout	PP	PSOE	IU–LV	UPyD	Lead
2011 general election	20 Nov 2011	—N/a	72.8	54.7; 3	31.1; 1	4.6; 0	6.0; 0	23.6
TNS Demoscopia/RTVE–FORTA	20 Nov 2011	?	?	53.0; 2/3	32.5; 1/2	–	–	20.5
NC Report/La Razón	14 Nov 2011	?	?	55.0– 56.0; 3	31.0– 32.0; 1	–	–	24.0
GAD3/COPE	2–10 Nov 2011	?	?	? 3	? 1	–	–	?
Sigma Dos/El Mundo	28 Oct–10 Nov 2011	?	?	58.3; 3	31.2; 1	3.2; 0	–	27.1
Metroscopia/El País	18 Oct–8 Nov 2011	?	?	? 3	? 1	–	–	?
NC Report/La Razón	6 Nov 2011	?	?	? 3	? 1	–	–	?
DYM/ABC	24 Oct–3 Nov 2011	?	?	59.2; 3	38.2; 1	2.6; 0	–	21.0
Sigma Dos/El Mundo	27 Sep–27 Oct 2011	?	?	58.0; 7/8	30.6; 2/3	3.0; 0	–	27.4
CIS	6–23 Oct 2011	257	?	? 3	? 1	–	–	?
NC Report/La Razón	9 Oct 2011	?	?	? 3	? 1	–	–	?
2011 regional election	22 May 2011	—N/a	69.8	52.0 (3)	30.3 (1)	3.7 (0)	3.6 (0)	21.7
2009 EP election	7 Jun 2009	—N/a	50.4	50.7 (2)	40.6 (2)	1.9 (0)	3.0 (0)	10.1
2008 general election	9 Mar 2008	—N/a	79.3	49.5; 2	43.6; 2	1.9; 0	1.3; 0	5.9

=== Madrid ===
Color key:

Exit poll

Polling firm/Commissioner	Fieldwork date	Sample size	Turnout	PP	PSOE	IU–LV	UPyD	eQuo	Lead
2011 general election	20 Nov 2011	—N/a	73.3	51.0; 19	26.0; 10	8.0; 3	10.3; 4	1.9; 0	25.0
TNS Demoscopia/RTVE–FORTA	20 Nov 2011	?	?	50.0; 19/20	27.9; 10/11	7.7; 2/3	9.3; 3	–	22.1
NC Report/La Razón	14 Nov 2011	?	?	52.0– 53.0; 20	27.0– 28.0; 11	? 3	8.0– 9.0; 2	–	25.0
GAD3/COPE	2–10 Nov 2011	?	?	? 20/21	? 10	? 2	? 3	? 0/1	?
Sigma Dos/El Mundo	28 Oct–10 Nov 2011	?	?	52.5; 19/20	29.0; 11	7.9; 2/3	8.0; 3	–	23.5
Metroscopia/El País	18 Oct–8 Nov 2011	?	?	? 21	? 10	? 3	? 2	–	?
NC Report/La Razón	6 Nov 2011	?	?	53.0– 54.0; 20	28.0– 29.0; 11	? 3	? 2	–	25.0
DYM/ABC	24 Oct–3 Nov 2011	400	?	53.3; 20	31.0; 11/12	6.8; 2	7.9; 2/3	0.4; 0	22.3
Sigma Dos/El Mundo	27 Sep–27 Oct 2011	?	?	54.8; 20/21	26.9; 10/11	5.4; 2	8.3; 3	–	27.9
CIS	6–23 Oct 2011	773	?	? 21/22	? 9/10	? 2	? 3	–	?
GAD3/Europa Press	13–19 Oct 2011	400	?	50.2; 19/20	29.9; 11/12	6.2; 2	7.6; 2/3	3.5; 1	20.3
PP	10 Oct 2011	?	?	? 20	? 12/13	? 1/2	? 2	–	?
NC Report/La Razón	9 Oct 2011	?	?	53.0– 54.0; 20	28.0– 29.0; 10	? 4	? 2	–	25.0
2011 regional election	22 May 2011	—N/a	65.9	51.7 (20)	26.3 (10)	9.6 (3)	6.3 (2)	–	25.4
2009 EP election	7 Jun 2009	—N/a	50.4	48.6 (19)	35.6 (13)	4.5 (1)	6.8 (2)	–	13.0
2008 general election	9 Mar 2008	—N/a	79.1	49.2; 18	39.7; 15	4.7; 1	3.7; 1	–	9.5

=== Murcia ===
Color key:

Exit poll

Polling firm/Commissioner	Fieldwork date	Sample size	Turnout	PP	PSOE	IU–LV	UPyD	Lead
2011 general election	20 Nov 2011	—N/a	74.1	64.2; 8	21.0; 2	5.7; 0	6.3; 0	43.2
TNS Demoscopia/RTVE–FORTA	20 Nov 2011	?	?	62.7; 7/8	21.6; 2/3	–	–	41.1
NC Report/La Razón	14 Nov 2011	?	?	60.0– 61.0; 7	26.0– 27.0; 3	5.0– 6.0; 0	–	34.0
GAD3/COPE	2–10 Nov 2011	?	?	? 7	? 3	–	–	?
Sigma Dos/El Mundo	28 Oct–10 Nov 2011	?	?	69.7; 8	21.0; 2	3.8; 0	–	48.7
Metroscopia/El País	18 Oct–8 Nov 2011	?	?	? 7	? 3	–	–	?
NC Report/La Razón	6 Nov 2011	?	?	60.0– 61.0; 7	28.0– 29.0; 3	–	–	32.0
DYM/ABC	24 Oct–3 Nov 2011	?	?	64.6; 8	29.1; 2	1.4; 0	2.3; 0	35.5
Sigma Dos/El Mundo	27 Sep–27 Oct 2011	?	?	65.6; 7/8	22.5; 2/3	5.1; 0	–	43.1
CIS	6–23 Oct 2011	420	?	? 7/8	? 2/3	–	–	?
NC Report/La Razón	9 Oct 2011	?	?	60.0– 61.0; 7	29.0– 30.0; 3	7.0– 8.0; 0	–	31.0
2011 regional election	22 May 2011	—N/a	67.9	58.8 (7)	23.9 (3)	7.8 (0)	4.5 (0)	34.9
2009 EP election	7 Jun 2009	—N/a	48.0	61.5 (7)	29.8 (3)	3.0 (0)	2.9 (0)	31.7
2008 general election	9 Mar 2008	—N/a	79.6	61.2; 7	32.9; 3	2.9; 0	0.9; 0	28.3

=== Navarre ===
Color key:

Exit poll

Polling firm/Commissioner	Fieldwork date	Sample size	Turnout	PP	PSOE	GBai	I–E	UPyD	UPN	Amaiur	Lead
2011 general election	20 Nov 2011	—N/a	68.9	38.2; 2	22.0; 1	12.8; 1	5.5; 0	2.1; 0		14.9; 1	16.2
TNS Demoscopia/RTVE–FORTA	20 Nov 2011	?	?	37.3; 2/3	23.5; 1/2	11.3; 0/1	–	–		15.3; 1	13.8
NC Report/La Razón	14 Nov 2011	?	?	45.0– 46.0; 3	26.0– 27.0; 1	? 0	–	–		? 1	19.0
Gizaker/Diario de Noticias	11 Nov 2011	?	?	40.8; 2/3	18.4; 1	11.6; 0/1	6.6; 0	–		18.8; 1	22.0
GAD3/COPE	2–10 Nov 2011	?	?	? 3	? 1	? 0	–	–		? 1	?
Sigma Dos/El Mundo	28 Oct–10 Nov 2011	?	?	44.5; 3	19.4; 1	14.3; 1	5.1; 0	–		11.6; 0	25.1
CIES/Diario de Navarra	6–9 Nov 2011	800	73	41.3; 3	24.6; 1/2	11.1; 0/1	5.9; 0	2.5; 0		12.5; 0/1	16.7
Metroscopia/El País	18 Oct–8 Nov 2011	376	65	? 3	? 1	? 0	–	–		? 1	?
NC Report/La Razón	6 Nov 2011	?	?	46.0– 47.0; 3	27.0– 28.0; 1	? 0	–	–		15.0– 16.0; 1	19.0
DYM/ABC	24 Oct–3 Nov 2011	?	?	41.6; 2/3	25.3; 1/2	–	–	–		18.5; 1	16.3
Invesco/Gara	10–27 Oct 2011	400	72.0	42.1; 3	20.7; 1	8.6; 0	6.4; 0	–		19.3; 1	21.4
Sigma Dos/El Mundo	27 Sep–27 Oct 2011	?	?	47.1; 3	23.4; 1	8.6; 0	3.9; 0	–		12.6; 1	23.7
CIS	6–23 Oct 2011	373	?	? 3	? 2	? 0	–	–		? 0	?
NC Report/La Razón	9 Oct 2011	?	?	46.0– 47.0; 3	? 1	? 0	–	–		? 1	?
2011 regional election	22 May 2011	—N/a	67.4	7.3 (0)	15.9 (1)	15.4 (1)	5.7 (0)	0.7 (0)	34.5 (2)	13.3 (1)	18.6
2009 EP election	7 Jun 2009	—N/a	42.7	37.8 (3)	31.5 (2)	8.8 (0)	3.3 (0)	2.1 (0)	–	11.4 (0)	6.3
2008 general election	9 Mar 2008	—N/a	72.1	39.2; 2	34.8; 2	18.4; 1	3.3; 0	0.8; 0		–	4.4

=== Valencian Community ===
Color key:

Exit poll

Polling firm/Commissioner	Fieldwork date	Sample size	Turnout	PP	PSOE	IU–LV	Bloc Compromís	UPyD	Lead
2011 general election	20 Nov 2011	—N/a	74.2	53.3; 20	26.8; 10	6.5; 1	4.8; 1	5.6; 1	26.5
TNS Demoscopia/RTVE–FORTA	20 Nov 2011	?	?	52.8; 20/22	26.5; 9/11	6.2; 1/2	4.7; 0/1	5.1; 0/1	26.3
NC Report/La Razón	14 Nov 2011	?	?	50.0– 51.0; 19	28.0– 29.0; 10	? 2	? 2	–	22.0
GAD3/COPE	2–10 Nov 2011	?	?	? 20	? 11	? 1	? 1	–	?
Sigma Dos/El Mundo	28 Oct–10 Nov 2011	?	?	57.5; 21	27.9; 10/11	5.9; 1	4.0; 0/1	–	25.6
Metroscopia/El País	18 Oct–8 Nov 2011	?	?	? 20	? 11	? 1	? 1	–	?
NC Report/La Razón	6 Nov 2011	?	?	49.0– 50.0; 19	29.0– 30.0; 10	? 2	? 2	–	20.0
DYM/ABC	24 Oct–3 Nov 2011	?	?	57.3; 20/21	32.0; 11/12	3.5; 0	4.9; 1	1.3; 0	25.3
Sigma Dos/El Mundo	27 Sep–27 Oct 2011	?	?	55.6; 20	29.5; 11	5.6; 1	4.8; 1	–	26.1
CIS	6–23 Oct 2011	1,118	?	? 20	? 11	? 1	? 1	–	?
NC Report/La Razón	9 Oct 2011	?	?	53.0– 54.0; 20	30.0– 31.0; 11	? 1	? 1	–	23.0
Metroscopia/El País	3–4 Oct 2011	1,000	73	50.4; 19/20	30.6; 11	6.1; 1/2	5.5; 1	–	19.8
Astel/PP	1–14 Sep 2011	1,200	?	53.6; 20	32.3; 11	5.2; 1	4.7; 1	1.5; 0	21.3
PSOE	26 Aug 2011	1,000	?	? 21/24	? 8/11	? 0	? 1/3	–	?
2011 regional election	22 May 2011	—N/a	70.2	49.4 (20)	28.0 (11)	5.9 (1)	7.2 (1)	2.5 (0)	21.4
Metroscopia/El País	5–6 Oct 2009	?	?	55.6; 21	35.4; 12	3.9; 0	1.1; 0	–	20.2
Astel/PP	1–4 Sep 2009	520	80.0	53.2; 20	36.2; 13	2.4; 0	1.2; 0	–	17.0
2009 EP election	7 Jun 2009	—N/a	52.8	52.2 (19)	37.6 (14)	2.8 (0)	1.0 (0)	2.1 (0)	14.6
Metroscopia/El País	9 Oct 2008	?	?	49.3; 19	40.8; 14	–	–	–	8.5
2008 general election	9 Mar 2008	—N/a	78.8	51.6; 19	41.0; 14	2.7; 0	1.1; 0	0.7; 0	10.6

== Constituencies ==
=== A Coruña ===
Color key:

Exit poll

Polling firm/Commissioner	Fieldwork date	Sample size	Turnout	PP	PSdeG–PSOE	BNG	IU–LV	UPyD	Lead
2011 general election	20 Nov 2011	—N/a	62.4	51.5; 5	27.3; 2	11.7; 1	4.6; 0	1.3; 0	24.2
TNS Demoscopia/RTVE–FORTA	20 Nov 2011	?	?	47.9; 4/5	28.0; 2/3	12.8; 1	–	–	19.9
Sondaxe/La Voz de Galicia	13 Nov 2011	?	?	51.0; 5	29.0; 2	10.0; 1	–	–	22.0
Ipsos/Faro de Vigo	13 Nov 2011	?	?	? 4	? 3	? 1	–	–	?
Sigma Dos/El Mundo	28 Oct–10 Nov 2011	?	?	51.0– 52.0; 5	28.0– 29.0; 2	10.0– 11.0; 1	2.0– 3.0; 0	–	23.0
Metroscopia/El País	18 Oct–8 Nov 2011	?	?	? 5	? 2	? 1	–	–	?
DYM/ABC	24 Oct–3 Nov 2011	?	?	53.4; 5	33.4; 3	5.6; 0	6.2; 0	–	20.0
Sigma Dos/El Mundo	27 Sep–27 Oct 2011	?	?	50.0– 51.0; 4/5	29.0– 30.0; 2/3	11.0– 12.0; 1	2.0– 6.0; 0	–	21.0
CIS	6–23 Oct 2011	417	?	? 5	? 2	? 1	–	–	?
2009 EP election	7 Jun 2009	—N/a	41.3	48.5; 5	35.7; 3	9.5; 0	1.5; 0	1.6; 0	12.8
2009 regional election	1 Mar 2009	—N/a	63.0	45.5; 4	30.6; 3	15.7; 1	1.1; 0	1.7; 0	14.9
2008 general election	9 Mar 2008	—N/a	70.0	42.7; 4	41.0; 3	12.0; 1	1.6; 0	0.6; 0	1.7

=== Álava ===
Color key:

Exit poll

Polling firm/Commissioner	Fieldwork date	Sample size	Turnout	PSE–EE	PP	PNV	IU–LV	EA	Aralar	UPyD	Bildu	Amaiur	Lead
2011 general election	20 Nov 2011	—N/a	67.3	23.4; 1	27.2; 1	18.8; 1	4.1; 0			2.8; 0		19.1; 1	3.8
TNS Demoscopia/RTVE–FORTA	20 Nov 2011	?	?	25.9; 1	27.1; 1	17.8; 1	–			–		18.4; 1	1.2
Sigma Dos/El Mundo	28 Oct–10 Nov 2011	?	?	27.0– 28.0; 1/2	29.0– 30.0; 1/2	20.0– 21.0; 1	3.0– 4.0; 0			–		14.0– 15.0; 0	2.0
Metroscopia/El País	18 Oct–9 Nov 2011	300	?	? 1	? 1/2	? 1	–			–		? 0/1	?
CIES/Grupo Noticias	2–8 Nov 2011	800	?	23.9; 1	28.1; 1	19.3; 1	4.5; 0			3.5; 0		18.9; 1	4.2
Ikertalde/GPS	26 Oct–4 Nov 2011	504	67.8	24.7; 1	30.3; 1/2	19.0; 0/1	2.5; 0			0.5; 0		18.0; 0/1	5.6
DYM/ABC	24 Oct–3 Nov 2011	?	?	29.2; 1	30.8; 1/2	15.6; 0/1	3.2; 0			–		17.5; 1	1.6
Gizaker/Grupo Noticias	26–28 Oct 2011	450	?	20.0; 1	33.0; 1	21.4; 1	–			–		21.0; 1	11.6
Invesco/Gara	10–27 Oct 2011	200	75.0	17.1; 1	33.1; 1	24.6; 1	–			–		19.8; 1	8.5
Sigma Dos/El Mundo	27 Sep–27 Oct 2011	?	?	31.0– 32.0; 2	25.0– 26.0; 1	17.0– 18.0; 1	3.0– 4.0; 0			–		14.0– 15.0; 3	6.0
CIS	6–23 Oct 2011	374	?	? 2	? 2	? 0	–			–		? 0	Tie
2011 foral elections	22 May 2011	—N/a	63.6	16.3; 1	26.0; 1	23.7; 1	4.1; 0		2.7; 0	1.8; 0	21.0; 1	–	2.3
2009 EP election	7 Jun 2009	—N/a	39.5	31.4; 2	25.8; 1	19.6; 1	1.9; 0	4.7; 0		2.4; 0	10.9; 0	–	5.6
2009 regional election	1 Mar 2009	—N/a	65.1	31.2; 2	21.1; 1	30.0; 1	3.3; 0	3.5; 0	4.3; 0	3.9; 0	–	–	1.2
2008 general election	9 Mar 2008	—N/a	69.6	40.7; 2	26.5; 1	18.7; 1	4.2; 0	3.1; 0	1.7; 0	1.2; 0	–	–	14.2

=== Albacete ===
Color key:

Exit poll

Polling firm/Commissioner	Fieldwork date	Sample size	Turnout	PP	PSOE	IU–LV	UPyD	Lead
2011 general election	20 Nov 2011	—N/a	76.1	55.1; 3	30.1; 1	6.2; 0	5.0; 0	25.0
TNS Demoscopia/RTVE–FORTA	20 Nov 2011	?	?	54.2; 3	29.2; 1	–	–	25.0
Sigma Dos/El Mundo	28 Oct–10 Nov 2011	?	?	57.0– 58.0; 3	29.0– 30.0; 1	2.0– 3.0; 0	–	28.0
Metroscopia/El País	18 Oct–8 Nov 2011	?	?	? 3	? 1	–	–	?
DYM/ABC	24 Oct–3 Nov 2011	?	?	56.6; 3	37.1; 1	6.3; 0	–	19.5
Sigma Dos/El Mundo	27 Sep–27 Oct 2011	?	?	56.0– 57.0; 3	32.0– 33.0; 1	2.0– 3.0; 0	–	24.0
CIS	6–23 Oct 2011	269	?	? 3	? 1	–	–	?
2011 regional election	22 May 2011	—N/a	74.8	48.4; 2	41.7; 2	4.7; 0	1.9; 0	6.7
2009 EP election	7 Jun 2009	—N/a	50.6	49.4; 2	41.4; 2	3.3; 0	2.6; 0	8.0
2008 general election	9 Mar 2008	—N/a	79.7	47.4; 2	45.7; 2	3.4; 0	1.3; 0	1.7

=== Alicante ===
Color key:

Exit poll

Polling firm/Commissioner	Fieldwork date	Sample size	Turnout	PP	PSOE	IU–LV	Bloc Compromís	UPyD	Lead
2011 general election	20 Nov 2011	—N/a	73.5	55.2; 8	27.0; 4	6.5; 0	3.1; 0	5.6; 0	28.2
TNS Demoscopia/RTVE–FORTA	20 Nov 2011	?	?	56.2; 8/9	26.4; 3/4	5.7; 0/1	–	–	29.8
Sigma Dos/El Mundo	28 Oct–10 Nov 2011	?	?	58.0– 59.0; 8	29.0– 30.0; 4	4.0– 5.0; 0	3.0– 4.0; 0	–	29.0
Metroscopia/El País	18 Oct–8 Nov 2011	?	?	? 8	? 3	? 1	–	–	?
DYM/ABC	24 Oct–3 Nov 2011	?	?	56.8; 8	30.4; 4	3.3; 0	5.5; 0	3.0; 0	26.4
Sigma Dos/El Mundo	27 Sep–27 Oct 2011	?	?	58.0– 59.0; 8	27.0– 28.0; 4	5.0– 6.0; 0	4.0– 5.0; 0	–	31.0
CIS	6–23 Oct 2011	424	?	? 8	? 4	? 0	–	–	?
Metroscopia/El País	3–4 Oct 2011	?	?	? 7/8	? 4	? 0/1	–	–	?
Astel/PP	1–14 Sep 2011	400	?	55.4; 8	33.0; 4	4.4; 0	3.2; 0	1.4; 0	22.4
PSOE	26 Aug 2011	?	?	? 8/9	? 3/4	? 0	? 0/1	–	?
2011 regional election	22 May 2011	—N/a	68.2	49.6; 8	29.9; 4	5.4; 0	4.6; 0	3.1; 0	19.7
Astel/PP	1–4 Sep 2009	170	?	? 7	? 5	? 0	–	–	?
2009 EP election	7 Jun 2009	—N/a	49.8	52.8; 7	37.6; 5	2.5; 0	0.6; 0	2.4; 0	15.2
2008 general election	9 Mar 2008	—N/a	78.7	52.4; 7	41.1; 5	2.3; 0	0.7; 0	0.7; 0	11.3

=== Almería ===
Color key:

Exit poll

Polling firm/Commissioner	Fieldwork date	Sample size	Turnout	PP	PSOE	IULV	UPyD	PA	Lead
2011 general election	20 Nov 2011	—N/a	67.2	57.6; 4	29.9; 2	5.3; 0	3.9; 0	0.8; 0	27.7
TNS Demoscopia/RTVE–FORTA	20 Nov 2011	?	?	56.6; 4	29.0; 2	–	–	–	27.6
Sigma Dos/El Mundo	28 Oct–10 Nov 2011	?	?	63.0– 64.0; 4/5	25.0– 26.0; 1/2	3.0– 4.0; 0	–	–	38.0
Metroscopia/El País	18 Oct–5 Nov 2011	?	?	? 4	? 2	–	–	–	?
DYM/ABC	24 Oct–3 Nov 2011	?	?	65.0; 4	27.7; 2	5.0; 0	–	–	37.3
Sigma Dos/El Mundo	27 Sep–27 Oct 2011	?	?	62.0– 63.0; 4	28.0– 29.0; 2	3.0– 4.0; 0	–	–	34.0
CIS	6–23 Oct 2011	267	?	? 4	? 2	–	–	–	?
PSOE	14 Sep 2011	?	?	? 4	? 2	–	–	–	?
2009 EP election	7 Jun 2009	—N/a	42.3	51.2; 3	40.6; 3	2.7; 0	1.7; 0	0.4; 0	10.6
2008 general election	9 Mar 2008	—N/a	72.8	49.9; 3	42.0; 3	2.7; 0	0.6; 0	0.5; 0	7.9

=== Badajoz ===
Color key:

Exit poll

Polling firm/Commissioner	Fieldwork date	Sample size	Turnout	PSOE	PP	IU–LV	UPyD	Lead
2011 general election	20 Nov 2011	—N/a	74.3	37.6; 2	50.6; 4	6.0; 0	3.5; 0	13.0
TNS Demoscopia/RTVE–FORTA	20 Nov 2011	?	?	39.0; 3	47.8; 3	–	–	8.8
Sigma Dos/El Mundo	28 Oct–10 Nov 2011	?	?	35.0– 36.0; 2	54.0– 55.0; 4	4.0– 5.0; 0	–	19.0
Metroscopia/El País	18 Oct–8 Nov 2011	?	?	? 2/3	? 3/4	–	–	?
DYM/ABC	24 Oct–3 Nov 2011	?	?	41.6; 3	48.6; 3	2.4; 0	4.3; 0	7.0
Sigma Dos/El Mundo	27 Sep–27 Oct 2011	?	?	35.0– 36.0; 2	53.0– 54.0; 4	5.0– 6.0; 0	–	18.0
CIS	6–23 Oct 2011	270	?	? 3	? 3	–	–	Tie
2011 regional election	22 May 2011	—N/a	74.7	44.7; 3	45.0; 3	6.2; 0	1.0; 0	0.3
2009 EP election	7 Jun 2009	—N/a	50.2	48.5; 3	44.2; 3	2.7; 0	2.0; 0	4.3
2008 general election	9 Mar 2008	—N/a	78.6	52.3; 3	41.8; 3	3.1; 0	0.8; 0	10.5

=== Barcelona ===
Color key:

Exit poll

Polling firm/Commissioner	Fieldwork date	Sample size	Turnout	PSC	CiU	PP	ERC	ICV–EUiA	C's	UPyD	SI	Lead
2011 general election	20 Nov 2011	—N/a	65.9	27.8; 10	27.2; 9	20.9; 7	6.5; 2	9.1; 3	–	1.3; 0	–	0.6
TNS Demoscopia/RTVE–FORTA	20 Nov 2011	?	?	31.5; 11/12	22.7; 7/8	19.5; 7	6.9; 2	9.1; 3	–	–	–	8.8
Sigma Dos/El Mundo	28 Oct–10 Nov 2011	?	?	31.0– 32.0; 10/11	25.0– 26.0; 8/9	24.0– 25.0; 8	6.0– 7.0; 2	6.0– 7.0; 2	–	–	–	6.0
Metroscopia/El País	18 Oct–7 Nov 2011	800	?	? 10	? 8	? 9	? 2	? 2	–	–	–	?
DYM/ABC	24 Oct–3 Nov 2011	?	?	38.3; 12/13	22.2; 7	25.1; 8/9	7.9; 2	5.1; 1	–	1.4; 0	–	13.2
Sigma Dos/El Mundo	27 Sep–27 Oct 2011	?	?	34.0– 35.0; 12	21.0– 22.0; 7/8	24.0– 25.0; 8/9	4.0– 5.0; 1	6.0– 7.0; 2	–	–	–	10.0
CIS	6–23 Oct 2011	797	?	? 11	? 7	? 8	? 2	? 3	–	–	–	?
Feedback/CiU	18–22 Jul 2011	?	?	? 11	? 9	? 8	? 1	? 2	–	–	–	?
2010 regional election	28 Nov 2010	—N/a	58.9	19.2; 7	36.8; 13	12.9; 4	6.4; 2	8.3; 3	3.8; 1	0.2; 0	3.1; 1	17.6
2009 EP election	7 Jun 2009	—N/a	37.5	37.4; 13	20.8; 7	18.5; 6	8.3; 3	6.7; 2	0.4; 0	0.9; 0	–	16.6
2008 general election	9 Mar 2008	—N/a	70.7	46.8; 16	19.6; 6	16.8; 6	6.6; 2	5.6; 1	0.9; 0	0.2; 0	–	27.2

=== Biscay ===
Color key:

Exit poll

Polling firm/Commissioner	Fieldwork date	Sample size	Turnout	PSE–EE	PNV	PP	IU–LV	EA	Aralar	UPyD	Bildu	Amaiur	Lead
2011 general election	20 Nov 2011	—N/a	68.1	21.4; 2	32.6; 3	17.7; 1	3.8; 0			1.7; 0		19.2; 2	11.2
TNS Demoscopia/RTVE–FORTA	20 Nov 2011	?	?	25.7; 2	28.4; 2/3	17.6; 1/2	–			–		18.5; 1/2	2.7
Sigma Dos/El Mundo	28 Oct–10 Nov 2011	?	?	22.0– 23.0; 2	33.0– 34.0; 3	20.0– 21.0; 2	2.0– 3.0; 0			–		13.0– 14.0; 1	11.0
Metroscopia/El País	18 Oct–9 Nov 2011	500	?	? 2	? 3	? 2	–			–		? 1	?
CIES/Grupo Noticias	2–8 Nov 2011	800	?	24.9; 2	29.2; 2/3	17.3; 1/2	4.6; 0			1.3; 0		21.5; 2	4.3
Ikertalde/GPS	26 Oct–4 Nov 2011	1,134	71.8	22.0; 2	29.4; 3	21.0; 2	3.0; 0			0.3; 0		19.1; 1	7.4
DYM/ABC	24 Oct–3 Nov 2011	?	?	21.0; 2	27.5; 2/3	21.5; 2	6.3; 0			–		18.8; 1/2	6.0
Gizaker/Grupo Noticias	26–28 Oct 2011	700	?	19.0; 1	31.6; 3	22.5; 2	–			–		24.0; 2	7.6
Invesco/Gara	10–27 Oct 2011	400	74.3	23.9; 2	31.1; 3	17.0; 1	–			–		22.8; 2	7.2
Sigma Dos/El Mundo	27 Sep–27 Oct 2011	?	?	22.0– 23.0; 2	29.0– 30.0; 3	21.0– 22.0; 2	4.0– 5.0; 0			–		16.0– 17.0; 1	7.0
CIS	6–23 Oct 2011	417	?	? 3	? 2	? 2	–			–		? 1	?
2011 foral elections	22 May 2011	—N/a	64.0	16.7; 1	37.2; 4	13.8; 1	3.5; 0		2.7; 0	0.6; 0	21.0; 2	–	16.2
2009 EP election	7 Jun 2009	—N/a	43.0	27.8; 3	32.9; 3	15.9; 1	1.9; 0	4.4; 0		1.5; 0	13.0; 1	–	5.1
2009 regional election	1 Mar 2009	—N/a	66.3	30.2; 3	41.1; 4	13.9; 1	3.4; 0	2.9; 0	4.2; 0	1.9; 0	–	–	10.9
2008 general election	9 Mar 2008	—N/a	66.6	37.0; 4	31.1; 3	18.4; 1	4.4; 0	3.1; 0	1.5; 0	1.0; 0	–	–	5.9

=== Cáceres ===
Color key:

Exit poll

Polling firm/Commissioner	Fieldwork date	Sample size	Turnout	PSOE	PP	IU–LV	UPyD	Lead
2011 general election	20 Nov 2011	—N/a	73.3	36.5; 2	52.0; 2	5.3; 0	3.4; 0	15.5
TNS Demoscopia/RTVE–FORTA	20 Nov 2011	?	?	38.8; 2	49.4; 2	–	–	10.6
Sigma Dos/El Mundo	28 Oct–10 Nov 2011	?	?	35.0– 36.0; 1/2	54.0– 55.0; 2/3	3.0– 4.0; 0	–	19.0
Metroscopia/El País	18 Oct–8 Nov 2011	?	?	? 1	? 3	–	–	?
DYM/ABC	24 Oct–3 Nov 2011	?	?	38.9; 1/2	61.1; 2/3	–	–	22.2
Sigma Dos/El Mundo	27 Sep–27 Oct 2011	?	?	35.0– 36.0; 1/2	53.0– 54.0; 2/3	5.0– 6.0; 0	–	18.0
CIS	6–23 Oct 2011	270	?	? 1	? 3	–	–	?
2011 regional election	22 May 2011	—N/a	74.6	41.4; 2	47.9; 2	5.0; 0	1.2; 0	6.5
2009 EP election	7 Jun 2009	—N/a	51.1	48.8; 2	44.1; 2	2.3; 0	1.6; 0	4.7
2008 general election	9 Mar 2008	—N/a	78.5	52.2; 2	41.9; 2	2.7; 0	0.8; 0	10.3

=== Cádiz ===
Color key:

Exit poll

Polling firm/Commissioner	Fieldwork date	Sample size	Turnout	PSOE	PP	IULV	PA	UPyD	Lead
2011 general election	20 Nov 2011	—N/a	63.8	32.8; 3	47.1; 5	8.7; 0	3.1; 0	4.8; 0	14.3
TNS Demoscopia/RTVE–FORTA	20 Nov 2011	?	?	31.7; 3	47.2; 4/5	9.0; 0/1	–	–	15.5
Sigma Dos/El Mundo	28 Oct–10 Nov 2011	?	?	33.0– 34.0; 3	51.0– 52.0; 5	7.0– 8.0; 0	–	–	18.0
Metroscopia/El País	18 Oct–5 Nov 2011	?	?	? 3/4	? 4/5	–	–	–	?
DYM/ABC	24 Oct–3 Nov 2011	?	?	47.1; 4	45.0; 4	4.8; 0	–	1.0; 0	2.1
Sigma Dos/El Mundo	27 Sep–27 Oct 2011	?	?	37.0– 38.0; 3	50.0– 51.0; 5	7.0– 8.0; 0	–	–	23.0
CIS	6–23 Oct 2011	357	?	? 3	? 5	–	–	–	?
PSOE	14 Sep 2011	?	?	? 3	? 5	–	–	–	?
2009 EP election	7 Jun 2009	—N/a	34.3	46.7; 5	39.8; 4	4.8; 0	1.6; 0	2.9; 0	6.9
2008 general election	9 Mar 2008	—N/a	67.4	51.1; 5	38.2; 4	4.8; 0	2.5; 0	0.9; 0	12.9

=== Castellón ===
Color key:

Exit poll

Polling firm/Commissioner	Fieldwork date	Sample size	Turnout	PP	PSOE	IU–LV	Bloc Compromís	UPyD	Lead
2011 general election	20 Nov 2011	—N/a	72.7	52.8; 3	29.6; 2	5.3; 0	4.0; 0	4.0; 0	23.2
TNS Demoscopia/RTVE–FORTA	20 Nov 2011	?	?	50.7; 3	31.4; 2	–	–	–	19.3
Sigma Dos/El Mundo	28 Oct–10 Nov 2011	?	?	56.0– 57.0; 3	32.0– 33.0; 2	4.0– 5.0; 0	0.0– 1.0; 0	–	24.0
Metroscopia/El País	18 Oct–8 Nov 2011	?	?	? 3	? 2	–	–	–	?
DYM/ABC	24 Oct–3 Nov 2011	?	?	59.1; 3	38.9; 2	0.7; 0	–	0.6; 0	20.2
Sigma Dos/El Mundo	27 Sep–27 Oct 2011	?	?	53.0– 54.0; 3	36.0– 37.0; 2	4.0– 5.0; 0	3.0– 4.0; 0	–	17.0
CIS	6–23 Oct 2011	269	?	? 3	? 2	–	–	–	?
Metroscopia/El País	3–4 Oct 2011	?	?	? 3	? 2	–	–	–	?
Astel/PP	1–14 Sep 2011	250	?	51.8; 3	35.5; 2	4.1; 0	4.5; 0	1.1; 0	16.3
PSOE	26 Aug 2011	?	?	? 3/4	? 1/2	–	–	–	?
2011 regional election	22 May 2011	—N/a	69.9	48.1; 3	31.0; 2	5.2; 0	6.7; 0	1.9; 0	17.1
Astel/PP	1–4 Sep 2009	130	?	? 3	? 2	–	–	–	?
2009 EP election	7 Jun 2009	—N/a	52.3	50.7; 3	39.5; 2	2.0; 0	1.4; 0	1.6; 0	11.2
2008 general election	9 Mar 2008	—N/a	77.8	49.0; 3	44.2; 2	2.1; 0	1.0; 0	0.6; 0	4.8

=== Ciudad Real ===
Color key:

Exit poll

Polling firm/Commissioner	Fieldwork date	Sample size	Turnout	PP	PSOE	IU–LV	UPyD	Lead
2011 general election	20 Nov 2011	—N/a	74.8	55.2; 3	32.0; 2	5.4; 0	4.4; 0	23.2
TNS Demoscopia/RTVE–FORTA	20 Nov 2011	?	?	51.8; 3	34.6; 2	–	–	17.2
Sigma Dos/El Mundo	28 Oct–10 Nov 2011	?	?	57.0– 58.0; 3	30.0– 31.0; 2	3.0– 4.0; 0	–	27.0
Metroscopia/El País	18 Oct–8 Nov 2011	?	?	? 3	? 2	–	–	?
DYM/ABC	24 Oct–3 Nov 2011	?	?	54.2; 3	44.9; 2	–	–	9.3
Sigma Dos/El Mundo	27 Sep–27 Oct 2011	?	?	56.0– 57.0; 3	33.0– 34.0; 2	3.0– 4.0; 0	–	23.0
CIS	6–23 Oct 2011	269	?	? 3	? 2	–	–	?
2011 regional election	22 May 2011	—N/a	74.9	46.1; 2	46.3; 3	3.3; 0	1.6; 0	0.2
2009 EP election	7 Jun 2009	—N/a	49.9	50.3; 3	42.0; 2	2.8; 0	2.2; 0	8.3
2008 general election	9 Mar 2008	—N/a	78.5	47.8; 3	46.8; 2	2.6; 0	0.8; 0	1.0

=== Córdoba ===
Color key:

Exit poll

Polling firm/Commissioner	Fieldwork date	Sample size	Turnout	PSOE	PP	IULV	PA	UPyD	Lead
2011 general election	20 Nov 2011	—N/a	72.7	36.4; 3	44.6; 3	9.8; 0	2.2; 0	3.8; 0	8.2
TNS Demoscopia/RTVE–FORTA	20 Nov 2011	?	?	35.3; 2/3	45.6; 3/4	–	–	–	10.3
Sigma Dos/El Mundo	28 Oct–10 Nov 2011	?	?	32.0– 33.0; 2	50.0– 51.0; 4	11.0– 12.0; 0	–	–	18.0
Metroscopia/El País	18 Oct–5 Nov 2011	?	?	? 2/3	? 3/4	–	–	–	?
DYM/ABC	24 Oct–3 Nov 2011	?	?	36.4; 2/3	58.6; 3/4	3.5; 0	–	1.5; 0	22.2
Sigma Dos/El Mundo	27 Sep–27 Oct 2011	?	?	36.0– 37.0; 2/3	48.0– 49.0; 3/4	10.0– 11.0; 0	–	–	12.0
CIS	6–23 Oct 2011	267	?	? 3	? 3	–	–	–	Tie
PSOE	14 Sep 2011	?	?	? 2/3	? 3	? 0/1	–	–	?
2009 EP election	7 Jun 2009	—N/a	46.0	47.4; 3	39.4; 3	6.8; 0	1.1; 0	1.9; 0	8.0
2008 general election	9 Mar 2008	—N/a	75.8	50.8; 4	37.6; 2	7.0; 0	1.6; 0	0.6; 0	13.2

=== Cuenca ===
Color key:

Exit poll

Polling firm/Commissioner	Fieldwork date	Sample size	Turnout	PP	PSOE	IU–LV	UPyD	Lead
2011 general election	20 Nov 2011	—N/a	77.6	55.9; 2	33.0; 1	4.8; 0	3.6; 0	22.9
TNS Demoscopia/RTVE–FORTA	20 Nov 2011	?	?	54.4; 2	33.4; 1	–	–	21.0
Sigma Dos/El Mundo	28 Oct–10 Nov 2011	?	?	59.0– 60.0; 2	29.0– 30.0; 1	2.0– 3.0; 0	–	30.0
Metroscopia/El País	18 Oct–8 Nov 2011	?	?	? 2	? 1	–	–	?
DYM/ABC	24 Oct–3 Nov 2011	?	?	57.0; 2	36.9; 1	2.6; 0	3.5; 0	20.1
Sigma Dos/El Mundo	27 Sep–27 Oct 2011	?	?	58.0– 59.0; 2	32.0– 33.0; 1	2.0– 3.0; 0	–	26.0
CIS	6–23 Oct 2011	255	?	? 2	? 1	–	–	?
2011 regional election	22 May 2011	—N/a	81.3	47.4; 2	46.6; 1	2.6; 0	1.4; 0	0.8
2009 EP election	7 Jun 2009	—N/a	57.4	52.2; 2	41.2; 1	2.3; 0	1.6; 0	11.0
2008 general election	9 Mar 2008	—N/a	81.5	49.8; 2	45.2; 1	2.4; 0	0.8; 0	4.6

=== Gipuzkoa ===
Color key:

Exit poll

Polling firm/Commissioner	Fieldwork date	Sample size	Turnout	PSE–EE	PNV	PP	EA	Aralar	IU–LV	UPyD	Bildu	Amaiur	Lead
2011 general election	20 Nov 2011	—N/a	67.3	21.0; 1	22.4; 1	13.7; 1			3.4; 0	1.5; 0		34.8; 3	12.4
TNS Demoscopia/RTVE–FORTA	20 Nov 2011	?	?	24.2; 1/2	16.5; 1	15.0; 1			–	–		32.8; 2/3	8.6
Sigma Dos/El Mundo	28 Oct–10 Nov 2011	?	?	27.0– 28.0; 2	24.0– 25.0; 1	15.0– 16.0; 1			3.0– 4.0; 0	–		24.0– 25.0; 2	3.0
Metroscopia/El País	18 Oct–9 Nov 2011	500	?	? 2	? 1	? 1			–	–		? 2	Tie
CIES/Deia	2–8 Nov 2011	800	?	24.4; 1/2	23.9; 1/2	15.8; 1			3.2; 0	1.0; 0		30.1; 2/3	5.7
Ikertalde/GPS	26 Oct–4 Nov 2011	616	70.5	21.8; 1/2	19.0; 1	15.0; 1			2.1; 0	0.5; 0		36.3; 2/3	14.5
DYM/ABC	24 Oct–3 Nov 2011	?	?	28.2; 2	19.4; 1	18.1; 1			3.4; 0	–		27.6; 2	0.6
Gizaker/Grupo Noticias	26–28 Oct 2011	550	?	16.0; 1	24.9; 1/2	16.2; 1			–	–		37.5; 2/3	12.6
Invesco/Gara	10–27 Oct 2011	400	72.5	20.6; 1	19.2; 1	14.2; 1			–	–		42.6; 3	22.0
Sigma Dos/El Mundo	27 Sep–27 Oct 2011	?	?	25.0– 26.0; 2	20.0– 21.0; 1	18.0– 19.0; 1			2.0– 3.0; 0	–		26.0– 27.0; 2	1.0
CIS	6–23 Oct 2011	385	?	? 2	? 1	? 1			–	–		? 2	Tie
2011 foral elections	22 May 2011	—N/a	62.7	17.2; 1	23.5; 2	10.0; 0		5.0; 0	2.6; 0	0.7; 0	34.6; 3	–	11.1
2009 EP election	7 Jun 2009	—N/a	39.1	26.2; 2	24.5; 2	12.0; 1	8.3; 0		1.7; 0	1.2; 0	23.7; 1	–	1.7
2009 regional election	1 Mar 2009	—N/a	61.8	30.2; 2	36.5; 3	10.5; 1	5.2; 0	10.2; 0	3.7; 0	1.7; 0	–	–	6.3
2008 general election	9 Mar 2008	—N/a	57.4	39.0; 3	23.8; 2	14.6; 1	7.8; 0	5.3; 0	4.8; 0	0.8; 0	–	–	15.2

=== Girona ===
Color key:

Exit poll

Polling firm/Commissioner	Fieldwork date	Sample size	Turnout	PSC	CiU	ERC	PP	ICV–EUiA	C's	UPyD	SI	Lead
2011 general election	20 Nov 2011	—N/a	62.4	21.4; 1	39.2; 3	10.8; 1	16.2; 1	5.5; 0	–	0.6; 0	–	17.8
TNS Demoscopia/RTVE–FORTA	20 Nov 2011	?	?	24.5; 1/2	33.6; 2/3	13.3; 1	14.5; 1	–	–	–	–	9.1
Sigma Dos/El Mundo	28 Oct–10 Nov 2011	?	?	26.0– 27.0; 2	27.0– 28.0; 2	8.0– 9.0; 0	22.0– 23.0; 2	4.0– 5.0; 0	–	–	–	1.0
Metroscopia/El País	18 Oct–7 Nov 2011	300	?	? 2	? 2	? 1	? 1	–	–	–	–	Tie
DYM/ABC	24 Oct–3 Nov 2011	?	?	29.7; 2	35.0; 2/3	9.9; 0	21.3; 1/2	4.1; 0	–	0.1; 0	–	5.3
Sigma Dos/El Mundo	27 Sep–27 Oct 2011	?	?	26.0– 27.0; 2	28.0– 29.0; 2	9.0– 10.0; 0	26.0– 27.0; 2	3.0– 4.0; 0	–	–	–	2.0
CIS	6–23 Oct 2011	381	?	? 2	? 2	? 1	? 1	–	–	–	–	Tie
Feedback/CiU	18–22 Jul 2011	?	?	? 2	? 3	? 1	? 0	–	–	–	–	?
2010 regional election	28 Nov 2010	—N/a	59.5	14.3; 1	45.1; 4	9.2; 1	8.6; 0	4.8; 0	1.7; 0	0.1; 0	4.7; 0	30.8
2009 EP election	7 Jun 2009	—N/a	34.6	29.7; 2	30.0; 2	13.4; 1	13.3; 1	4.7; 0	0.2; 0	0.4; 0	–	0.3
2008 general election	9 Mar 2008	—N/a	68.8	39.5; 3	27.2; 2	13.2; 1	12.2; 0	3.2; 0	0.3; 0	0.1; 0	–	12.3

=== Granada ===
Color key:

Exit poll

Polling firm/Commissioner	Fieldwork date	Sample size	Turnout	PSOE	PP	IULV	UPyD	PA	Lead
2011 general election	20 Nov 2011	—N/a	69.9	36.5; 3	46.7; 4	7.9; 0	5.2; 0	0.8; 0	10.2
TNS Demoscopia/RTVE–FORTA	20 Nov 2011	?	?	34.6; 3	48.5; 4	–	–	–	13.9
Sigma Dos/El Mundo	28 Oct–10 Nov 2011	?	?	31.0– 32.0; 2	54.0– 55.0; 5	7.0– 8.0; 0	–	–	23.0
Metroscopia/El País	18 Oct–5 Nov 2011	?	?	? 3	? 4	–	–	–	?
DYM/ABC	24 Oct–3 Nov 2011	?	?	34.8; 2	47.7; 3	5.7; 0	9.6; 0	–	12.9
Sigma Dos/El Mundo	27 Sep–27 Oct 2011	?	?	35.0– 36.0; 3	52.0– 53.0; 4	7.0– 8.0; 0	–	–	17.0
CIS	6–23 Oct 2011	353	?	? 2	? 5	–	–	–	17.0
PSOE	14 Sep 2011	?	?	? 2/3	? 4/5	–	–	–	?
2009 EP election	7 Jun 2009	—N/a	45.0	47.1; 4	41.9; 3	4.9; 0	2.6; 0	0.6; 0	5.2
2008 general election	9 Mar 2008	—N/a	74.3	50.0; 4	41.1; 3	5.0; 0	1.0; 0	0.9; 0	8.9

=== Guadalajara ===
Color key:

Exit poll

Polling firm/Commissioner	Fieldwork date	Sample size	Turnout	PP	PSOE	IU–LV	UPyD	Lead
2011 general election	20 Nov 2011	—N/a	74.8	54.0; 2	27.7; 1	6.8; 0	7.5; 0	26.3
TNS Demoscopia/RTVE–FORTA	20 Nov 2011	?	?	51.9; 2	30.0; 1	–	–	21.9
Sigma Dos/El Mundo	28 Oct–10 Nov 2011	?	?	58.0– 59.0; 2	25.0– 26.0; 1	4.0– 5.0; 0	–	33.0
Metroscopia/El País	18 Oct–8 Nov 2011	?	?	? 2	? 1	–	–	?
DYM/ABC	24 Oct–3 Nov 2011	?	?	52.8; 2	38.7; 1	3.4; 0	2.2; 0	14.1
Sigma Dos/El Mundo	27 Sep–27 Oct 2011	?	?	57.0– 58.0; 2	28.0– 29.0; 1	4.0– 5.0; 0	–	29.0
CIS	6–23 Oct 2011	247	?	? 2	? 1	–	–	?
2011 regional election	22 May 2011	—N/a	73.4	49.8; 2	38.0; 1	4.7; 0	3.0; 0	11.8
2009 EP election	7 Jun 2009	—N/a	51.4	51.4; 2	36.3; 1	3.5; 0	4.8; 0	15.1
2008 general election	9 Mar 2008	—N/a	79.9	50.7; 2	41.0; 1	3.3; 0	2.1; 0	9.7

=== Huelva ===
Color key:

Exit poll

Polling firm/Commissioner	Fieldwork date	Sample size	Turnout	PSOE	PP	IULV	PA	UPyD	Lead
2011 general election	20 Nov 2011	—N/a	67.9	40.5; 2	43.9; 3	7.0; 0	1.9; 0	3.4; 0	3.4
TNS Demoscopia/RTVE–FORTA	20 Nov 2011	?	?	41.3; 2/3	41.8; 2/3	–	–	–	0.5
Sigma Dos/El Mundo	28 Oct–10 Nov 2011	?	?	36.0– 37.0; 2	48.0– 49.0; 4	8.0– 9.0; 0	–	–	12.0
Metroscopia/El País	18 Oct–5 Nov 2011	?	?	? 2	? 3	–	–	–	?
DYM/ABC	24 Oct–3 Nov 2011	?	?	52.0; 3	34.4; 2	10.9; 0	–	–	17.6
Sigma Dos/El Mundo	27 Sep–27 Oct 2011	?	?	41.0– 42.0; 2	46.0– 47.0; 3	7.0– 8.0; 0	–	–	5.0
CIS	6–23 Oct 2011	270	?	? 2/3	? 2/3	–	–	–	Tie
PSOE	14 Sep 2011	?	?	? 2	? 3	–	–	–	?
2009 EP election	7 Jun 2009	—N/a	38.3	54.0; 3	35.5; 2	4.2; 0	1.2; 0	1.9; 0	18.5
2008 general election	9 Mar 2008	—N/a	69.9	55.7; 3	35.0; 2	4.9; 0	1.5; 0	0.9; 0	20.7

=== Jaén ===
Color key:

Exit poll

Polling firm/Commissioner	Fieldwork date	Sample size	Turnout	PSOE	PP	IULV	PA	UPyD	Lead
2011 general election	20 Nov 2011	—N/a	75.9	41.0; 3	45.4; 3	7.0; 0	1.2; 0	3.4; 0	4.4
TNS Demoscopia/RTVE–FORTA	20 Nov 2011	?	?	42.5; 3	43.5; 3	–	–	–	1.0
Sigma Dos/El Mundo	28 Oct–10 Nov 2011	?	?	36.0– 37.0; 2/3	49.0– 50.0; 3/4	8.0– 9.0; 0	–	–	13.0
Metroscopia/El País	18 Oct–5 Nov 2011	?	?	? 3	? 3	–	–	–	Tie
DYM/ABC	24 Oct–3 Nov 2011	?	?	48.6; 3	47.1; 3	4.3; 0	–	–	1.5
Sigma Dos/El Mundo	27 Sep–27 Oct 2011	?	?	40.0– 41.0; 3	48.0– 49.0; 3	7.0– 8.0; 0	–	–	8.0
CIS	6–23 Oct 2011	270	?	? 3	? 3	–	–	–	Tie
PSOE	14 Sep 2011	?	?	? 2/3	? 3/4	–	–	–	?
2009 EP election	7 Jun 2009	—N/a	51.2	51.2; 3	39.0; 3	4.9; 0	0.9; 0	1.4; 0	12.2
2008 general election	9 Mar 2008	—N/a	78.6	55.5; 4	36.5; 2	4.8; 0	1.1; 0	0.5; 0	19.0

=== Lleida ===
Color key:

Exit poll

Polling firm/Commissioner	Fieldwork date	Sample size	Turnout	PSC	CiU	PP	ERC	ICV–EUiA	C's	UPyD	SI	Lead
2011 general election	20 Nov 2011	—N/a	62.5	20.3; 1	41.3; 2	19.4; 1	8.6; 0	3.9; 0	–	0.6; 0	–	21.0
TNS Demoscopia/RTVE–FORTA	20 Nov 2011	?	?	24.2; 1	37.3; 2	17.5; 1	–	–	–	–	–	13.1
Sigma Dos/El Mundo	28 Oct–10 Nov 2011	?	?	28.0– 29.0; 1/2	28.0– 29.0; 1/2	20.0– 21.0; 1	8.0– 9.0; 0	3.0– 4.0; 0	–	–	–	Tie
Metroscopia/El País	18 Oct–7 Nov 2011	300	?	? 1	? 2	? 1	? 0	–	–	–	–	?
DYM/ABC	24 Oct–3 Nov 2011	?	?	29.5; 1	33.1; 2	19.9; 1	11.4; 0	1.7; 0	–	0.0; 0	–	3.6
Sigma Dos/El Mundo	27 Sep–27 Oct 2011	?	?	32.0– 33.0; 2	28.0– 29.0; 1	21.0– 22.0; 1	8.0– 9.0; 0	2.0– 3.0; 0	–	–	–	4.0
CIS	6–23 Oct 2011	376	?	? 1	? 2	? 1	? 0	–	–	–	–	?
Feedback/CiU	18–22 Jul 2011	?	?	? 1	? 2	? 1	? 0	–	–	–	–	?
2010 regional election	28 Nov 2010	—N/a	59.9	14.8; 1	46.9; 3	10.2; 0	9.1; 0	4.0; 0	1.5; 0	0.1; 0	3.1; 0	32.1
2009 EP election	7 Jun 2009	—N/a	35.4	28.1; 1	31.0; 2	17.1; 1	12.1; 0	3.6; 0	0.2; 0	0.4; 0	–	2.9
2008 general election	9 Mar 2008	—N/a	69.0	37.2; 2	28.6; 1	15.0; 1	12.9; 0	2.6; 0	0.2; 0	0.1; 0	–	8.6

=== Lugo ===
Color key:

Exit poll

Polling firm/Commissioner	Fieldwork date	Sample size	Turnout	PP	PSdeG–PSOE	BNG	IU–LV	UPyD	Lead
2011 general election	20 Nov 2011	—N/a	62.8	56.1; 3	28.3; 1	9.2; 0	3.1; 0	0.9; 0	27.8
TNS Demoscopia/RTVE–FORTA	20 Nov 2011	?	?	56.3; 3	26.3; 1	–	–	–	30.0
Sondaxe/La Voz de Galicia	13 Nov 2011	?	?	57.3; 3	23.4; 1	9.8; 0	–	–	33.9
Ipsos/Faro de Vigo	13 Nov 2011	?	?	? 3	? 1	–	–	–	?
Sigma Dos/El Mundo	28 Oct–10 Nov 2011	?	?	52.0– 53.0; 3	29.0– 30.0; 1	8.0– 9.0; 0	4.0– 5.0; 0	–	23.0
Metroscopia/El País	18 Oct–8 Nov 2011	?	?	? 3	? 1	–	–	–	?
DYM/ABC	24 Oct–3 Nov 2011	?	?	52.5; 3	28.9; 1	7.3; 0	8.1; 0	3.1; 0	23.6
Sigma Dos/El Mundo	27 Sep–27 Oct 2011	?	?	50.0– 51.0; 3	30.0– 31.0; 1	11.0– 12.0; 0	2.0– 3.0; 0	–	20.0
CIS	6–23 Oct 2011	270	?	? 3	? 1	–	–	–	?
2009 EP election	7 Jun 2009	—N/a	41.3	52.8; 3	34.4; 1	8.2; 0	0.9; 0	0.8; 0	18.4
2009 regional election	1 Mar 2009	—N/a	63.0	47.8; 2	32.7; 2	14.6; 0	0.6; 0	1.1; 0	15.1
2008 general election	9 Mar 2008	—N/a	72.0	44.5; 2	41.4; 2	10.8; 0	1.0; 0	0.5; 0	3.1

=== Málaga ===
Color key:

Exit poll

Polling firm/Commissioner	Fieldwork date	Sample size	Turnout	PSOE	PP	IULV	PA	UPyD	Lead
2011 general election	20 Nov 2011	—N/a	65.1	31.6; 3	49.7; 6	9.0; 1	1.0; 0	5.6; 0	18.1
TNS Demoscopia/RTVE–FORTA	20 Nov 2011	?	?	33.4; 3/4	49.4; 5/6	8.7; 0/1	–	–	16.0
Sigma Dos/El Mundo	28 Oct–10 Nov 2011	?	?	27.0– 28.0; 3	55.0– 56.0; 7	6.0– 7.0; 0	–	–	28.0
Metroscopia/El País	18 Oct–5 Nov 2011	?	?	? 3	? 6	? 1	–	–	?
DYM/ABC	24 Oct–3 Nov 2011	?	?	36.7; 4	54.1; 5/6	8.2; 0/1	–	1.0; 0	17.4
Sigma Dos/El Mundo	27 Sep–27 Oct 2011	?	?	31.0– 32.0; 3/4	54.0– 55.0; 6/7	6.0– 7.0; 0	–	–	23.0
CIS	6–23 Oct 2011	424	?	? 3	? 7	? 0	–	–	?
PSOE	14 Sep 2011	?	?	? 3/4	? 6	? 0/1	–	–	?
2009 EP election	7 Jun 2009	—N/a	39.3	43.7; 5	43.5; 5	5.5; 0	0.8; 0	3.0; 0	0.2
2008 general election	9 Mar 2008	—N/a	71.4	47.0; 5	43.0; 5	5.1; 0	1.5; 0	1.0; 0	4.0

=== Ourense ===
Color key:

Exit poll

Polling firm/Commissioner	Fieldwork date	Sample size	Turnout	PP	PSdeG–PSOE	BNG	IU–LV	UPyD	Lead
2011 general election	20 Nov 2011	—N/a	57.1	56.7; 3	28.1; 1	9.3; 0	2.3; 0	0.8; 0	28.6
TNS Demoscopia/RTVE–FORTA	20 Nov 2011	?	?	52.1; 3	29.0; 1	–	–	–	23.1
Sondaxe/La Voz de Galicia	13 Nov 2011	?	?	55.7; 3	33.5; 1	9.0; 0	–	–	22.2
Ipsos/Faro de Vigo	13 Nov 2011	?	?	? 3	? 1	–	–	–	?
Sigma Dos/El Mundo	28 Oct–10 Nov 2011	?	?	55.0– 56.0; 3	28.0– 29.0; 1	8.0– 9.0; 0	3.0– 4.0; 0	–	27.0
Metroscopia/El País	18 Oct–8 Nov 2011	?	?	? 3	? 1	–	–	–	?
DYM/ABC	24 Oct–3 Nov 2011	?	?	50.2; 2/3	42.9; 1/2	–	5.8; 0	–	7.3
Sigma Dos/El Mundo	27 Sep–27 Oct 2011	?	?	53.0– 54.0; 3	28.0– 29.0; 1	11.0– 12.0; 0	2.0– 3.0; 0	–	25.0
CIS	6–23 Oct 2011	269	?	? 3	? 1	–	–	–	?
2009 EP election	7 Jun 2009	—N/a	46.3	54.1; 3	34.1; 1	7.7; 0	0.8; 0	0.7; 0	20.0
2009 regional election	1 Mar 2009	—N/a	64.1	48.5; 3	31.9; 1	16.0; 0	0.5; 0	0.7; 0	16.6
2008 general election	9 Mar 2008	—N/a	68.6	47.3; 2	39.0; 2	10.8; 0	0.7; 0	0.5; 0	8.3

=== Pontevedra ===
Color key:

Exit poll

Polling firm/Commissioner	Fieldwork date	Sample size	Turnout	PP	PSdeG–PSOE	BNG	IU–LV	UPyD	Lead
2011 general election	20 Nov 2011	—N/a	63.9	50.8; 4	28.1; 2	12.0; 1	4.6; 0	1.3; 0	22.7
TNS Demoscopia/RTVE–FORTA	20 Nov 2011	?	?	47.6; 4	28.7; 2	12.4; 1	–	–	18.9
Sondaxe/La Voz de Galicia	13 Nov 2011	?	?	50.5; 4	33.5; 3	10.0; 0	–	–	17.0
Ipsos/Faro de Vigo	13 Nov 2011	?	?	? 4	? 2	? 1	–	–	?
Sigma Dos/El Mundo	28 Oct–10 Nov 2011	?	?	51.0– 52.0; 4	29.0– 30.0; 2	11.0– 12.0; 1	2.0– 3.0; 0	–	22.0
Metroscopia/El País	18 Oct–8 Nov 2011	?	?	? 4	? 2	? 1	–	–	?
DYM/ABC	24 Oct–3 Nov 2011	?	?	51.2; 4	28.1; 2	13.9; 1	–	6.7; 0	23.1
Sigma Dos/El Mundo	27 Sep–27 Oct 2011	?	?	48.0– 49.0; 4	32.0– 33.0; 2	11.0– 12.0; 1	2.0– 3.0; 0	–	16.0
CIS	6–23 Oct 2011	415	?	? 4	? 2	? 1	–	–	?
2009 EP election	7 Jun 2009	—N/a	43.4	48.8; 4	35.6; 3	9.6; 0	1.5; 0	1.2; 0	13.2
2009 regional election	1 Mar 2009	—N/a	65.3	46.9; 4	30.5; 2	16.9; 1	1.1; 0	1.5; 0	16.4
2008 general election	9 Mar 2008	—N/a	71.3	43.7; 3	40.5; 3	11.5; 1	1.6; 0	0.5; 0	3.2

=== Tarragona ===
Color key:

Exit poll

Polling firm/Commissioner	Fieldwork date	Sample size	Turnout	PSC	CiU	PP	ERC	ICV–EUiA	C's	UPyD	SI	Lead
2011 general election	20 Nov 2011	—N/a	63.7	26.1; 2	30.5; 2	23.6; 2	7.4; 0	5.4; 0	–	1.1; 0	–	4.4
TNS Demoscopia/RTVE–FORTA	20 Nov 2011	?	?	29.0; 2	23.4; 2	22.5; 2	–	–	–	–	–	5.6
Sigma Dos/El Mundo	28 Oct–10 Nov 2011	?	?	31.0– 32.0; 2	21.0– 22.0; 2	25.0– 26.0; 2	6.0– 7.0; 0	5.0– 6.0; 0	–	–	–	6.0
Metroscopia/El País	18 Oct–7 Nov 2011	300	?	? 2	? 2	? 2	? 0	–	–	–	–	Tie
DYM/ABC	24 Oct–3 Nov 2011	?	?	35.1; 3	21.8; 1/2	21.5; 1/2	10.6; 0	8.3; 0	–	0.0; 0	–	13.3
Sigma Dos/El Mundo	27 Sep–27 Oct 2011	?	?	33.0– 34.0; 2	23.0– 24.0; 2	26.0– 27.0; 2	6.0– 7.0; 0	4.0– 5.0; 0	–	–	–	7.0
CIS	6–23 Oct 2011	383	?	? 2	? 2	? 2	? 0	–	–	–	–	Tie
Feedback/CiU	18–22 Jul 2011	?	?	? 2	? 2	? 2	? 0	–	–	–	–	Tie
2010 regional election	28 Nov 2010	—N/a	56.8	18.2; 1	39.3; 4	13.4; 1	8.5; 0	5.1; 0	2.7; 0	0.1; 0	3.4; 0	21.1
2009 EP election	7 Jun 2009	—N/a	36.0	34.9; 3	23.6; 2	19.2; 1	10.7; 0	3.8; 0	0.3; 0	0.7; 0	–	11.3
2008 general election	9 Mar 2008	—N/a	69.9	44.9; 4	21.1; 1	17.8; 1	9.4; 0	3.0; 0	0.5; 0	0.1; 0	–	23.8

=== Seville ===
Color key:

Exit poll

Polling firm/Commissioner	Fieldwork date	Sample size	Turnout	PSOE	PP	IULV	PA	UPyD	eQuo	Lead
2011 general election	20 Nov 2011	—N/a	71.2	41.7; 6	38.7; 5	8.6; 1	2.2; 0	5.5; 0	1.1; 0	3.0
TNS Demoscopia/RTVE–FORTA	20 Nov 2011	?	?	40.7; 5/6	39.6; 5/6	7.7; 0/1	–	–	–	1.1
Sigma Dos/El Mundo	28 Oct–10 Nov 2011	?	?	39.0– 40.0; 5	43.0– 44.0; 6	7.0– 8.0; 1	–	–	–	4.0
Metroscopia/El País	18 Oct–5 Nov 2011	?	?	? 5	? 6	? 1	–	–	–	?
DYM/ABC	24 Oct–3 Nov 2011	?	?	45.8; 6	41.1; 5	9.7; 1	–	1.6; 0	0.8; 0	4.7
Sigma Dos/El Mundo	27 Sep–27 Oct 2011	?	?	43.0– 44.0; 6	41.0– 42.0; 5	7.0– 8.0; 1	–	–	–	2.0
CIS	6–23 Oct 2011	425	?	? 6	? 5	? 1	–	–	–	?
PSOE	14 Sep 2011	?	?	? 4/5	? 7	? 0/1	–	–	–	?
2009 EP election	7 Jun 2009	—N/a	42.3	52.6; 7	33.6; 5	5.7; 0	1.2; 0	3.2; 0	–	19.0
2008 general election	9 Mar 2008	—N/a	73.8	58.1; 8	31.5; 4	5.4; 0	1.7; 0	1.2; 0	–	26.6

=== Valencia ===
Color key:

Exit poll

Polling firm/Commissioner	Fieldwork date	Sample size	Turnout	PP	PSOE	IU–LV	Bloc Compromís	UPyD	Lead
2011 general election	20 Nov 2011	—N/a	74.9	52.2; 9	26.0; 4	6.8; 1	6.0; 1	5.9; 1	26.2
TNS Demoscopia/RTVE–FORTA	20 Nov 2011	?	?	51.0; 9/10	25.6; 4/5	7.0; 1	6.0; 0/1	5.5; 0/1	25.4
Sigma Dos/El Mundo	28 Oct–10 Nov 2011	?	?	56.0– 57.0; 10	25.0– 26.0; 4/5	6.0– 7.0; 1	5.0– 6.0; 0/1	–	31.0
Metroscopia/El País	18 Oct–8 Nov 2011	?	?	? 9	? 5	? 1	? 1	–	?
DYM/ABC	24 Oct–3 Nov 2011	?	?	57.2; 9/10	31.5; 5/6	4.2; 0	5.5; 1	0.4; 0	25.7
Sigma Dos/El Mundo	27 Sep–27 Oct 2011	?	?	54.0– 55.0; 9	29.0– 30.0; 5	6.0– 7.0; 1	5.0– 6.0; 1	–	25.0
CIS	6–23 Oct 2011	425	?	? 9	? 5	? 1	? 1	–	?
Metroscopia/El País	3–4 Oct 2011	?	?	? 9	? 5	? 1	? 1	–	?
Astel/PP	1–14 Sep 2011	550	?	52.9; 9	31.3; 5	5.9; 1	5.7; 1	1.8; 0	21.6
PSOE	26 Aug 2011	?	?	? 10/11	? 4/5	? 0	? 1/2	–	?
2011 regional election	22 May 2011	—N/a	71.5	49.6; 9	26.3; 5	6.4; 1	8.9; 1	2.2; 0	23.3
Astel/PP	1–4 Sep 2009	220	?	? 10	? 6	? 0	? 0	–	?
2009 EP election	7 Jun 2009	—N/a	54.8	52.2; 9	37.2; 7	3.2; 0	1.1; 0	2.1; 0	15.0
2008 general election	9 Mar 2008	—N/a	79.1	51.6; 9	40.2; 7	3.1; 0	1.3; 0	0.7; 0	11.4
