= 2011 Aragonese regional election =

Election in the Spanish region of Aragon

- 22 May 2011

All 67 seats in the Cortes of Aragon 34 seats needed for a majority
- Opinion polls
- Registered: 1,016,021 ▼0.1%
- Turnout: 689,904 (67.9%) ▲1.4 pp
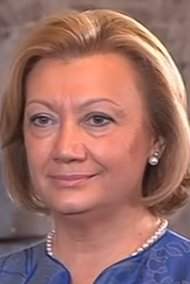

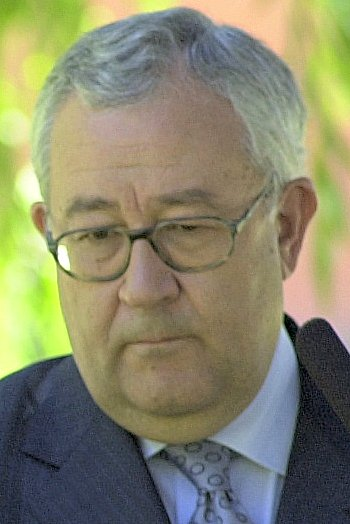

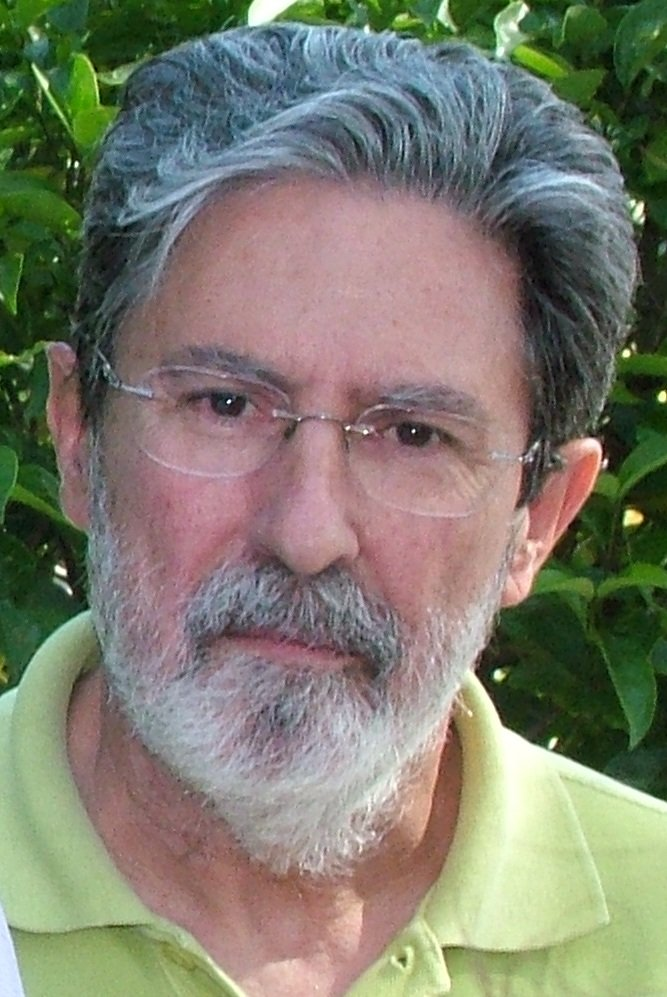
	First party	Second party	Third party
Leader	Luisa Fernanda Rudi	Eva Almunia	José Ángel Biel
Party	PP	PSOE	PAR
Leader since	8 November 2008	10 September 2010	2 June 2000
Leader's seat	Zaragoza	Zaragoza	Teruel
Last election	23 seats, 31.1%	30 seats, 41.1%	9 seats, 12.1%
Seats won	30	22	7
Seat change	▲7	▼8	▼2
Popular vote	269,729	197,189	62,193
Percentage	39.7%	29.0%	9.2%
Swing	▲8.6 pp	▼12.1 pp	▼2.9 pp
	Fourth party	Fifth party
Leader	Nieves Ibeas	Adolfo Barrena
Party	CHA	IU
Leader since	12 January 2008	May 2002
Leader's seat	Zaragoza	Zaragoza
Last election	4 seats, 8.1%	1 seat, 4.1%
Seats won	4	4
Seat change	0	▲3
Popular vote	55,932	41,874
Percentage	8.2%	6.2%
Swing	▲0.1 pp	▲2.1 pp
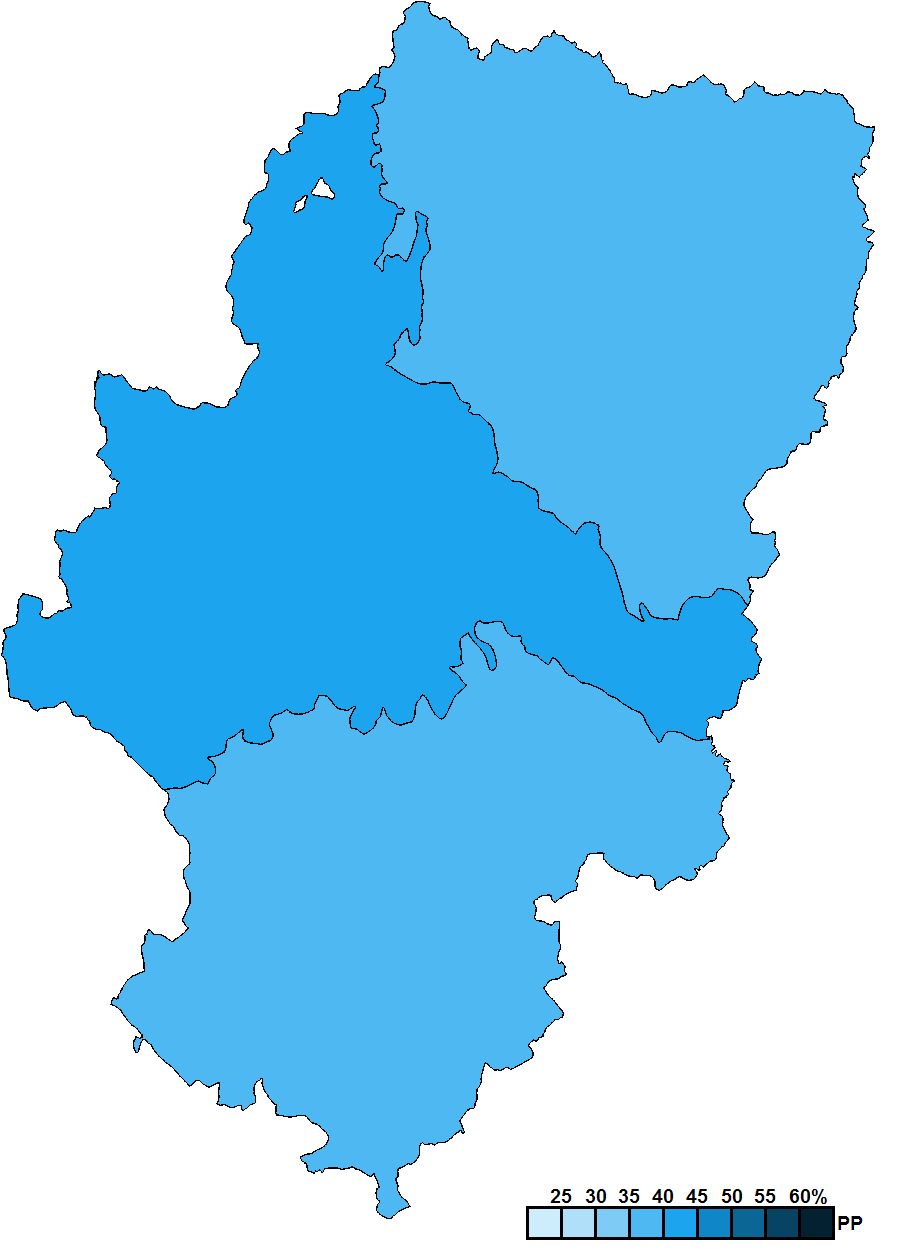
- Constituency results map for the Cortes of Aragon
President before election
Marcelino Iglesias
PSOE
President after election
Luisa Fernanda Rudi
PP

A regional election was held in Aragon on 22 May 2011 to elect the 8th Cortes of the autonomous community. All 67 seats in the Cortes were up for election. It was held concurrently with regional elections in twelve other autonomous communities and local elections all across Spain.

The outgoing Spanish Socialist Workers' Party (PSOE) administration suffered a serious defeat after losing nearly 30% of its 2007 vote. The opposition People's Party (PP) obtained the best result of its history in the region, though it remained four seats short for an absolute majority. This was the first time since the 1999 election that the PP had received the most votes in Aragon. United Left (IU) had its best result since 1995, gaining three seats. The Aragonese Party (PAR), on the other hand, obtained its worst historical result up until that point, while the Aragonese Union (CHA) remained static at its 2007 result.

As a result of the election, Luisa Fernanda Rudi from the People's Party was elected President of Aragon as part of a PP–PAR coalition agreement. The PAR had been previously the PSOE coalition partner from 1999 to 2011.

== Overview ==
Under the 2007 Statute of Autonomy, the Cortes of Aragon was the unicameral legislature of the homonymous autonomous community, having legislative power in devolved matters, as well as the ability to grant or withdraw confidence from a regional president. The electoral and procedural rules were supplemented by national law provisions.

=== Date ===
The term of the Cortes of Aragon expired four years after the date of its previous election, unless it was dissolved earlier. The election decree was required to be issued no later than 25 days before the scheduled expiration date of parliament and published on the following day in the Official Gazette of Aragon (BOA), with election day taking place 54 days after the decree's publication. The previous election was held on 27 May 2007, which meant that the chamber's term would have expired on 27 May 2011. The election decree was required to be published in the BOA no later than 3 May 2011, setting the latest possible date for election day on 26 June 2011.

The regional president had the prerogative to dissolve the Cortes of Aragon at any given time and call a snap election, provided that no motion of no confidence was in process and that dissolution did not occur before one year after a previous one. In the event of an investiture process failing to elect a regional president within a two-month period from the Cortes's reconvening, the chamber was to be automatically dissolved and a fresh election called.

The election to the Cortes of Aragon was officially called on 29 March 2011 with the publication of the corresponding decree in the BOA, setting election day for 22 May and scheduling for the chamber to reconvene on 21 June.

=== Electoral system ===
Voting for the Cortes was based on universal suffrage, comprising all Spanish nationals over 18 years of age, registered in Aragon and with full political rights, provided that they had not been deprived of the right to vote by a final sentence, nor were legally incapacitated. Amendments earlier in 2011 required non-resident citizens to apply for voting, a system known as "begged" voting (Spanish: Voto rogado).

The Cortes of Aragon had a minimum of 65 and a maximum of 80 seats, with electoral provisions fixing its size at 67. All were elected in three multi-member constituencies—corresponding to the provinces of Huesca, Teruel and Zaragoza, each of which was assigned an initial minimum of 13 seats and the remaining 28 distributed in proportion to population (with the seat-to-population ratio in the most populated province not exceeding 2.75 times that of the least populated one)—using the D'Hondt method and closed-list proportional voting, with a three percent-threshold of valid votes (including blank ballots) in each constituency. The use of this electoral method resulted in a higher effective threshold depending on district magnitude and vote distribution.

As a result of the aforementioned allocation, each Cortes constituency was entitled the following seats:

Seats	Constituencies
35	Zaragoza
18	Huesca
14	Teruel

The law did not provide for by-elections to fill vacant seats; instead, any vacancies arising after the proclamation of candidates and during the legislative term were filled by the next candidates on the party lists or, when required, by designated substitutes.

=== Outgoing parliament ===
The table below shows the composition of the parliamentary groups in the chamber at the time of the election call.

Parliamentary composition in March 2011
Groups	Parties	Legislators	
Groups	Parties	Seats	Total
Socialist Parliamentary Group	PSOE	30	30
People's Parliamentary Group in the Cortes of Aragon	PP	23	23
Aragonese Party's Parliamentary Group	PAR	8	8
Aragonese Union Parliamentary Group	CHA	4	4
Mixed Parliamentary Group	IU	1	2
Mixed Parliamentary Group	INDEP	1 (Note: Miguel Ferrer, former PAR legislator.)	2

== Parties and candidates ==
The electoral law allowed for parties and federations registered in the interior ministry, alliances and groupings of electors to present lists of candidates. Parties and federations intending to form an alliance were required to inform the relevant electoral commission within 10 days of the election call, whereas groupings of electors needed to secure the signature of at least one percent of the electorate in the constituencies for which they sought election, disallowing electors from signing for more than one list. Additionally, a balanced composition of men and women was required in the electoral lists, so that candidates of either sex made up at least 40 percent of the total composition.

Below is a list of the main parties and alliances which contested the election:

Candidacy	Parties and alliances	Leading candidate	Ideology	Previous result		Gov.	Ref.
Candidacy	Parties and alliances	Leading candidate	Ideology	Vote %	Seats	Gov.	Ref.
PSOE	List: Spanish Socialist Workers' Party (PSOE)	Eva Almunia	Social democracy	41.1%	30	Yes	
PP	List: People's Party (PP)	Luisa Fernanda Rudi	Conservatism; Christian democracy	31.1%	23	No	
PAR	List: Aragonese Party (PAR)	José Ángel Biel	Regionalism; Centrism	12.1%	9	Yes	
CHA	List: Aragonese Union (CHA)	Nieves Ibeas	Aragonese nationalism Eco-socialism	8.1%	4	No	
IU	List: United Left of Aragon (IU) – Communist Party of Aragon (PCE–A) – Revolutionary Workers' Party (POR) – Republican Left (IR)	Adolfo Barrena	Socialism; Communism	4.1%	1	No	
UPyD	List: Union, Progress and Democracy (UPyD)	Cristina Andreu	Social liberalism Radical centrism	Did not contest		No	

== Campaign ==
=== Debates ===
2011 Aragonese regional election debates
Date	Organizer(s)	Moderator(s)	P Present (Note: Denotes a main invitee attending the event.) S Surrogate (Note: Denotes a main invitee not attending the event, sending a surrogate in their place.) NI Not invited I Invited A Absent invitee						
Date	Organizer(s)	Moderator(s)	PSOE	PP	PAR	CHA	IU	Audience	Ref.
16 May	Aragón TV	Pepe Quílez	P Almunia	P Rudi	NI	NI	NI	14.0% (76,000)	
20 May	Aragón TV	Pepe Quílez	P Almunia	P Rudi	P Biel	P Ibeas	P Barrena	N/A	

== Opinion polls ==
The tables below list opinion polling results in reverse chronological order, showing the most recent first and using the dates when the survey fieldwork was done, as opposed to the date of publication. Where the fieldwork dates are unknown, the date of publication is given instead. The highest percentage figure in each polling survey is displayed with its background shaded in the leading party's colour. If a tie ensues, this is applied to the figures with the highest percentages. The "Lead" column on the right shows the percentage-point difference between the parties with the highest percentages in a poll.

=== Voting intention estimates ===
The table below lists weighted voting intention estimates. Refusals are generally excluded from the party vote percentages, while question wording and the treatment of "don't know" responses and those not intending to vote may vary between polling organisations. When available, seat projections determined by the polling organisations are displayed below (or in place of) the percentages in a smaller font; 34 seats were required for an absolute majority in the Cortes of Aragon.

Color key:

Exit poll

Polling firm/Commissioner	Fieldwork date	Sample size	Turnout	PSOE	PP	PAR	CHA	IU	UPyD	Lead
2011 regional election	22 May 2011	—N/a	67.9	29.0; 22	39.7; 30	9.2; 7	8.2; 4	6.2; 4	2.3; 0	10.7
Ipsos–Eco/FORTA	22 May 2011	?	?	30.3; 22/25	36.7; 27/30	10.6; 8/9	8.5; 4/5	6.5; 3/4	2.0; 0/1	6.4
IACOM/El Periódico	15 May 2011	?	?	? 26	? 27	? 6/7	? 4	? 3/4	–	?
Sigma Dos/El Mundo	10–12 May 2011	850	?	33.6; 25/27	38.4; 27/29	9.8; 7	8.1; 4	4.9; 2	–	4.8
NC Report/La Razón (Note: "El PP doblega al PSOE a siete días de la cita electoral". La Razón (in Spanish). 15 May 2011. Archived from the original on 3 September 2011.)	3–10 May 2011	?	?	36.9; 25/27	38.4; 28/29	? 7/8	–	–	–	2.5
Ikerfel/Vocento	9 May 2011	?	?	36.9; 26/28	34.6; 26/27	9.5; 7	7.7; 4/5	5.4; 2	–	2.3
TNS Demoscopia/Antena 3	27–28 Apr 2011	1,000	?	30.4; 23/24	37.0; 27/28	11.9; 8/9	9.2; 4/5	5.0; 3	–	6.6
NC Report/La Razón	25 Apr 2011	?	?	37.6; 26/27	38.5; 27/29	11.2; 7/8	6.3 ?	4.4 ?	–	0.9
Celeste-Tel/Terra	13–20 Apr 2011	600	?	31.1; 21	39.6; 28	10.3; 8	7.8; 5	5.9; 5	–	8.5
CIS	17 Mar–17 Apr 2011	1,596	?	35.7; 27	33.9; 26	10.3; 7	8.2; 4	5.1; 3	2.4; 0	1.8
Obradoiro de Socioloxía/Público	13–15 Apr 2011	1,207	?	36.6; 26	36.5; 28	8.9; 6	6.7; 4	5.8; 3	–	0.1
Sigma Dos/El Mundo	11–14 Apr 2011	850	?	33.8; 24/25	40.4; 28/30	7.8; 6	7.7; 4	5.4; 3/4	–	6.6
A+M/Heraldo de Aragón	1–14 Apr 2011	2,200	68.1	34.7; 26	34.9; 25	9.9; 7	7.9; 5	7.4; 4	–	0.2
Radio Ebro	23 Mar–1 Apr 2011	1,525	68.7	32.0; 25	38.9; 28	9.9; 6	10.0; 6	4.8; 2	–	6.9
A+M/Heraldo de Aragón	10–31 Jan 2011	2,200	67.6	35.6; 25	39.2; 28	9.3; 7	7.4; 3	6.2; 4	–	3.6
NC Report/La Razón	30 Dec–3 Jan 2011	?	?	32.8; 24/26	40.9; 29/30	–	–	–	–	8.1
Sigma Dos/El Mundo	17–21 Dec 2010	850	?	30.3; 23/26	40.0; 28/30	9.4; 6/7	8.6; 4	5.7; 3	–	9.7
PP	5 Dec 2010	?	?	33.7; 26	38.2; 28	9.5; 7	9.0; 5	4.7; 1	–	4.5
A+M/DGA	6–14 Nov 2010	2,524	?	29.7; 21/23	37.9; 27/29	13.0; 8/10	9.1; 5/6	5.3; 2/3	–	8.2
A+M/Heraldo de Aragón	20 Sep–5 Oct 2010	2,000	?	36.8; 27	35.0; 25	11.5; 8	9.2; 5	5.2; 2	–	1.8
PSOE	6–28 Sep 2010	1,500	?	? 28	? 26	? 7	? 5	? 1	–	?
Sigma Dos/El Mundo	21–24 May 2010	850	?	36.2; 27/28	41.2; 30/31	7.3; 4	6.7; 2/4	5.0; 2	–	5.0
A+M/Heraldo de Aragón	5–19 Apr 2010	2,000	65.4	40.1; 29	36.9; 27	8.3; 5	7.1; 4	5.0; 2	–	3.2
Obradoiro de Socioloxía/Público	8–15 Mar 2010	865	?	38.3; 29	38.0; 29	5.0; 2	7.0; 3	6.6; 4	–	0.3
2009 EP election	7 Jun 2009	—N/a	46.4	44.0 (33)	41.7 (31)	–	2.8 (1)	3.5 (1)	3.2 (1)	2.3
2008 general election	9 Mar 2008	—N/a	75.9	46.4 (35)	37.0 (27)	5.2 (3)	5.0 (2)	2.8 (0)	1.1 (0)	9.4
2007 regional election	27 May 2007	—N/a	66.5	41.1; 30	31.1; 23	12.1; 9	8.1; 4	4.1; 1	–	10.0

=== Voting preferences ===
The table below lists raw, unweighted voting preferences.

Polling firm/Commissioner	Fieldwork date	Sample size	PSOE	PP	PAR	CHA	IU	UPyD	Question	X mark	Lead
2011 regional election (Note: Does not include non-resident citizens.)	22 May 2011	—N/a	19.8	27.2	6.3	5.6	4.2	1.6	—N/a	30.6	7.4
CIS	17 Mar–17 Apr 2011	1,596	17.0	16.6	2.8	3.1	2.0	1.3	41.0	12.2	0.4
Obradoiro de Socioloxía/Público	13–15 Apr 2011	1,207	23.6	26.1	5.5	4.9	3.2	1.6	–	–	2.5
A+M/DGA	6–14 Nov 2010	2,524	18.9	23.3	6.6	5.8	3.8	–	23.5	11.3	4.4
Obradoiro de Socioloxía/Público	8–15 Mar 2010	865	25.4	23.2	2.6	4.4	4.6	–	–	–	2.2
2009 EP election	7 Jun 2009	—N/a	20.5	19.6	–	1.3	1.6	1.5	—N/a	52.9	0.9
2008 general election	9 Mar 2008	—N/a	35.3	28.4	4.0	3.8	2.2	0.9	—N/a	23.2	6.9
2007 regional election	27 May 2007	—N/a	27.7	21.0	8.2	5.5	2.8	–	—N/a	32.0	6.7

=== Victory preferences ===
The table below lists opinion polling on the victory preferences for each party in the event of a regional election taking place.

Polling firm/Commissioner	Fieldwork date	Sample size	PSOE	PP	PAR	CHA	IU	UPyD	Other/ None	Question	Lead
CIS	17 Mar–17 Apr 2011	1,596	24.5	26.3	5.0	4.6	2.8	1.2	10.3	26.4	1.8

=== Victory likelihood ===
The table below lists opinion polling on the perceived likelihood of victory for each party in the event of a regional election taking place.

Polling firm/Commissioner	Fieldwork date	Sample size	PSOE	PP	PAR	CHA	IU	UPyD	Other/ None	Question	Lead
CIS	17 Mar–17 Apr 2011	1,596	18.7	41.3	1.3	0.2	0.0	0.0	0.8	37.6	22.6

=== Preferred President ===
The table below lists opinion polling on leader preferences to become president of the Government of Aragon.

All candidates

Polling firm/Commissioner	Fieldwork date	Sample size							Other/ None/ Not care	Question	Lead
Polling firm/Commissioner	Fieldwork date	Sample size	Almunia PSOE	Rudi PP	Biel PAR	Ibeas CHA	Barrena IU	Andreu UPyD	Other/ None/ Not care	Question	Lead
CIS	17 Mar–17 Apr 2011	1,596	21.1	26.5	4.7	3.6	1.1	0.6	5.8	36.7	5.4
A+M/DGA	6–14 Nov 2010	2,524	17.2	23.4	7.6	3.1	3.3	–	2.6	42.8	6.2

Almunia vs. Rudi

Polling firm/Commissioner	Fieldwork date	Sample size			Other/ None/ Not care	Question	Lead
Polling firm/Commissioner	Fieldwork date	Sample size	Almunia PSOE	Rudi PP	Other/ None/ Not care	Question	Lead
Obradoiro de Socioloxía/Público	13–15 Apr 2011	1,207	34.9	36.4	28.7		1.5
Obradoiro de Socioloxía/Público	8–15 Mar 2010	865	26.3	31.6	42.1		5.3

=== Predicted President ===
The table below lists opinion polling on the perceived likelihood for each leader to become president.

Polling firm/Commissioner	Fieldwork date	Sample size			Other/ None/ Not care	Question	Lead
Polling firm/Commissioner	Fieldwork date	Sample size	Almunia PSOE	Rudi PP	Other/ None/ Not care	Question	Lead
Obradoiro de Socioloxía/Público	13–15 Apr 2011	1,207	29.3	40.0	30.7		10.7
Obradoiro de Socioloxía/Público	8–15 Mar 2010	865	21.7	31.0	47.3		9.3

== Results ==
=== Overall ===
← Summary of the 22 May 2011 Cortes of Aragon election results →
Parties and alliances	Popular vote			Seats	
Parties and alliances	Votes	%	±pp	Total	+/−
People's Party (PP)	269,729	39.69	+8.63	30	+7
Spanish Socialist Workers' Party (PSOE)	197,189	29.02	−12.12	22	−8
Aragonese Party (PAR)	62,193	9.15	−2.93	7	−2
Aragonese Union (CHA)	55,932	8.23	+0.08	4	±0
United Left of Aragon (IU)	41,874	6.16	+2.08	4	+3
Union, Progress and Democracy (UPyD)	15,667	2.31	New	0	±0
Greens–Ecolo (V–Ecolo)^{1}	4,621	0.68	+0.02	0	±0
Commitment with Aragon (CCA)	3,771	0.55	New	0	±0
Anti-Bullfighting Party Against Mistreatment of Animals (PACMA)	2,193	0.32	New	0	±0
Federation of Independents of Aragon (FIA)	980	0.14	New	0	±0
Aragonese Land (TA)	830	0.12	New	0	±0
Communist Unification of Spain (UCE)	603	0.09	New	0	±0
Aragon United Citizens Party (pCUA)	573	0.08	−0.29	0	±0
Family and Life Party (PFyV)	525	0.08	−0.08	0	±0
Liberal Democratic Centre (CDL)	482	0.07	New	0	±0
Humanist Party (PH)	440	0.06	−0.03	0	±0
The Independent Voice of Aragon (L'VIA)	249	0.04	New	0	±0
Blank ballots	21,678	3.19	+0.97		
Total	679,529			67	±0
Valid votes	679,529	98.50	−0.81		
Invalid votes	10,375	1.50	+0.81		
Votes cast / turnout	689,904	67.90	+1.39		
Abstentions	326,117	32.10	−1.39		
Registered voters	1,016,021				
Sources
Footnotes: ^{1} Greens–Ecolo results are compared to The Greens–Federation of Independents of Aragon totals in the 2007 election.

Popular vote
PP	39.69%
PSOE	29.02%
PAR	9.15%
CHA	8.23%
IU	6.16%
UPyD	2.31%
Others	2.25%
Blank ballots	3.19%

Seats
PP	44.78%
PSOE	32.84%
PAR	10.45%
CHA	5.97%
IU	5.97%

=== Distribution by constituency ===
Constituency	PP		PSOE		PAR		CHA		IU	
Constituency	%	S	%	S	%	S	%	S	%	S
Huesca	36.9	7	33.5	7	12.2	2	6.2	1	4.7	1
Teruel	37.0	6	27.4	4	16.5	3	5.1	−	6.5	1
Zaragoza	40.8	17	28.2	11	7.2	2	9.3	3	6.5	2
Total	39.7	30	29.0	22	9.2	7	8.2	4	6.2	4

== Aftermath ==
=== Government formation ===
Investiture; Nomination of Luisa Fernanda Rudi (PP)
Ballot →	13 July 2011
Required majority →	34 out of 67
Yes: • PP (30); • PAR (7)	37 / 67
No: • PSOE (22); • CHA (4); • IU (4)	30 / 67
Abstentions	0 / 67
Absentees	0 / 67

== Bibliography ==
- Ley Orgánica 5/1985, de 19 de junio, del Régimen Electoral General (Organic Law 5/1985). Official State Gazette (in Spanish). 19 June 1985 [version as of 30 April 2011]. BOE-A-1985-11672.
- Ley 2/1987, de 16 de febrero, Electoral de la Comunidad Autónoma de Aragón (Law 2/1987). Official State Gazette (in Spanish). 16 February 1987 [version as of 17 April 1999]. BOE-A-1987-5339.
- Ley Orgánica 5/2007, de 20 de abril, de reforma del Estatuto de Autonomía de Aragón (Organic Law 5/2007). Official State Gazette (in Spanish). 20 April 2007 [version as of 17 July 2010]. BOE-A-2007-8444.
- Ley 2/2009, de 11 de mayo, del Presidente y del Gobierno de Aragón (Law 2/2009). Official State Gazette (in Spanish). 11 May 2009 [version as of 19 May 2009]. BOE-A-2009-9390.
- Decreto de 28 de marzo de 2011, del Presidente del Gobierno de Aragón, por el que se convocan elecciones a las Cortes de Aragón (Decree). Official Gazette of Aragon (in Spanish). 28 March 2011.
