= Esplús =

Coordinates: 41°48′N 0°17′E

- Flag Coat of arms
- Interactive map of Esplús
- Country: Spain
- Autonomous community: Aragon
- Province: Huesca
- Municipality: Esplús

Area
  - Total: 68 km^{2} (26 sq mi)

Population (2025-01-01)
  - Total: 676
  - Density: 9.9/km^{2} (26/sq mi)
- Time zone: UTC+1 (CET)
  - Summer (DST): UTC+2 (CEST)

Esplús (Spanish: [esˈplus]; Catalan: [əsˈplus]) is a municipality located in the province of Huesca, Aragon, Spain. According to the 2004 census (INE), the municipality has a population of 733 inhabitants.

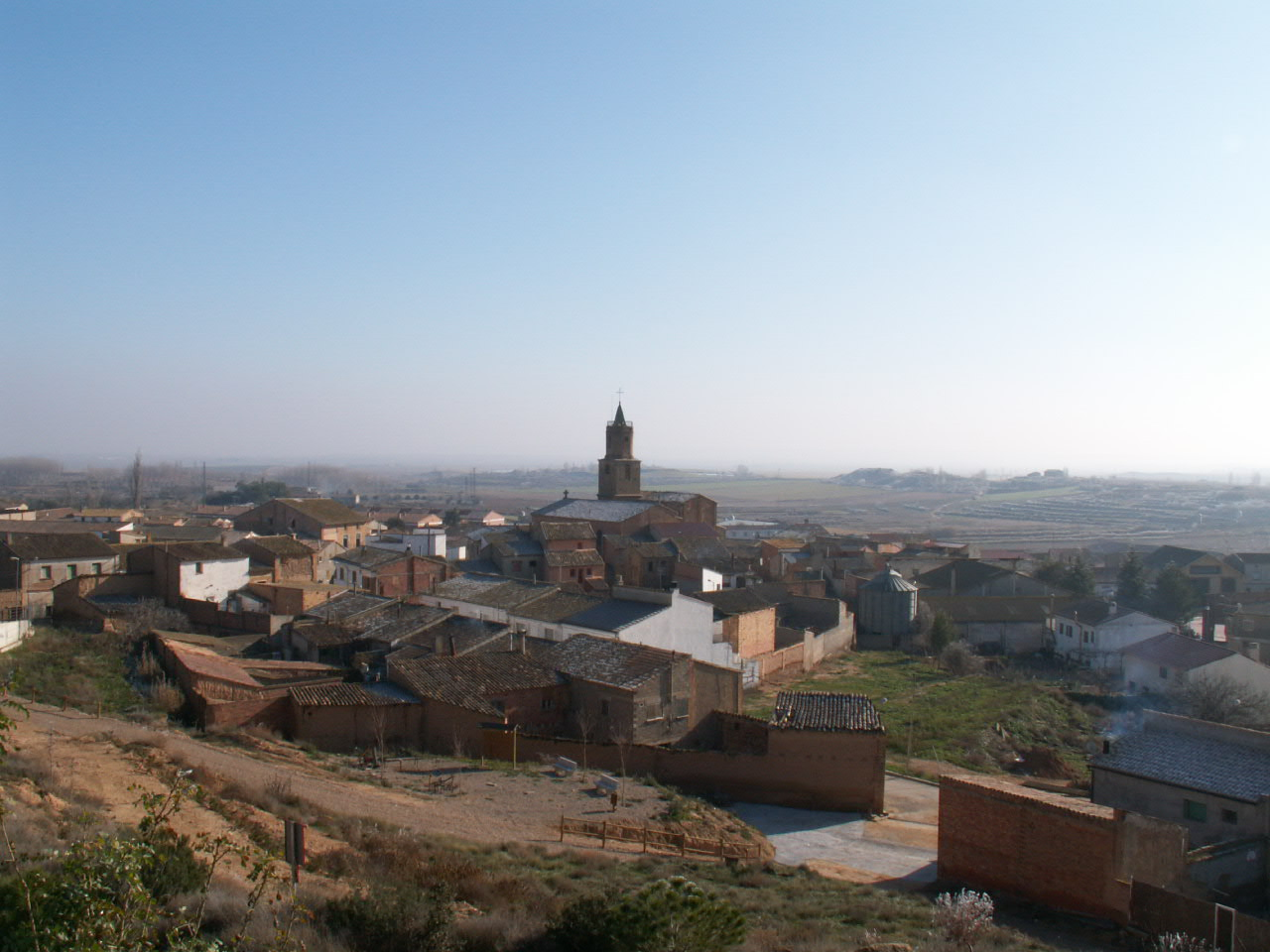
View of Esplús, Huesca, Spain

== History ==
During the Spanish Civil War, the town participated in the Spanish revolution and was collectivised by the CNT and UGT.

== See also ==
- List of municipalities in Huesca
