= List of education ministers of Spain =

This is a list of the Spanish ministers of education since the early nineteenth century, when the government department was established. Throughout history, this position has also had jurisdiction over culture, historical heritage, science and sports. Before 1900, it was the Ministry of Development the department responsible for education affairs.

Name	Term		Duration	Party	Government		Ref.
Antonio García Alix (1852–1911)	18 April 1900	6 March 1901	322 days	Conservative	Francisco Silvela	Alfonso XIII (1886–1931)	
Antonio García Alix (1852–1911)	18 April 1900	6 March 1901	322 days	Conservative	Marcelo Azcárraga	Alfonso XIII (1886–1931)	
The Count of Romanones (1863–1950)	6 March 1901	6 December 1902	1 year, 275 days	Liberal	Práxedes Mateo Sagasta	Alfonso XIII (1886–1931)	
Manuel Allendesalazar (1856–1923)	6 December 1902	20 July 1903	226 days	Conservative	Francisco Silvela	Alfonso XIII (1886–1931)	
The Count of Bugallal (Note: Guillermo Rancés y Esteban, Marquess of Casa Laiglesia, was acting minister from September 29 to October 7, 1903.) (1861–1932)	20 July 1903	5 December 1903	138 days	Conservative	The Marquess of Pozo Rubio	Alfonso XIII (1886–1931)	
Lorenzo Domínguez Pascual (Note: Guillermo Rancés y Esteban, Marquess of Casa Laiglesia, was acting minister from May 7 to May 16, 1904.) (1863–1926)	5 December 1903	16 December 1904	1 year, 11 days	Conservative	Antonio Maura	Alfonso XIII (1886–1931)	
Juan de la Cierva y Peñafiel (1864–1938)	16 December 1904	8 April 1905	113 days	Conservative	Marcelo Azcárraga	Alfonso XIII (1886–1931)	
Juan de la Cierva y Peñafiel (1864–1938)	16 December 1904	8 April 1905	113 days	Conservative	The Marquess of Pozo Rubio	Alfonso XIII (1886–1931)	
Carlos María Cortezo y Prieto de Orche (1850–1933)	8 April 1905	23 June 1905	76 days	Conservative	The Marquess of Pozo Rubio	Alfonso XIII (1886–1931)	
Andrés Mellado y Fernández (1846–1913)	23 June 1905	31 October 1905	130 days	Liberal	Eugenio Montero Ríos	Alfonso XIII (1886–1931)	
The Count of Albox (1842–1931)	31 October 1905	1 December 1905	31 days	Liberal	Eugenio Montero Ríos	Alfonso XIII (1886–1931)	
Vicente Santamaría de Paredes (1853–1924)	1 December 1905	10 June 1906	191 days	Liberal	Segismundo Moret	Alfonso XIII (1886–1931)	
Alejandro San Martín y Satrústegui (1847–1908)	10 June 1906	6 July 1906	26 days	Liberal	Segismundo Moret	Alfonso XIII (1886–1931)	
The Count of Gimeno (1852–1936)	6 July 1906	30 November 1906	147 days	Liberal	José López Domínguez	Alfonso XIII (1886–1931)	
Pedro Rodríguez de la Borbolla (1855–1922)	30 November 1906	4 December 1906	4 days	Liberal	Segismundo Moret	Alfonso XIII (1886–1931)	
The Count of Gimeno (1852–1936)	4 December 1906	25 January 1907	52 days	Liberal	The Marquess of Vega de Armijo	Alfonso XIII (1886–1931)	
Faustino Rodríguez-San Pedro (Note: During his absences, César Silió y Cortes, Under-Secretary, served as acting minister from September 9 to September 22, 1907, from September 10 to October 4, 1908 and from September 9 to September 27, 1909.) (1833–1925)	25 January 1907	21 October 1909	2 years, 269 days	Conservative	Antonio Maura	Alfonso XIII (1886–1931)	
Antonio Barroso y Castillo (1854–1916)	21 October 1909	9 February 1910	111 days	Liberal	Segismundo Moret	Alfonso XIII (1886–1931)	
The Count of Romanones (1863–1950)	9 February 1910	9 June 1910	120 days	Liberal	José Canalejas y Méndez	Alfonso XIII (1886–1931)	
Julio Burell (Note: Acting ministers during absences: Cristino Martos y Llovell (22 August 1910–29 August 1910) and Eugenio Montero Villegas (19 August 1910–26 September 1910).) (1859–1919)	9 June 1910	2 January 1911	207 days	Liberal	José Canalejas y Méndez	Alfonso XIII (1886–1931)	
Amós Salvador Rodrigáñez (1845–1922)	2 January 1911	3 April 1911	91 days	Liberal	José Canalejas y Méndez	Alfonso XIII (1886–1931)	
The Count of Gimeno (1852–1936)	3 April 1911	12 March 1912	344 days	Liberal	José Canalejas y Méndez	Alfonso XIII (1886–1931)	
Santiago Alba y Bonifaz (1872–1949)	12 March 1912	31 December 1912	294 days	Liberal	José Canalejas y Méndez	Alfonso XIII (1886–1931)	
Santiago Alba y Bonifaz (1872–1949)	12 March 1912	31 December 1912	294 days	Liberal	The Marquess of Alhucemas (Note: He acted as acting prime minister after the assassination of José Canalejas on 12 November 1912)	Alfonso XIII (1886–1931)	
Santiago Alba y Bonifaz (1872–1949)	12 March 1912	31 December 1912	294 days	Liberal	The Count of Romanones	Alfonso XIII (1886–1931)	
The Count of López Muñoz (1850–1929)	31 December 1912	13 June 1913	164 days	Liberal	The Count of Romanones	Alfonso XIII (1886–1931)	
Joaquín Ruiz Jiménez (1854–1934)	13 June 1913	27 October 1913	136 days	Liberal	The Count of Romanones	Alfonso XIII (1886–1931)	
Francisco Bergamín y García (1855–1937)	27 October 1913	11 December 1914	1 year, 45 days	Conservative	Eduardo Dato	Alfonso XIII (1886–1931)	
The Count of Bugallal (1861–1932) acting minister	11 December 1914	4 January 1915	24 days	Conservative	Eduardo Dato	Alfonso XIII (1886–1931)	
The Count of Esteban Collantes (Note: Jorge Silvela y Loring, Under-Secretary, was acting minister from August 16 to October 7, 1915.) (1847–1937)	4 January 1915	25 October 1915	294 days	Conservative	Eduardo Dato	Alfonso XIII (1886–1931)	
Rafael Andrade Navarrete (1856–1928)	25 October 1915	9 December 1915	45 days	Conservative	Eduardo Dato	Alfonso XIII (1886–1931)	
Julio Burell (Note: Natalio Rivas Santiago, Under-Secretary, served as acting minister from December 17 to December 21, 1915.) (1859–1919)	9 December 1915	19 April 1917	1 year, 131 days	Liberal	The Count of Romanones	Alfonso XIII (1886–1931)	
José Francos Rodríguez (1862–1931)	19 April 1917	11 June 1917	53 days	Liberal	The Marquess of Alhucemas	Alfonso XIII (1886–1931)	
Rafael Andrade Navarrete (1856–1928)	11 June 1917	3 November 1917	145 days	Conservative	Eduardo Dato	Alfonso XIII (1886–1931)	
Felipe Rodés Baldrich (Note: José Martínez Ruiz, Under-Secretary, was acting minister from February 15 to February 20, 1918.) (1878–1957)	3 November 1917	2 March 1918	119 days	Liberal	The Marquess of Alhucemas	Alfonso XIII (1886–1931)	
Luis Silvela Casado (1865–1928)	2 March 1918	22 March 1918	20 days	Liberal	The Marquess of Alhucemas	Alfonso XIII (1886–1931)	
Santiago Alba y Bonifaz (1872–1949)	22 March 1918	10 October 1918	202 days	Liberal	Antonio Maura	Alfonso XIII (1886–1931)	
The Count of Romanones (1863–1950)	10 October 1918	9 November 1918	30 days	Liberal	Antonio Maura	Alfonso XIII (1886–1931)	
Julio Burell (1859–1919)	9 November 1918	5 December 1918	26 days	Liberal	The Marquess of Alhucemas	Alfonso XIII (1886–1931)	
Joaquín Salvatella (1881–1932)	5 December 1918	15 April 1919	131 days	Liberal	The Count of Romanones	Alfonso XIII (1886–1931)	
César Silió (1865–1944)	15 April 1919	20 July 1919	96 days	Conservative	Antonio Maura	Alfonso XIII (1886–1931)	
José del Prado Palacio (Note: Eloy Bullón Fernández, Under-Secretary, was acting minister from August 21 to September 2, 1919.) (1865–1926)	20 July 1919	12 December 1919	145 days	Conservative	Joaquín Sánchez de Toca	Alfonso XIII (1886–1931)	
Natalio Rivas Santiago (1865–1958)	12 December 1919	5 May 1920	145 days	Conservative	Manuel Allendesalazar	Alfonso XIII (1886–1931)	
Luis Espada Guntín (Note: Joaquín Caro y Arroyo, Count of Peña Ramiro, served as acting minister from August 7 to August 30, 1920.) (1858–1937)	5 May 1920	1 September 1920	119 days	Conservative	Eduardo Dato	Alfonso XIII (1886–1931)	
The Marquess of Portago (1865–1921)	1 September 1920	29 December 1920	119 days	Conservative	Eduardo Dato	Alfonso XIII (1886–1931)	
Tomás Montejo y Rica (1856–1933)	29 December 1920	13 March 1921	74 days	Conservative	Eduardo Dato	Alfonso XIII (1886–1931)	
Tomás Montejo y Rica (1856–1933)	29 December 1920	13 March 1921	74 days	Conservative	The Count of Bugallal (Note: He acted acting prime minister after the assassination of Eduardo Dato from March 8 to March 13, 1921)	Alfonso XIII (1886–1931)	
Francisco Aparicio y Ruiz (Note: Juan José Romero Martínez was acting minister from June 24 to June 30, 1921.) (1852–1932)	13 March 1921	14 August 1921	154 days	Conservative	Manuel Allendesalazar	Alfonso XIII (1886–1931)	
César Silió (1865–1944)	14 August 1921	1 April 1922	230 days	Conservative	Antonio Maura	Alfonso XIII (1886–1931)	
César Silió (1865–1944)	14 August 1921	1 April 1922	230 days	Conservative	José Sánchez-Guerra y Martínez	Alfonso XIII (1886–1931)	
Tomás Montejo y Rica (Note: Carlos Castel y González de Amezúa, Under-Secretary, was acting minister from August 26 to September 18, 1922.) (1856–1933)	1 April 1922	4 December 1922	247 days	Conservative	José Sánchez-Guerra y Martínez	Alfonso XIII (1886–1931)	
Isidoro de la Cierva y Peñafiel (1870–1939)	4 December 1922	7 December 1922	3 days	Conservative	José Sánchez-Guerra y Martínez	Alfonso XIII (1886–1931)	
Joaquín Salvatella (1881–1932)	7 December 1922	15 September 1923	282 days	Liberal	The Marquess of Alhucemas	Alfonso XIII (1886–1931)	
Alfonso Pérez Nieva (Note: Under-Secretary of Public Instruction and Fine Arts in charge of the ministerial department.) (1859–1931) acting minister	17 September 1923	21 December 1923	95 days	Independent	The Marquess of Estella	Alfonso XIII (1886–1931)	
Javier García de Leániz (Note: During his absences: Luis Cubillo y Muro (9 October 1924 – 28 October 1924) and Alfonso Pérez Nieva (5 Agusut 1925 – 24 Agusut 1925).) (1862–1938)	22 September 1923	3 December 1925	2 years, 72 days	Conservative	The Marquess of Estella	Alfonso XIII (1886–1931)	
Eduardo Callejo de la Cuesta (Note: Miguel Allué Salvador served as acting minister twice: from January 5 to January 10, 1930 and from January 14 to January 17, 1930.) (1875–1950)	3 December 1925	30 January 1930	4 years, 58 days	Patriotic Union	The Marquess of Estella	Alfonso XIII (1886–1931)	
The Duke of Alba (1878–1953)	30 January 1930	22 February 1930	23 days	Independent	The Count of Xauen	Alfonso XIII (1886–1931)	
Elías Tormo (1869–1957)	24 February 1930	18 February 1931	85 days	Conservative	The Count of Xauen	Alfonso XIII (1886–1931)	
José Gascón y Marín (1875–1962)	19 February 1931	14 April 1931	54 days	Independent	Juan Bautista Aznar-Cabañas	Alfonso XIII (1886–1931)	
Marcelino Domingo (1884–1939)	15 April 1931	16 December 1931	245 days	Radical Socialist Republican	Niceto Alcalá-Zamora	Niceto Alcalá-Zamora (1931–1936)	
Marcelino Domingo (1884–1939)	15 April 1931	16 December 1931	245 days	Radical Socialist Republican	Manuel Azaña	Niceto Alcalá-Zamora (1931–1936)	
Fernando de los Ríos (1879–1949)	16 December 1931	12 June 1933	1 year, 178 days	Socialist	Manuel Azaña	Niceto Alcalá-Zamora (1931–1936)	
Francisco Barnés Salinas (1877–1947)	12 June 1933	12 September 1933	92 days	Radical Socialist Republican	Manuel Azaña	Niceto Alcalá-Zamora (1931–1936)	
Domingo Barnés Salinas (1879–1940)	12 September 1933	16 December 1933	95 days	Radical Socialist Republican	Alejandro Lerroux	Niceto Alcalá-Zamora (1931–1936)	
Domingo Barnés Salinas (1879–1940)	12 September 1933	16 December 1933	95 days	Radical Socialist Republican	Diego Martínez Barrio	Niceto Alcalá-Zamora (1931–1936)	
José Pareja Yévenes (1888–1951)	16 December 1933	3 March 1934	77 days	Radical Republican	Alejandro Lerroux	Niceto Alcalá-Zamora (1931–1936)	
Salvador de Madariaga (Note: Alejandro Lerroux, Prime Minister, served as acting minister from March 5 to March 8, 1934.) (1883–1962)	3 March 1934	28 April 1934	56 days	Independent	Alejandro Lerroux	Niceto Alcalá-Zamora (1931–1936)	
Filiberto Villalobos (Note: José María Cid Ruiz-Zorrilla, Minister of Communications, served as acting minister from August 7 to August 15, 1934.) (1879–1955)	28 April 1934	29 December 1934	245 days	Liberal Democrat	Ricardo Samper	Niceto Alcalá-Zamora (1931–1936)	
Filiberto Villalobos (1879–1955)	28 April 1934	29 December 1934	245 days	Liberal Democrat	Alejandro Lerroux	Niceto Alcalá-Zamora (1931–1936)	
Joaquín Dualde Gómez (1875–1963)	29 December 1934	3 April 1935	95 days	Liberal Democrat	Alejandro Lerroux	Niceto Alcalá-Zamora (1931–1936)	
Ramón Prieto Bances (1889–1972)	3 April 1935	6 May 1935	33 days	Independent	Alejandro Lerroux	Niceto Alcalá-Zamora (1931–1936)	
Joaquín Dualde Gómez (1875–1963)	6 May 1935	25 September 1935	142 days	Liberal Democrat	Alejandro Lerroux	Niceto Alcalá-Zamora (1931–1936)	
Juan José Rocha García (1877–1938)	25 September 1935	29 October 1935	34 days	Radical Republican	Joaquín Chapaprieta	Niceto Alcalá-Zamora (1931–1936)	
Luis Bardají López (1880–1942)	29 October 1935	14 December 1935	46 days	Radical Republican	Joaquín Chapaprieta	Niceto Alcalá-Zamora (1931–1936)	
Manuel Becerra Fernández (1867–1940)	14 December 1935	30 December 1935	16 days	Radical Republican	Manuel Portela Valladares	Niceto Alcalá-Zamora (1931–1936)	
Filiberto Villalobos (1879–1955)	30 December 1935	19 February 1936	51 days	Independent	Manuel Portela Valladares	Niceto Alcalá-Zamora (1931–1936)	
Marcelino Domingo (1884–1939)	19 February 1936	13 May 1936	84 days	Republican Left	Manuel Azaña	Niceto Alcalá-Zamora (1931–1936)	
Marcelino Domingo (1884–1939)	19 February 1936	13 May 1936	84 days	Republican Left	Augusto Barcia Trelles (Note: Acting prime minister from 10 to 13 May 1936)	Manuel Azaña (1936–1939)	
Francisco Barnés Salinas (1877–1947)	13 May 1936	19 July 1936	67 days	Republican Left	Santiago Casares Quiroga	Manuel Azaña (1936–1939)	
Marcelino Domingo (1884–1939)	19 July 1936	19 July 1936	0 days	Republican Left	Diego Martínez Barrio	Manuel Azaña (1936–1939)	
Start of the Spanish Civil War						Manuel Azaña (1936–1939)	
Republican side						Manuel Azaña (1936–1939)	
Francisco Barnés Salinas (1877–1947)	19 July 1936	4 September 1936	47 days	Republican Left	José Giral	Manuel Azaña (1936–1939)	
Jesús Hernández Tomás (1907–1971)	4 September 1936	5 April 1938	1 year, 213 days	Communist	Francisco Largo Caballero	Manuel Azaña (1936–1939)	
Jesús Hernández Tomás (1907–1971)	4 September 1936	5 April 1938	1 year, 213 days	Communist	Juan Negrín	Manuel Azaña (1936–1939)	
Segundo Blanco (1899–1957)	5 April 1938	5 March 1939	334 days	Independent (CNT)	Juan Negrín	Manuel Azaña (1936–1939)	
José del Río Rodríguez (?–1988)	5 March 1939	31 March 1939	26 days	Republican Union	National Defence Council	José Miaja (1939)	
Rebel side
José María Pemán (Note: Serving under the title of "President of the Culture and Education Commission".) (1897–1981)	4 October 1936	31 January 1938	1 year, 119 days	Independent	Junta Técnica del Estado	Francisco Franco (1939–1975)	
Pedro Sainz Rodríguez (1897–1986)	31 January 1938	1 April 1939	1 year, 60 days	National Movement	Franco I	Francisco Franco (1939–1975)	
End of the Spanish Civil War						Francisco Franco (1939–1975)	
Pedro Sainz Rodríguez (1897–1986)	1 April 1939	27 April 1939	26 days	National Movement	Franco I	Francisco Franco (1939–1975)	
The Count of Rodezno (1882–1952) acting minister	28 April 1939	9 August 1939	103 days	Independent	Franco I	Francisco Franco (1939–1975)	
José Ibáñez Martín (1896–1969)	9 August 1939	19 July 1951	11 years, 344 days	National Movement	Franco II	Francisco Franco (1939–1975)	
José Ibáñez Martín (1896–1969)	9 August 1939	19 July 1951	11 years, 344 days	National Movement	Franco III	Francisco Franco (1939–1975)	
Joaquín Ruiz-Giménez Cortés (1913–2009)	19 July 1951	15 February 1956	4 years, 211 days	National Movement	Franco IV	Francisco Franco (1939–1975)	
Jesús Rubio García-Mina (1908–1976)	15 February 1956	10 July 1962	6 years, 145 days	National Movement	Franco IV	Francisco Franco (1939–1975)	
Jesús Rubio García-Mina (1908–1976)	15 February 1956	10 July 1962	6 years, 145 days	National Movement	Franco V	Francisco Franco (1939–1975)	
Manuel Lora-Tamayo (1904–2002)	10 July 1962	16 April 1968	5 years, 281 days	National Movement	Franco VI	Francisco Franco (1939–1975)	
Manuel Lora-Tamayo (1904–2002)	10 July 1962	16 April 1968	5 years, 281 days	National Movement	Franco VII	Francisco Franco (1939–1975)	
José Luis Villar Palasí (1922–2012)	16 April 1968	11 June 1973	5 years, 56 days	National Movement	Franco VII	Francisco Franco (1939–1975)	
José Luis Villar Palasí (1922–2012)	16 April 1968	11 June 1973	5 years, 56 days	National Movement	Franco VIII	Francisco Franco (1939–1975)	
Julio Rodríguez Martínez (1928–1979)	11 June 1973	3 January 1974	206 days	National Movement	Luis Carrero Blanco	Francisco Franco (1939–1975)	
Julio Rodríguez Martínez (1928–1979)	11 June 1973	3 January 1974	206 days	National Movement	The Duke of Fernández-Miranda (acting)	Francisco Franco (1939–1975)	
Julio Rodríguez Martínez (1928–1979)	11 June 1973	3 January 1974	206 days	National Movement	The Marquess of Arias Navarro	Francisco Franco (1939–1975)	
Cruz Martínez Esteruelas (1932–2000)	3 January 1974	11 December 1975	1 year, 342 days	National Movement	The Marquess of Arias Navarro	Francisco Franco (1939–1975)	
Cruz Martínez Esteruelas (1932–2000)	3 January 1974	11 December 1975	1 year, 342 days	National Movement	The Marquess of Arias Navarro	Juan Carlos I (1975–2014)	
Carlos Robles Piquer (1925–2018)	11 December 1975	7 July 1976	209 days	National Movement	The Marquess of Arias Navarro	Juan Carlos I (1975–2014)	
The Marquess of Ibias (1927–2018)	7 July 1976	4 July 1977	362 days	Independent	The Duke of Suárez	Juan Carlos I (1975–2014)	
The Baron of Carondelet (1913–2003)	4 July 1977	5 April 1979	1 year, 275 days	Centrist	The Duke of Suárez	Juan Carlos I (1975–2014)	
José Manuel Otero (1940–)	5 April 1979	8 September 1980	1 year, 156 days	Centrist	The Duke of Suárez	Juan Carlos I (1975–2014)	
Juan Antonio Ortega y Díaz-Ambrona (1939–)	8 September 1980	1 December 1981	1 year, 84 days	Centrist	The Duke of Suárez	Juan Carlos I (1975–2014)	
Juan Antonio Ortega y Díaz-Ambrona (1939–)	8 September 1980	1 December 1981	1 year, 84 days	Centrist	The Marquess of Ría de Ribadeo	Juan Carlos I (1975–2014)	
Federico Mayor Zaragoza (1934–2024)	1 December 1981	2 December 1982	1 year, 1 day	Centrist	The Marquess of Ría de Ribadeo	Juan Carlos I (1975–2014)	
José María Maravall (1942–)	2 December 1982	11 July 1988	5 years, 222 days	Socialist	Felipe González	Juan Carlos I (1975–2014)	
Javier Solana (1942–)	11 July 1988	23 June 1992	3 years, 348 days	Socialist	Felipe González	Juan Carlos I (1975–2014)	
Alfredo Pérez Rubalcaba (1951–2019)	23 June 1992	13 July 1993	1 year, 20 days	Socialist	Felipe González	Juan Carlos I (1975–2014)	
Gustavo Suárez Pertierra (1949–)	13 July 1993	2 July 1995	1 year, 354 days	Socialist	Felipe González	Juan Carlos I (1975–2014)	
Jerónimo Saavedra (1936–2023)	2 July 1995	5 May 1996	308 days	Socialist	Felipe González	Juan Carlos I (1975–2014)	
The Countess of Bornos (1952–)	5 May 1996	18 January 1999	2 years, 258 days	Popular	José María Aznar	Juan Carlos I (1975–2014)	
Mariano Rajoy (1955–)	18 January 1999	28 April 2000	1 year, 101 days	Popular	José María Aznar	Juan Carlos I (1975–2014)	
Pilar del Castillo (1952–)	28 April 2000	18 April 2004	3 years, 356 days	Popular	José María Aznar	Juan Carlos I (1975–2014)	
María Jesús San Segundo (1958–2010)	18 April 2004	11 April 2006	1 year, 358 days	Socialist	José Luis Rodríguez Zapatero	Juan Carlos I (1975–2014)	
Mercedes Cabrera (1951–)	11 April 2006	8 April 2009	2 years, 362 days	Socialist	José Luis Rodríguez Zapatero	Juan Carlos I (1975–2014)	
Ángel Gabilondo (1949–)	8 April 2009	22 December 2011	2 years, 258 days	Independent	José Luis Rodríguez Zapatero	Juan Carlos I (1975–2014)	
José Ignacio Wert (1950–)	22 December 2011	26 June 2015	3 years, 186 days	Independent	Mariano Rajoy	Juan Carlos I (1975–2014)	
José Ignacio Wert (1950–)	22 December 2011	26 June 2015	3 years, 186 days	Independent	Mariano Rajoy	Felipe VI (2014-present)	
The Baron of Claret (1956–)	26 June 2015	7 June 2018	2 years, 346 days	Popular	Mariano Rajoy	Felipe VI (2014-present)	
Isabel Celaá (1949–)	7 June 2018	12 July 2021	3 years, 35 days	Socialist	Pedro Sánchez	Felipe VI (2014-present)	
Pilar Alegría (1977–)	12 July 2021	22 December 2025	4 years, 163 days	Socialist	Pedro Sánchez	Felipe VI (2014-present)	
Milagros Tolón (1968–)	22 December 2025	Incumbent	326 days	Socialist	Pedro Sánchez	Felipe VI (2014-present)	
