= Secretary of State for Education (Spain) =

Second highest-ranking official within the Ministry of Education of Spain

Secretary of State of Education
- Secretario de Estado de Educación
- Coat of Arms used by the Government

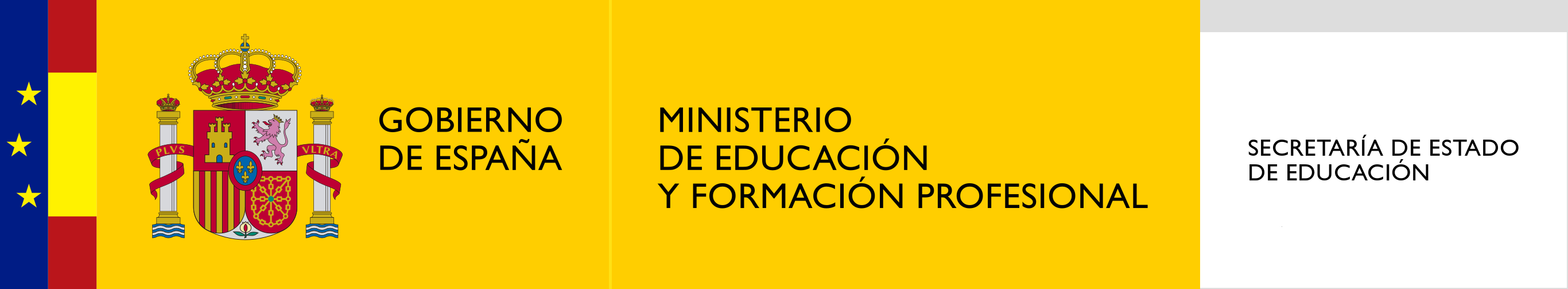

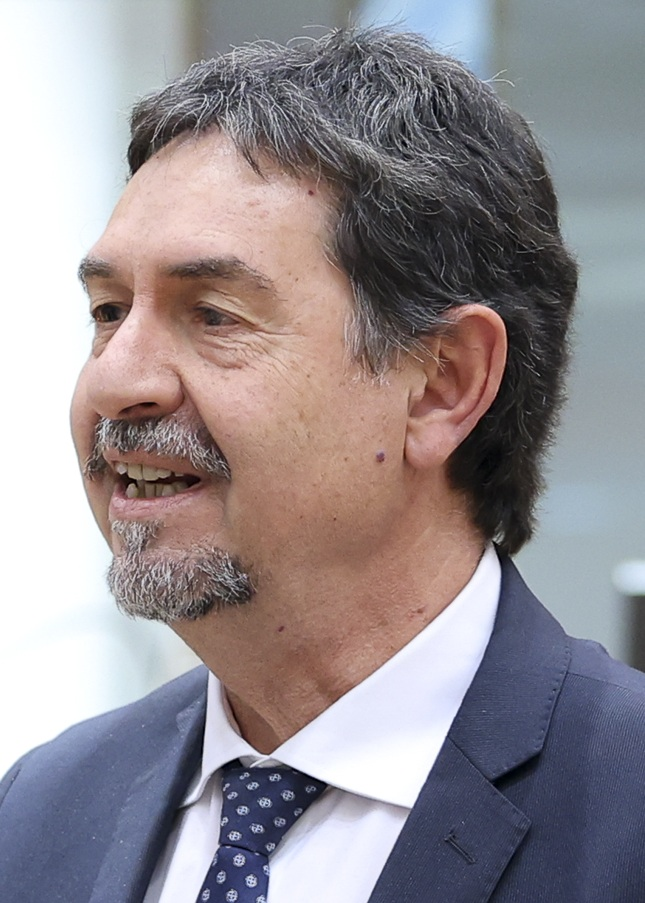
- Incumbent; Abelardo de la Rosa Díaz since August 28, 2024
- Ministry of Education and Vocational Training; Secretariat of State of Education
- Style: The Most Excellent (formal); Mr. Secretary of State of Education (informal)
- Reports to: The Education Minister
- Nominator: The Education Minister
- Appointer: The Monarch
- Precursor: Secretary General of Education
- Formation: July 20, 1988
- First holder: Alfredo Pérez Rubalcaba
- Salary: € 112,538.66 per year
- Website: mecd.gob.es

The secretary of state for education (SEE) is the second highest-ranking official within the Ministry of Education of Spain. It is a political appointment made by the Monarch on the advice of the minister of education.

The secretary of state has ultimate responsibility for the execution of Government policy over non-university education. He coordinates the Spanish education system that currently is delegated to the regions; he proposes the subjects of study (with the exception of the sport subjects that are under the jurisdiction of the Superior Sports Council and the vocational training subjects, competence of the General Secretariat for Vocational Training); he designs and directs scholarship and study aid programs; he promotes equality and non-discrimination policies in education; he oversees civil servants working in education and is also in charge of international relations regarding education on behalf of the Government.

== History ==
The education ministry was created in Spain on March 31, 1900. However, the first department in charge of the education of citizens was created in the Constitution of 1812.

Since then, the objective of educating the population has never disappeared and has been maintained until the present day. The direct precursor of the Secretariat of State of Education is the General Secretariat of Education that was created on April 8, 1985 which assumed all the responsibilities for education.

In 1988, a new governmental restructuring created the current Secretariat of State of Education which took over the responsibilities of the old General Secretariat. The Secretary of State lost part of its responsibilities when, in 1992, the State delegated to its autonomous regions the responsibilities for education, maintaining at State level only the requirement to establish the basis of the education system and its coordination and the responsibility for universities and international treaties on educational matters.

In May 1996, the Secretariat of State was replaced by the General Secretariat of Education and Vocational Training but was restored in 1999. The same happened between 2004 and 2008.

Today, the Secretary of State has no responsibility for universities, because since 2018 they have been transferred to the resurrected Ministry of Science so the current responsibilities are limited to coordinating the education system, overseeing public servants, carrying out vocational training, making educational inspections to guarantee the compliance of the law and making international treaties about education.

In 2020, the Secretary of State, that from 2018 to 2020 was named Secretary of State for Education and Vocational Training, was renamed as Secretary of State for Education due to the creation of the General Secretariat for Vocational Training.

== Structure ==
Under the Secretary of State are the following officials:

- The Director-General for Territorial Evaluation and Cooperation
  - The Deputy Director-General for Academic Organization.
    The official responsible for the non-university education management and its promotion; for university admission procedures along with the Ministry of Science, Innovation and Universities; for overseeing the issue of education titles; for directing the Central Registry of non-university degrees and the Registry of academic and non-university professionals degrees and the approval of foreign titles.
  - The Deputy Director-General for Territorial Cooperation and Educational Innovation.
    The official responsible the relations between the Ministry, the regional education departments and the private education centres; he helps the ministry in its responsibilities over the education of the autonomous cities of Ceuta and Melilla; he manages the education aid; he controls the education centres registry and establishes the legal framework for private, half-private/half-public and foreign education centres.
  - The National Institute of Educational Evaluation.
    The department responsible for the general evaluation of the education system in coordination with its counterparts in the regions; for collaborating along with the Under Secretary in international agreements on the educational criteria for evaluation (especially with the European Union) and elaborating the State System of Education Indicators, in addition to doing studies and producing reports on how to improve the evaluation system.
  - The National Institute of Educational Technologies and Teacher Training.
    The department responsible for the elaboration of educational materials which may help the teaching staff in its job; preparing programs in coordination with the regions to improve the training of the teaching staff; promoting the use of technologies in education and creating and maintaining portals of educational resources and social networks to promote the exchange of experiences and resources among teaching staff.
- The Director-General for Educational Planning and Management
  - The Deputy Director-General for Scholarships, Study Aids and Educational Promotion.
    The official responsible for the design, planning and direction of education aids in coordination with the Ministry of Science, Innovation and Universities for all kind of students. He is also responsible for coordinating all aid programs (State-level programs and regional-level programs) and the promotion of action to improve the excellence of the students.
  - The External Educational Action Unit.
    The official responsible for the coordination of international relations on non-university education and vocational training, particularly in the European Union, assisting the Minister in his meetings at the EU Education Councils and for the management of education programs abroad and participation in the negotiation of international treaties in its area of responsibility.
  - The Deputy Director-General for Education Centers and Programs.
    It is responsible for the management of education infrastructure and the design and implementation of education programs.
  - The Deputy Director-General for Education Inspection.
    It is the official in charge of inspecting the education system, within the State's competencies, as well as monitoring the rules and measures implemented by the regions to ensure that they comply with the general guidelines established by the Cortes Generales.

== List of secretaries of state ==
No.	Image	Name	Term of office			Minister(s) serving under:	Prime Minister appointed by:
No.	Image	Name	Began	Ended	Days of service	Minister(s) serving under:	Prime Minister appointed by:
1.º		Alfredo Pérez Rubalcaba	30 July 1988	27 June 1992	1428	Javier Solana	Felipe González
2.º		Álvaro Marchesi Ullastres	7 July 1992	11 May 1996	1404	Alfredo Pérez Rubalcaba Gustavo Suárez Pertierra Jerónimo Saavedra	Felipe González
3.º		Jorge Fernández Díaz	23 January 1999	6 May 2000	469	Mariano Rajoy	José María Aznar
4.º		Julio Iglesias de Ussel	6 May 2000	20 April 2004	1445	Pilar del Castillo	José María Aznar
5.º		Eva Almunia	15 April 2008	25 October 2010	923	Mercedes Cabrera Ángel Gabilondo	José Luis Rodríguez Zapatero
6.º		Mario Bedera Bravo	6 November 2010	24 December 2011	413	Ángel Gabilondo	José Luis Rodríguez Zapatero
7.º		Montserrat Gomendio	14 January 2012	4 July 2015	1267	José Ignacio Wert	Mariano Rajoy
8.º		Marcial Marín Hellín	4 July 2015	19 June 2018	1169	Íñigo Méndez de Vigo	Mariano Rajoy
9.º		Alejandro Tiana	19 June 2018	1 June 2022	1443	Isabel Celaá Pilar Alegría	Pedro Sánchez
10.º		José Manuel Bar Cendón	1 June 2022	28 August 2024	819	Pilar Alegría	Pedro Sánchez
11.º		Abelardo de la Rosa Díaz	28 August 2024	Incumbent	740	Pilar Alegría Milagros Tolón	Pedro Sánchez
