= Julio Burell =

Spanish politician (1859–1919)

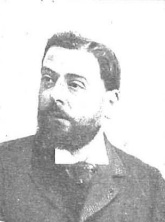

Minister of Public Instruction and Fine Arts of Spain
- In office 9 November 1918 – 5 December 1918
- Prime Minister: Marquis of Alhucemas
- Preceded by: Count of Romanones
- Succeeded by: Joaquín Salvatella
- In office 9 December 1915 – 19 April 1917
- Prime Minister: Count of Romanones
- Preceded by: Rafael Andrade Navarrete
- Succeeded by: José Francos Rodríguez
- In office 9 June 1910 – 2 January 1911
- Prime Minister: José Canalejas
- Preceded by: Count of Romanones
- Succeeded by: Amós Salvador y Rodrigáñez

Minister of Governance of Spain
- In office 19 April 1917 – 11 June 1917
- Prime Minister: Marquis of Alhucemas
- Preceded by: Joaquín Ruiz Jiménez
- Succeeded by: José Sánchez-Guerra

Personal details
- Born: Julio Burell y Cuéllar; 1 February 1859 Iznájar, Córdoba, Spain
- Died: 21 December 1919 (aged 60) Madrid, Spain
- Party: Liberal
- Other political affiliations: Democratic

Julio Burell y Cuéllar (1 February 1859 – 21 December 1919) was a Spanish politician who served as minister during the Spanish Restoration.
