= Education Secretary =

Education Secretary may refer to:

- Secretariat of Public Education, a federal government authority in Mexico
- Secretary for Education, a public office in the government of Hong Kong
- Secretary of State for Education, a public office in the government of the United Kingdom
- Secretary of State for Education (Spain), a public office in the government of Spain

== See also ==
- Cabinet Secretary for Education and Skills, a cabinet position in the Scottish Government
- United States Secretary of Education, the head of the United States Department of Education
