= Francisco de Paula Campá y Porta =

Spanish Obstetrician

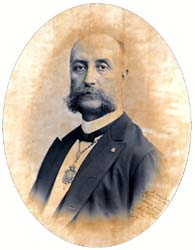
- Medical career
- Field: obstetrics and gynecology

Francisco de Paula Campá y Porta was a Spanish gynecologist and obstetrician. He was the founding figures of Valencian gynecology along with Manuel Candela in the nineteenth century.

== Biography ==
Francisco was born in Vich, in 1838. He studied medicine at the University of Barcelona, and graduated in the year 1861. After working for a year in Vich, he returned to Barcelona, where he devoted himself to obstetric and gynecological studies and histopathological studies. Later he joined the experimentalist group headed by Amalio Gimeno y Cabañas in Valencia. He was the professor of obstetrics and diseases of women and children from 1872 to 1889. In the same year he moved to the University of Barcelona as a professor. In 1892 he died in Barcelona.

== Works ==
His numerous work made him one of the greatest international medical disseminators of his time. In 1877 he founded the magazine La Crónica Médica. He published more than two hundred articles, in which apart from clinical cases with histopathological analysis, he developed the study of the pathophysiology of menstruation and puerperal sepsis, whose pathology and prevention can be analyzed from the assumptions of medical microbiology. His instruments for work are exhibited in the Historic-Medical Museum of the University of Valencia, along with other relevant doctors such as Manuel Candela and Francisco Bonilla Mart.

== Publications ==
- Campá y Porta, Francisco de Paula (1878). Librería de Pascual Aguilar, Valencia, ed. Tratado completo de obstetricia
- Campá y Porta, Francisco de Paula (1881). Imp. José M. Blesa, ed. Lecciones de ginecopatía o enfermedades especiales de la mujer, profesadas en la facultad de Valencia
