= Juan de Contreras y López de Ayala =

Juan de Contreras y López de Ayala 9th Marquess of Lozoya
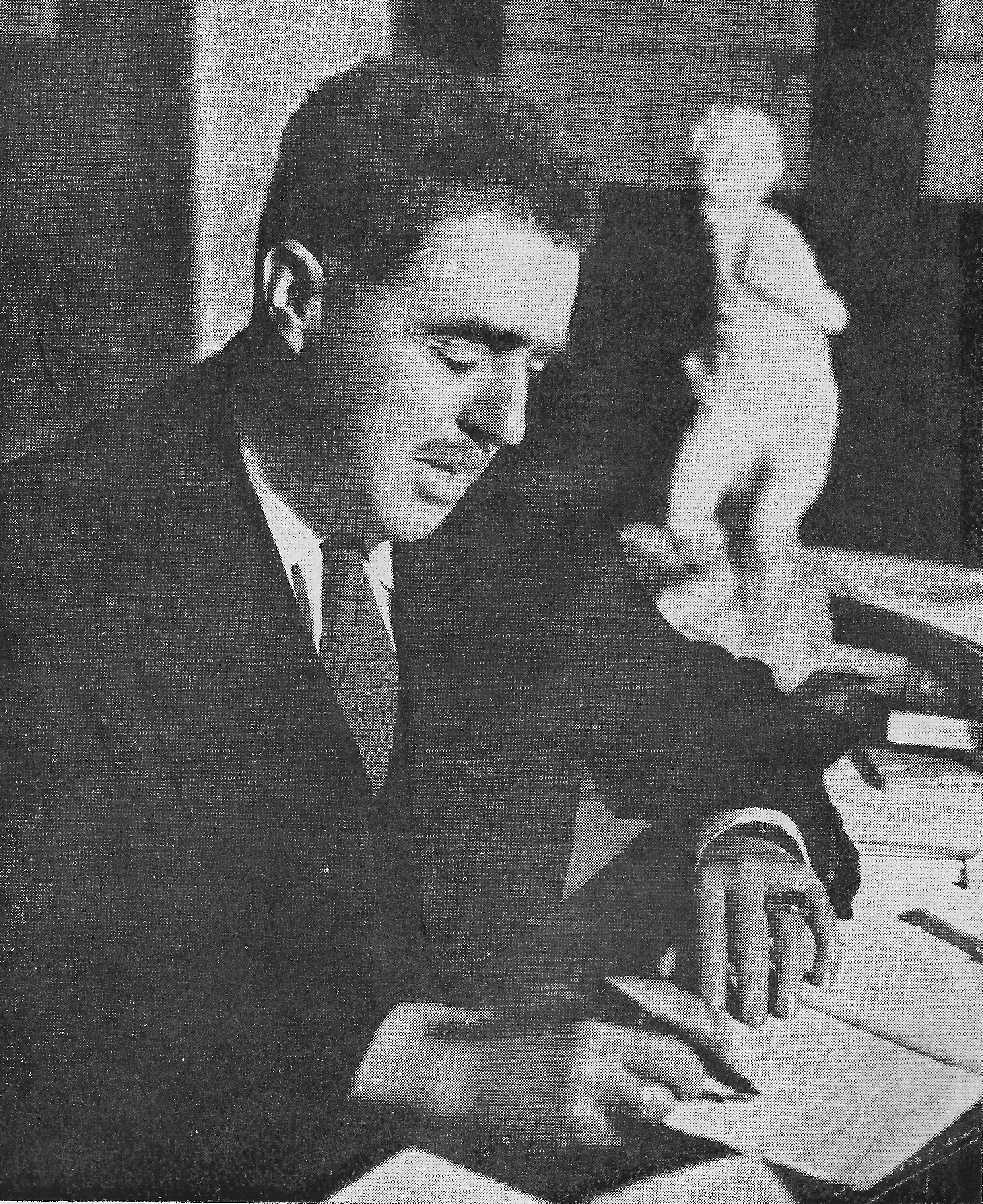
- Born: June 30, 1893; Segovia, Spain
- Died: April 23, 1978; Segovia, Spain
- Office: Director General of Fine Arts

Juan de Contreras y López de Ayala Thomé y del Hierro (Segovia, June 30, 1893 – Segovia, April 23, 1978), better known as the Marquess of Lozoya as the ninth holder of that noble title, was a Spanish historian, university professor, art critic, writer, journalist, and politician.

== Biography ==
Juan de Contreras y López de Ayala Thomé y del Hierro was born in the city of Segovia on June 30, 1893, into a noble family, the son of Luis de Contreras and Ramona López de Ayala y del Hierro, the 7th Marquess and Marchioness of Lozoya.

In his youth he studied at the Institute of Segovia, later earning degrees in Law from the University of Salamanca and in Philosophy and Letters from the University of Madrid. He was professor of Spanish History and Art History at the University of Valencia, University of Madrid, and University of Navarra.

He was elected deputy to the Cortes republicanas in the 1933 elections for Segovia. In the 1936 Spanish general election he was re-elected deputy for Segovia on the lists of the CEDA. Between 1939 and 1951 he held the position of Director General of Fine Arts. Later, in 1952, he became director of the Spanish Academy in Rome. In 1964 he was appointed director of the Institute of Spain and, in 1978, director of the Real Academia de Bellas Artes de San Fernando. He served as vice president of the Hispanic Society of America and was a member of several foreign academies. He presided over the Centro Segoviano from February 26, 1959, and the Association of Spanish Writers and Artists from 1964, both until his death.

He was also a procurador (representative) in the Francoist Cortes.

He inherited the title of Marquess of Lozoya upon the death of his brother Luis and married in 1931 his cousin Constanza López de Ayala y Morenes, daughter of the Counts of Cedillo, with whom he had two daughters, Dominica and María Angelina. In 1976 King Juan Carlos I of Spain granted him the Grandee of Spain dignity in a personal capacity.

He died in his native Segovia on April 23, 1978.

== Awards and distinctions ==
- Fastenrath Award of the Royal Spanish Academy (1920).
- honorary doctorate from the University of Navarra (1972).
- A street in Madrid bears his name, located in the Estrella neighborhood of the Retiro district.
- In the town of Lozoya there is a square named after him (Plaza del Marqués de Lozoya).
- In San Martín de la Vega, south of Madrid, there is also a street dedicated to him.
- A High School in Cuéllar bears his name.
- A public school in Torrecaballeros is also named in his honor.
- Since 1981, the Spanish Ministry of Culture and Sport has awarded the annual Premio Marqués de Lozoya for cultural research, managed by the ethnological research center of the Museo del Traje.

== Works ==
He published more than 400 studies on Spanish art history; his Historia del arte hispánico was a landmark in art-historical bibliography. Among his historical works are:

- El Monasterio de San Antonio el Real de Segovia (1918).
- Vida del segoviano Rodrigo de Contreras, gobernador de Nicaragua (Toledo, 1921).
- Historia de las corporaciones menestrales en Segovia (1930).
- El concepto romántico de la Historia (1930).
- Historia del arte hispánico, 5 vols. (Barcelona, 1931–1934).
- El arte gótico en España: Arquitectura, escultura y pintura (1935).
- Los orígenes del Imperio (La España de Fernando e Isabel) (Madrid, 1939).
- La Maravillosa historia de Carlos, bastardo Falconi (Segovia, 1951).
- Muebles de estilo español (1962).
- Historia de España, 6 vols. (Barcelona, 1967).
- Enrique Segura y su tiempo (Madrid, 1974).
- Santiago Padrós, vida y obra (Madrid, 1972).

Of his poetry and fiction:

- Sonetos espirituales (1918).
- El regidor, Novela de tierras de Segovia (Madrid, 1927).
- Poemas (Segovia, 1976), collecting his seven poetry books and other texts.

== Bibliography ==
- Pasamar Alzuria, Gonzalo; Peiró Martín, Ignacio (2002). "Contreras y López de Ayala, Juan de (Marqués de Lozoya)". Diccionario Akal de Historiadores españoles contemporáneos. Madrid: Ediciones Akal. pp. 198–200. ISBN 84-460-1489-0.
