= Ministry of Education (Spain) =

Government ministry of Spain

Ministry of Education, Vocational Training and Sports
- Ministerio de Educación, Formación Profesional y Deportes

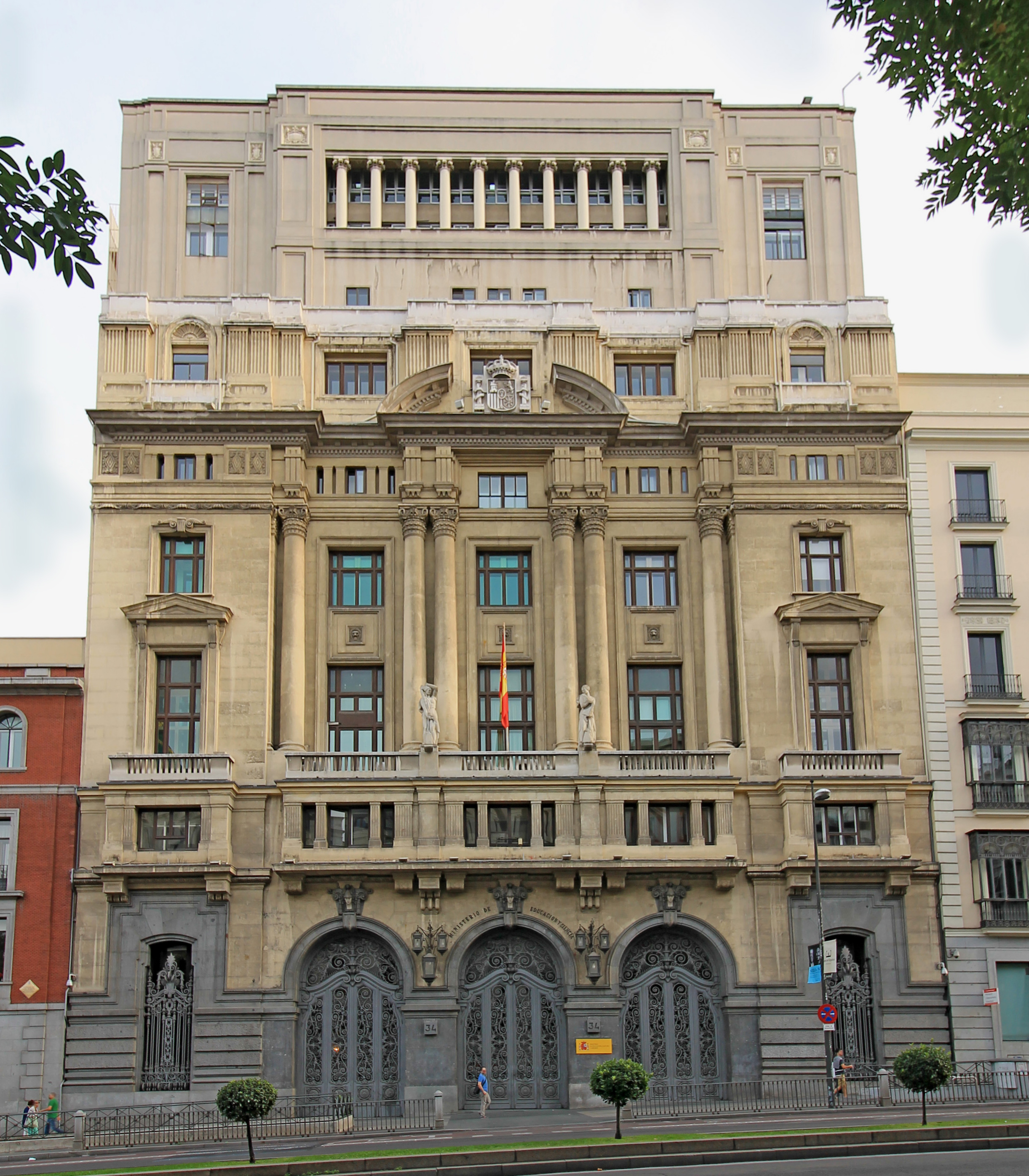
- Headquarters of the Ministry of Education

Agency overview
- Formed: March 31, 1900; 126 years ago (as Ministry of Public Instruction and Fine Arts)
- Preceding agency: Ministry of Development
- Type: Ministry
- Jurisdiction: Government of Spain
- Headquarters: 36 Alcalá Street, Madrid
- Employees: 9,395 (2024) (Note: Spanish public education system has 576,786 school and high school teachers although they depend from the regional educational administrations. The university employees and professors are 192,949)
- Annual budget: € 6.78 billion, 2026
- Minister responsible: Milagros Tolón, Minister
- Agency executives: Abelardo de la Rosa Díaz, Secretary of State for Education; José Manuel Rodríguez Uribes, President of the National Sports Council; Clara Sanz López, Secretary-General for Vocational Training; Santiago Antonio Roura Gómez, Under-Secretary
- Child agencies: State School Council; National Sports Council; Spanish Anti-Doping Agency
- Website: Ministry of Education (in Spanish)

The Ministry of Education, Vocational Training and Sports (MEFPD) is the department of the Government of Spain responsible for designing and implementing the government policy on education and vocational training. This covers all levels of the education system—except university education—, including physical education, through the National Sports Council. Likewise, it is also responsible for promoting, in coordination with the Ministry of Foreign Affairs, international relations in the field of non-university education.

Education in Spain is established as a decentralized system in which the regions have powers over the basic and secondary education—except Ceuta and Melilla—while the central government establishes the general basis of the system and it is responsible for the tertiary education. As of 2026, the government department responsible for universities is the Ministry of Science, Innovation and Universities. To coordinate the system, it exists the Sectoral Conference on Education that is chaired by the Education Minister and integrated by the regional ministers of education.

This is the last ministry created in the 19th century, being a split from the Ministry of Development. It was founded in March 1900 as Ministry of Public Instruction and Fine Arts and, since then, it has always had educational, cultural, sports and scientific powers, with the exception of those periods —such as the current one—in which the Ministry of Culture or the Ministry of Science has existed.

Its main headquarters have been located, since 1928, at number 34 Alcalá street, in Madrid, having previously been housed in the Palacio de Fomento between 1900 and 1928. The adjacent building, number 36, has also housed Ministry's services since 1931.

Since December 2025, the minister has been Milagros Tolón, from the Spanish Socialist Workers Party.

== History ==
=== Nineteenth century ===
For centuries, although there were royal academies, universities and some local teachers, education was dominated by the Catholic Church. However, following the approval of the Constitution of Cádiz in 1812, educational policy in Spain began to be institutionalized. This fundamental law, in its article 369, established a Directorate-General of Studies for the supervision of public education, which was under the authority of the government of the Crown.

Educational policies stagnated during the Absolutist Six-Year Period (1814–1820) but, the success of lieutenant colonel Rafael del Riego's coup on January 1, 1820, forced King Ferdinand VII to restore the 1812 Constitution and the following year the General Regulation on Public Instruction was passed by the Cortes Generales. This regulation, in addition to distinguishing between public and private education, organized education through three levels: first education (taught in primary schools and consisting of teaching reading and writing as well as elementary rules of arithmetic and catechism), second education (comprising preparatory studies to later access higher studies) and third education (covering studies that qualified to practice a particular profession). This norm also foresaw the establishment of primary schools in those areas with more than 100 residents and one secondary school per province. However, its implementation was interrupted in 1823 by the restoration of absolutism, which sidelined educational issues and subordinated them one again to the Church, and they would not regain prominence until the king's death in 1833.

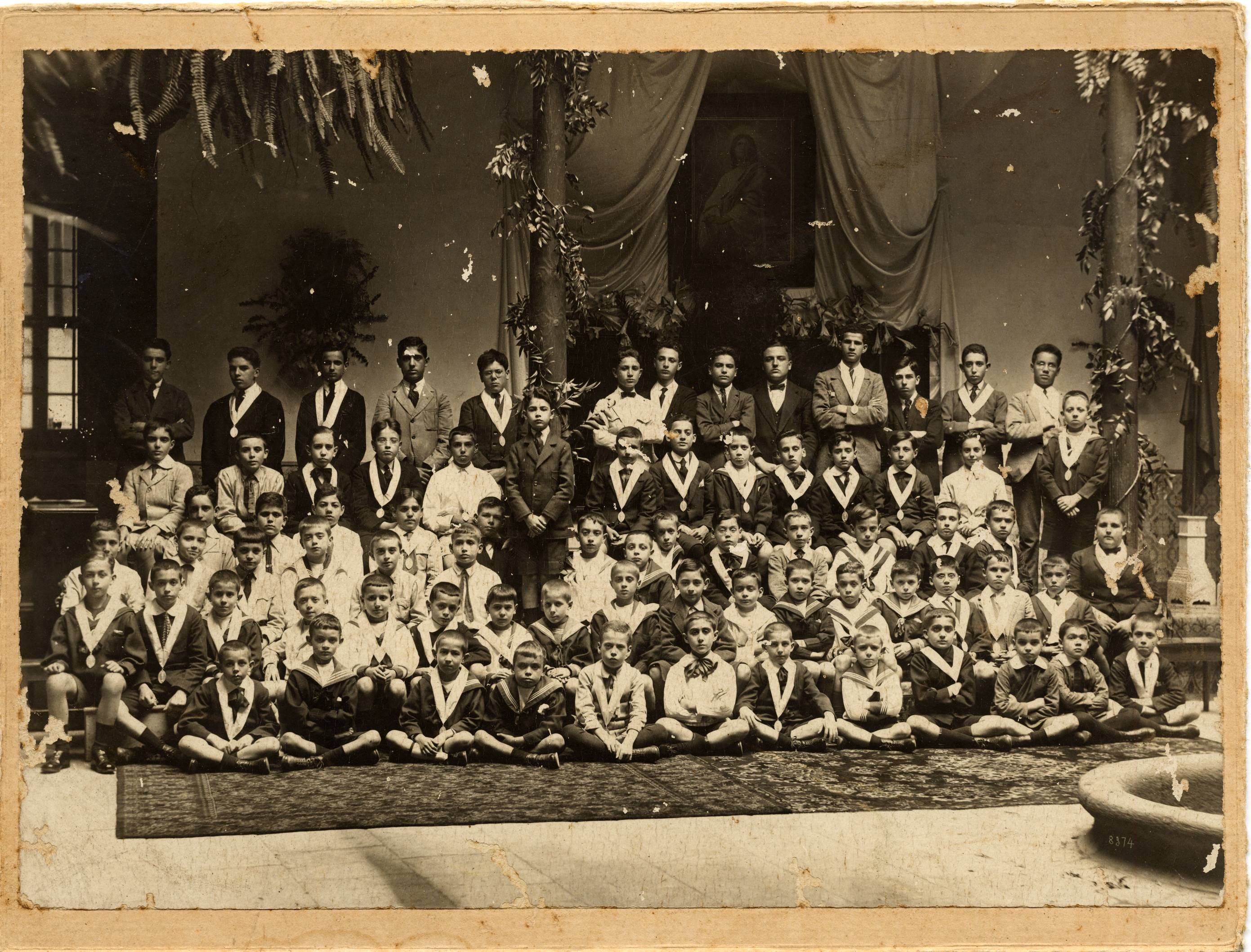
School portrait with some decorated children. 1890s.

The Directorate-General, which since 1825 had been known as the Inspectorate-General for Public Instruction, recovered its original name on September 25, 1834, by royal decree of Queen Regent Maria Christina. This body was part of the Ministry of the Interior since its re-establishment in 1832 and, when the Ministry of Development was created in 1847, it was transferred to it. The directorate was renamed in 1846 as Directorate-General for Public Instruction and, briefly, from 1851 to 1855, it was part of the Ministry of Grace and Justice (this ministry also had education responsibilities before 1812 and from 1823 to 1832).

The government responsibilities in the field of Education remained within the Ministry of Development for the next 45 years, through the Directorate-General of Public Instruction, which also encompassed functions related to culture. The directorate was divided into eight departments: Universities; Institutes; Primary Education; Archives, Libraries and Museums; Fine Arts and Public Works; Accounting; Civil Construction; and the Bulletin of Intellectual and Industrial Property.

==== Moyano Law ====
In the final years of this period, prior to the existence of its own ministry, two important educational texts were approved, the second of which stands out as the most relevant in its field; the Moyano Law.

First, in August 1857 Queen Isabella II gave royal assent to Law of 17 August 1857, which established the general guidelines on which the future Law on Public Instruction had to be approved. Broadly speaking, this law maintained the public-private duality in education, with the former being the responsibility of the State and the latter subject to some State oversight. It also maintained the division of the education system into three levels, established uniformity in textbooks and the funding system for schools, the compulsory and free nature of primary public education, entry into the public teaching profession through public and competitive exams, and the mandate to define the powers of civil authorities in matters of public instruction and its inspection.

Two months later, the Public Instruction Law of 9 September 1857, popularly known as the Moyano Law —in honor of development minister Claudio Moyano, the promoter of the law—, was approved. This new rule, which expanded upon the previous one, was structured through four major sections —On studies; On educational establishments; On public teachers; On the government and administration of public instruction— and more than 300 articles that detailed and expanded the bases of the law of August 17.

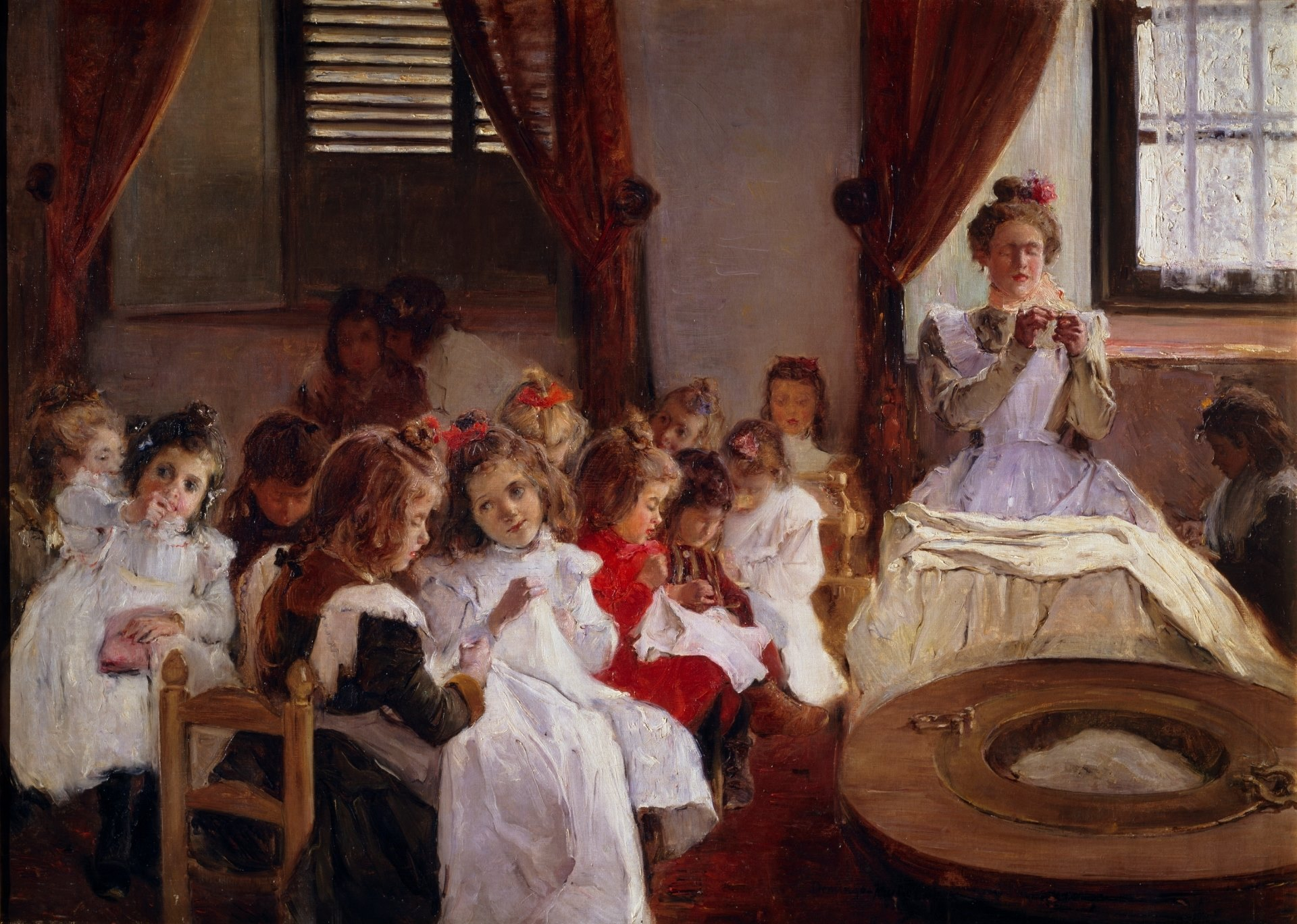
La amiga (En Córdoba), by Domingo Muñoz. This painting depicts a girls' school. 1901.

As for the specific content, the law divided primary education into two levels: elementary and upper education. This education was compulsory from six to nine years of age (with penalties for parents who failed to comply) and free for those who could not afford it. It established single-sex education; boys and girls did not have to study the same subjects but were instead assigned according to what were considered "sex-specific tasks". Special schools for the deaf and blind were also maintained. Secondary education comprised two courses of two and four years, respectively, and higher education was offered in faculties, higher schools, or professional schools.

Regarding the teaching profession, the law stipulated access and requirements for primary school teachers, secondary school teachers, normal school teachers, and professors at secondary schools, vocational schools, and universities. It also established the possibility of female teachers providing elementary education to girls.

It also regulated the different types of educational establishments, the population requirements for the existence of each, the method of financing, and included the possibility of enabling evening hours for adult education. Private schools, with private funding, were authorized and their studies were valid and equivalent to those of public schools.

Finally, the law established the structure of educational government and administration, with the Ministry of Development at the top and a Directorate-General for Public Instruction. Likewise, to advise these, it existed the Royal Council on Public Instruction (today known as the State School Council) and a nation-level inspectorate. From this central structure, the country was divided into university districts, headed by a university; each province had a Board of Public Instruction and each municipality a Board of Primary Education.

The purpose of this law was not to innovate, but to compile existing legislation and it remained in force, without relevant modifications, until the approval of the General Education Law of 1970. The longevity of this law was a source of rejoicing for its promoter, minister Moyano, who, as an elderly senator in 1887, declared before the Plenary:

You [speaking to the Senate members] are already aware of the many events this country endured; there have been two monarchies, two or three republics, because i have lost count; yet, despite the passage of thirty years, two monarchies and two republics, the law remains in force [...]. The law, therefore, and i can say this loudly, was a national law, not a partisian law [...].

— MOYANO, C., Senate Journal, Wednesday, April 27, 1887.

==== 1886 project ====
The growing importance of education was reflected not only by the approval of several education laws in 1857, but also by a Royal Decree sanctioned by the queen regent, Maria Christina of Austria, on May 7, 1886, which established the division of the Ministry of Development into a Ministry of Public Instruction and of Sciences, Letters and Fine Arts, and a Ministry of Public Works, Agriculture, Industry and Trade. Despite that the decree mandated that the new ministries would be established on July 1, 1886, this did not materialize until the 1900 Budget Act.

=== Twentieth century ===
Thus, by virtue of Article 20 of the Budget Act of March 31, 1900, the Cortes authorized His Majesty's Government to reorganize the Development Ministry by dividing its powers. On April 18, 1900, Queen Regent Maria Christina issued a royal decree establishing two new departments: the Ministry of Public Instruction and Fine Arts and the Ministry of Agriculture, Industry, Trade and Public Works (from 1905 onwards this department was once again known as the Ministry of Development).

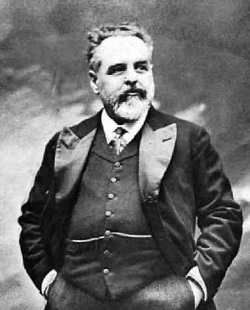
Antonio García Alix by Kaulak

As established in the decree, two were the reasons for the division: first, the Development Ministry had "vast" responsibilities since it went from managing a budget of 15 million pesetas in 1846 to one of almost 81 million pesetas in 1900, and they were "heterogeneous" thus trying to "provide the means for them to be managed promptly and successfully, and to be addressed in each branch with unity of thought and with the intensity of attention that such a delicate task demands".

Regarding the division of responsibilities, the new Ministry of Public Instruction and Fine Arts was entrusted with authority over "public and private education in all its different classes and levels, the promotion of science and literature, fine arts, archives, libraries, and museums". It also assumed responsibility for the Geographic and Statistical Institute. The Ministry of Development retained matters relating to "railways, roads, canals, ports, lighthouses and beacons; and those related to agriculture, industry, and trade". Antonio García Alix was appointed as the first minister of education in the history of Spain.

In 1901, The Count of Romanones was appointed as education minister and he incorporated to the State Budget the salary of teachers. Prior to this, these salaries were paid by local governments—which acted as intermediaries between the Crown government and the teachers—but it had provoked numerous criticisms due severe delays in payments.

During the next 30 years, the existence of an specialized ministry for education and cultural affairs led to the creation of new administrative bodies and positions, such us the Ministry's Under-Secretary to assist the ministry in its duties, the Directorate-General for Fine Arts and directorates-general for each education level, among others, as well as numerous specialized bodies of lower rank. It was also at this time that the current headquarters were built on Alcalá Street 36 in Madrid.

==== Education in the Second Republic ====
In Second Republic (1936–1939), and following the division made by Miguel Fernández Cárcar, professor at the Public University of Navarra, we will divide the period into two stages: a stage of peace (1931–1936) and another of war (1936–1939).

===== Peace stage (1931–1936) =====
In the first two years of the young republic, the Ministry of Public Instruction focused its efforts into establishing a Single or Unified School, which had been defended for decades by important figures in the world of pedagogy, such as Lorenzo Luzuriaga. This movement sought to unify educational policy from childhood to adulthood, eliminating educational levels and disregarding the sexual, economic, or social characteristics of students—it was, at that time, a utopian belief to try to unite in school what society divided. In addition to establishing principles already known in Spanish education such as free and compulsory education for the first years of schooling, academic freedom was recognized and the secular nature of schools was promoted, granting the State exclusive responsibility for teaching and expelling the Church from education and, in a less aggressive way, private freedom in this area. Furthermore, the right of the autonomous regions to organize their teaching, as well as to provide it bilingually, was recognized, and the Council on Public Instruction, called the National Culture Council since 1932, was reorganized.

The anti-religious policy caused discomfort not only in the Church, but also among the people, especially during the parliamentary process and subsequent approval of the Law on Religious Confessions and Congregations of 1933. This discontent over the republic's religious policy (known in historiography as the religious problem [Spanish: cuestión religiosa]), coupled with the enormous cost to the public treasury of financing the ambitious educational reforms of the republican government, and the growing conflict between the central and regional educational administrations, made the republican educational policy unworkable.

===== War stage (1936–1939) =====
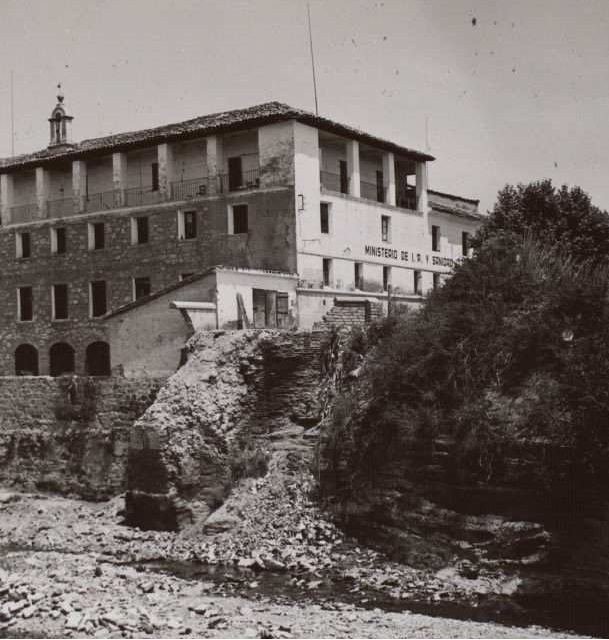
Building of the Ministry of Public Instruction and Health in Barbastro. 1930s.

The coup d'état of July 1936 and the ensuing civil war provoked a radical change in the republican educational policy. Almost immediately, a Commission for the Reform of Primary Education was formed, composed of members of the UGT and the CNT. Likewise, long-overdue legislation was passed to regulate aspects such as the ages for accessing certain educational levels, and the authorizations of private establishments were revoked, requiring them to reapply.

At the same time, an ideological reform was imposed which, through teachers, oriented education towards knowledge of the war and the promotion of the principles of the republican government. Likewise, teacher training was reorganized to fulfill these tasks, and history teachers were required to "review historical facts in order to rectify those traditionally accepted concepts and judgments that involve injustice", as well as examine "the texts used in primary schools, to correct the many errors they contain", and economics teachers were required to teach the fundamentals of Marxism.

Finally, a major battle against illiteracy was launched, creating "Cultural Militias" which, building on the experience of the Pedagogical Missions of the early Republican period, achieved effective results in teaching literacy to combatants. This led to the formation of additional groups such as the "Mobile Brigades (Spanish: Brigadas Volantes)" for the same task but behind the lines and it was complemented by short general education courses for the general public in major cities.

==== Dictatorship of Francisco Franco ====
After the victory of the rebel side, Francisco Franco imposed a dictatorship that renamed the department as Ministry of National Education and carried out a major purge of the Spanish teaching profession. At that time, the ministry was structured through the Undersecretariat and five directorates-general: University Education; Secondary Education; Professional and Technical Education; Primary Education; and Fine Arts. In 1939, the Directorate-General for Archives and Libraries and the Spanish National Research Council (CSIC) were established.

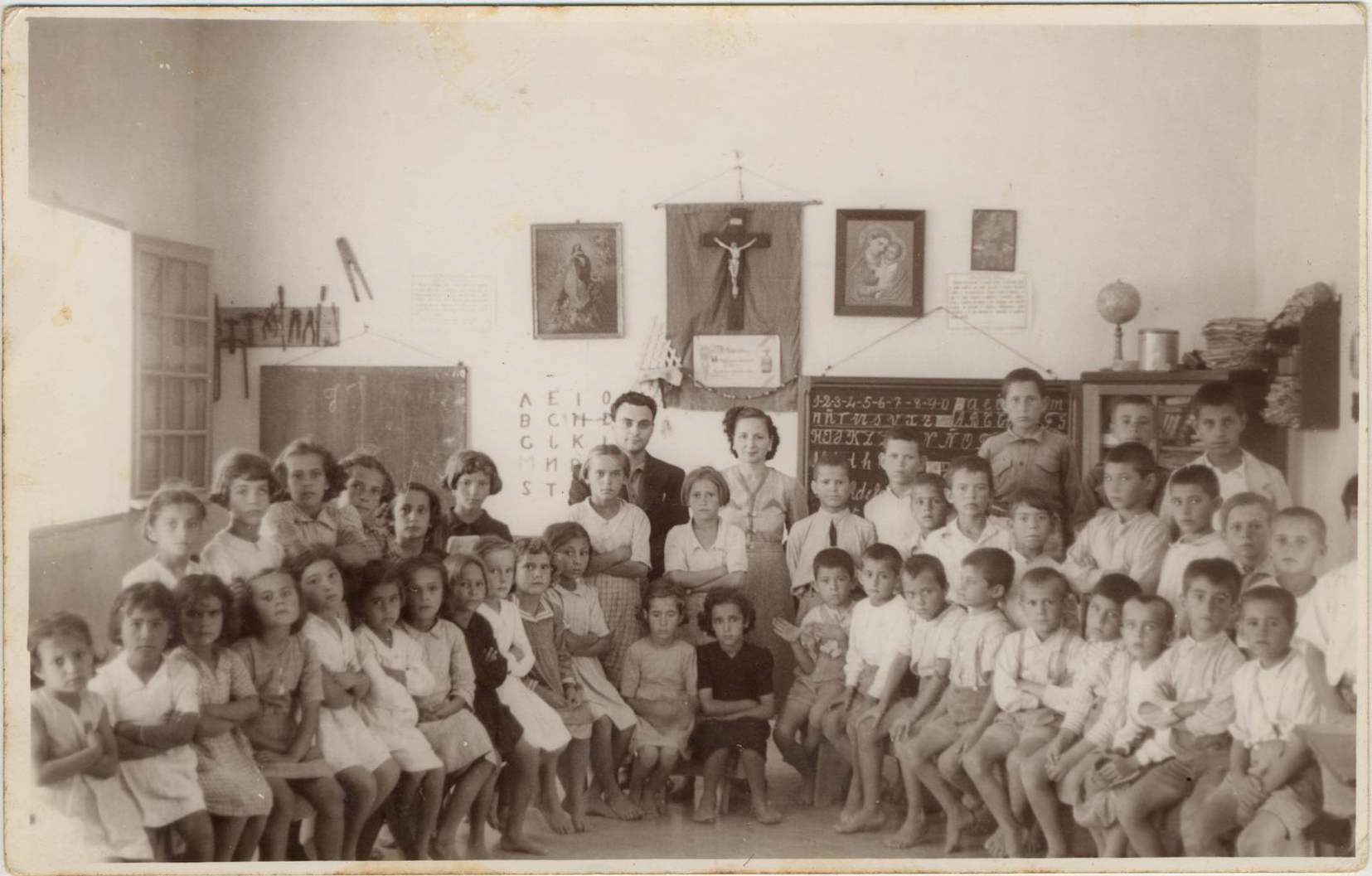
Students and teachers from a school in Arguineguín in 1939

The teaching policy of the dictatorship, similar to the last republican stage, was oriented to be a vehicle for transmitting ideology, so it does not have a relevant organizational development and the only rules are oriented towards guaranteeing a Catholic and patriotic education. In this sense, education becomes religious again, with the Catholic Church having the right to supervise it, and all subjects are ideologically oriented. Furthermore, the State delegates the teaching task to the Church and the single-sex education is reinstated.

Between 1938 and 1949 four new laws were passed regulating different aspects of education, all based on the aforementioned principles. These were: the Law for the Reform of Secondary Education (1938), the Law Regulating the Organization of the University (1943), the Law on Primary Education (1945), and the Law on Industrial Vocational Training (1949).

In the summer of 1951 the Ministry of Information and Tourism was created, and it assumed the cultural and propaganda responsibilities (press, broadcasting, cinematography and theater) for the rest of the dictatorship. However, the Education Department retained other cultural powers related to conservation of heritage, archives and libraries.

Through Law 35/1966, of May 31, the Department changed its name to Ministry of Education and Science, which would last three decades. According to statements by the education minister Manuel Lora-Tamayo, it was intended, following recommendations of the Council of Europe and the OECD, to enhance the scientific and research work of the Spanish Administration and put it in direct relation with the tertiary education. An Undersecretariat for Higher Education and Research was also created.

===== General Education Law of 1970 =====
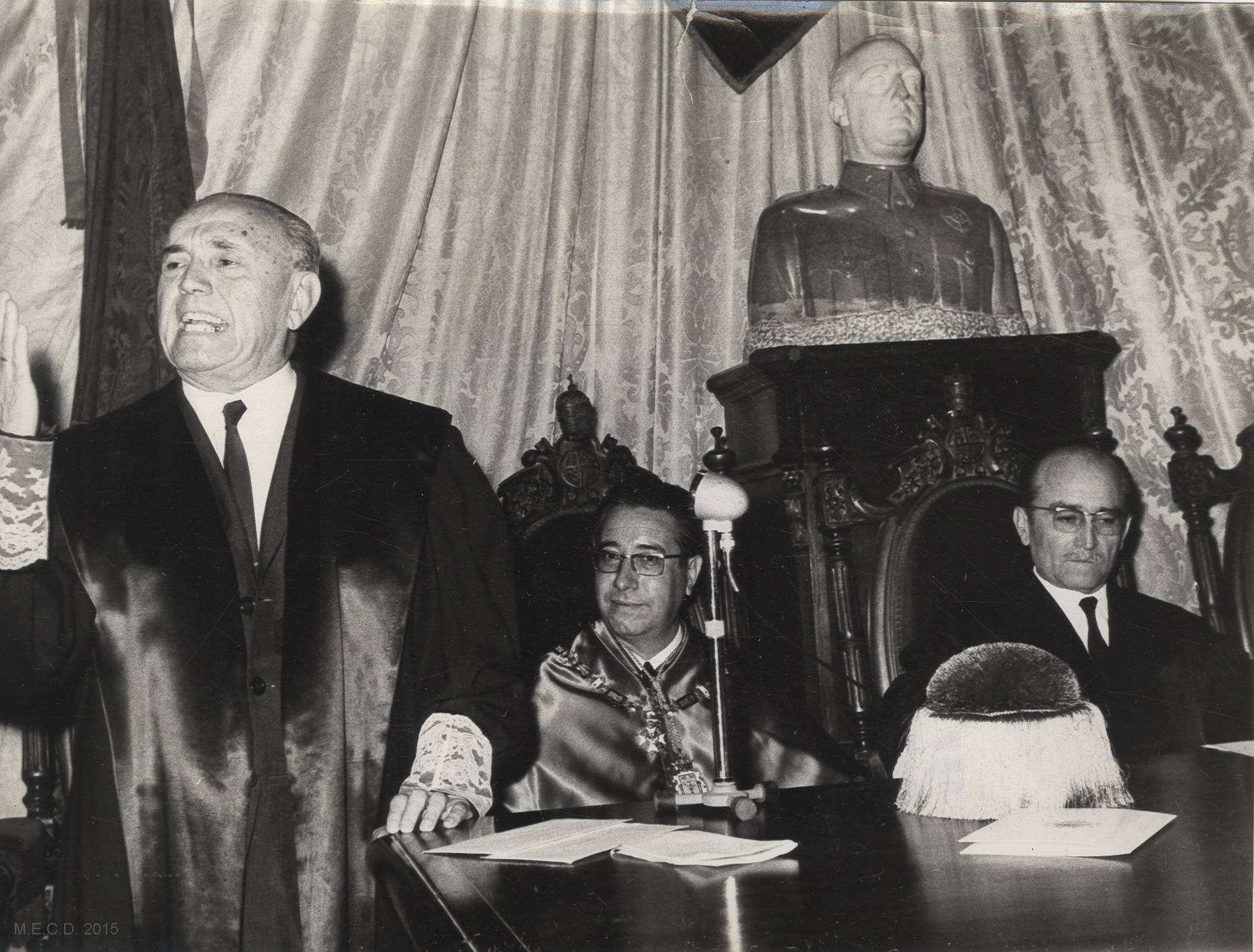
Minister Villar Palasí (center) at an event at the University of Oviedo. 1970s.

Since the 1960s, economic and social changes made clear the need for a major educational reform. This reform came in 1970 with the approval of the General Education Law, promoted by minister José Luis Villar Palasí. This law, which, among other things, completely repealed the Moyano Law of 1857, restructured the entire Spanish education system. This law divided it into four levels: Preschool, Basic General Education, Secondary Education, and University Education.

Furthermore, the law established a generalization of education from ages 6 to 14, put an end to the principle of subsidiarity of the State, that is, the State once again became the main authority on education, favored private education, attempted to establish a clear continuity between the teaching world and the working world, the former being a tool to reach the latter, and centralized teaching to give uniformity to the educational system.

Subsequently, in 1974 minister Cruz Martínez Esteruelas promoted the approval of the so-called "Esteruelas Law", which regulated the current university entrance exam for Spanish universities, although similar pre-university tests have existed in Spain since the 19th century.

==== 1978 Constitution ====
During the early years of King Juan Carlos I's reign, the monarch propelled the Spanish transition to democracy and in late 1978 the current Constitution of Spain was approved. This fundamental law established Spain as a democratic parliamentary monarchy and placed education under the complete control of public authorities, making it a basic right of citizens, with the aim of guaranteeing "the full development of the human personality in respect for the democratic principles of coexistence and for fundamental rights and freedoms". It guarantees the right of parents to have their children educated with the religious and moral formation they desire, permits private education "within the framework of constitutional principles", and promotes the participation of parents and students in public education administration. Finally, it constitutionally enshrines university autonomy.

In terms of its structure, it was also a time of change for the department. During the early years of democracy, the Ministry's powers were reduced for two main reasons: firstly, the Ministry of Culture was created (1977), which took over the remaining cultural policies—mainly those related to the protection and conservation of historical heritage—and also the Ministry of Universities and Research (1979), with scientific and university responsibilities; secondly, a process of decentralization of education was carried out in the regions, which created their own departments of education and assumed its management and inspection in their respective territories. Meanwhile, the central government reserved for itself the foundations, coordination and higher inspection of the education system.

===== LOGSE =====
Before the end of the 20th century, a new education law was passed, the Organic Law on the General Organization of the Education System (Spanish: Ley Orgánica de Ordenación General del Sistema Educativo, LOGSE). Approved in 1990, this rule extensively regulated preschool education, which became known as early childhood education (from ages 6 to 12), extended compulsory education to age 16—thus coinciding with the legal working age—, structured vocational education in two levels, established the obligation to teach the Catholic religion in schools, but made it voluntary for students, and promoted the teaching of fine arts. It also paid special attention to the inspection and quality of education, creating new regulatory bodies—such us the National Institute for Educational Evaluation—and setting limits on the number of students per classroom and educational level.

=== Present ===
==== Ideological disagreements in recent years ====
On January 1, 2003, a new education law came into force, the Organic Law on Education Quality (Spanish: Ley Orgánica de Calidad de la Educación, LOCE), although its implementation was not complete, since the change of government caused the new government to halt its implementation on April 30, 2004 and was formally repealed in May 2006.

This law divided eraly childhood education in two—from 0 to 3 years, with an educational-care character and from 3 to 6 years, with a purely educational character taught by teachers—, it modified the way school principals were appointed—it established that they were chosen after participating in a merit-based public competition, whereas previously they were chosen by the School Council— and religious education was mandatory but split in two options: confessional or non-confessional, so parents could choose between having their children study their religion or studying religions in a generic way.

As mentioned, this law was quickly repealed by the Organic Law on Education of 2006. This new law, like the previous one, was born out of disagreements between political ideologies rather than from necessary and relevant changes to the educational system (something that would recur from then on). It maintained the essentials in terms of structure, methodology, organization and operation, but modified the discrepancies regarding early childhood education, since it also gave educational character to the first level from 0 to 3 years and it established three options in religious teaching —confessional, non-confessional or neither of the above—; in addition, it also maintained the provisions regarding the new way of electing school principals. The most controversial aspect was the creation of a third option for religious education, as it created a new subject: Education for Citizenship. Both the conservatives parties and the Catholic Church opposed it.

In addition to the aforementioned disagreements, there have also been disagreements in recent years regarding the government organization. While conservative parties tend to consolidate educational, cultural, and scientific responsibilities into a single department, progressive governments typically divide these responsibilities among different departments.

===== LOMCE and LOMLOE =====
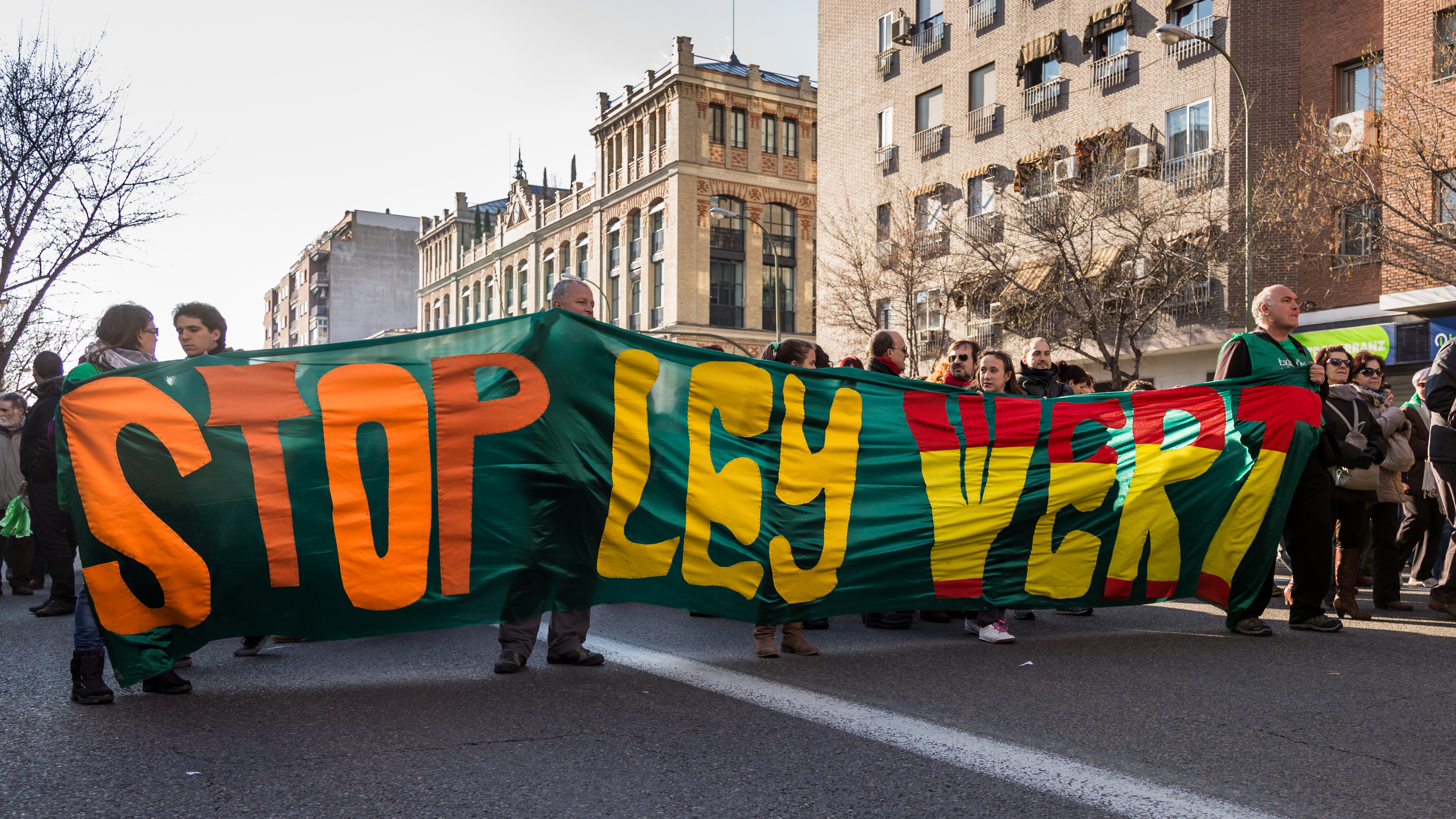
A protests against the "Wert Law" in 2013

In 2013 the new conservative government approved a new organic law, the LOMCE, also known as the "Wert Law" after its promoter, minister José Ignacio Wert. In the same session in which the government majority approved the law, the progressive opposition announced that it would repeal it as soon as the majorities changed. The most controversial aspects of the new law were establishing Spanish as the common language for teaching throughout the country, which provoked the rejection of nationalist and separatist parties, establishing evaluations at the end of every educational stage (suspended in 2016) and giving academic validity to religion.

These aspects were repealed by the LOMLOE, the new education law of 2020 —known as "Celaá Law" after minister Isabel Celaá—, which also formally banned single-sex education in public schools, promoted the presence of the opposite sex in studies with significant majorities of one sex and the teaching of the history of democracy and sex education.

In addition to the partisan controversies, it introduced a substantial change to the baccalaureate, which was divided into five. In addition to the tradicional Science and Technology and Humanities and Social Sciences tracks, the baccalaureate in Arts was divided in two—Performing Arts and Music, and Visual Arts, Image and Design— and a General Baccalaureate was created for those who did not want to pursue a specific one.

==== Vocational training ====
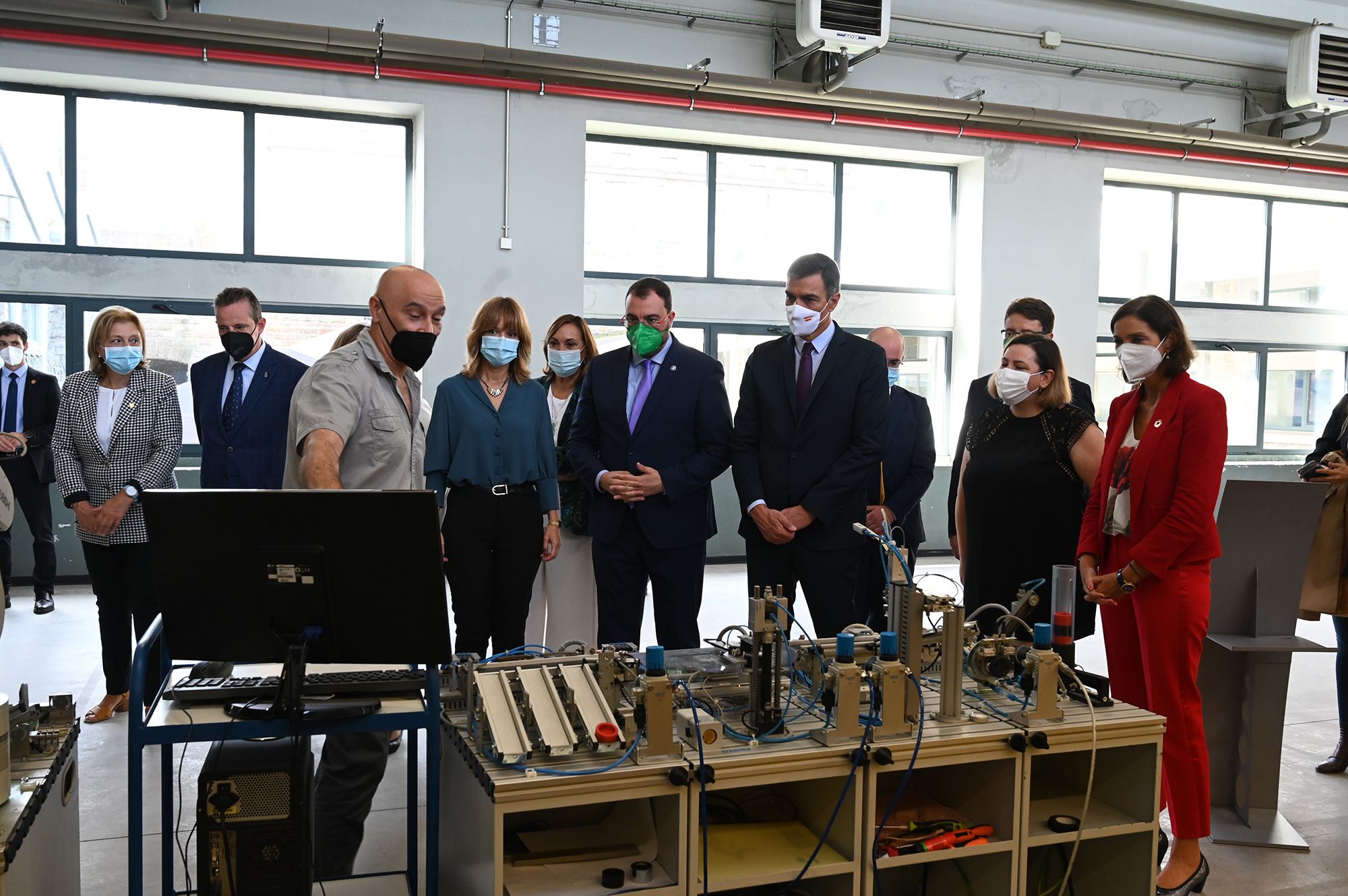
Prime Minister Pedro Sánchez, along with national and regional authorities, visits the Vocational Training Centre of the Universidad Laboral de Gijón. 2021.

During the 14th Cortes Generales (2019–2023), the socialist government made a strong commitment to vocational education, renaming the department as Ministry of Education and Vocational Training, transferring to it the powers in vocational training for employment that were held by the Ministry of Labour and elevating these responsibilities in rank by replacing the Directorate-General for Vocational Training with a General Secretariat for Vocational Training, with the rank of undersecretariat. To support these measures, in July 2020 the government announced a plan of €1.5 billion to modernize vocational training and accredit the skills of more than three million people, a trend that was maintained in subsequent years.

In September 2021, minister Pilar Alegría presented to the Cortes a bill on Organization and Integration of Vocational Training and was approved by both chambers between December 2021 and March 2022. This new vocational training law stands out for its promotion of dual education, that is, it combines student training with paid internships in companies, so that those who take advantage of this type of education accumulate work experience from the beginning. Also, in May 2023 the government created the Center for Innovation and High-Performance Technological Development of Vocational Training, a government agency focused on R&D&I applied to vocational and teacher training.

At the end of 2023 the department assumed the sports powers that had previously been exercised by the Ministry of Culture and Sport, and a new Directorate-General for Planning, Innovation and Management of Vocational Training was created.

== Organization ==
Organizational chart of the Spanish Ministry of Education, March 2024

The minister of Education, Vocational Training and Sports is the most senior official in the Department. A member of the Council of Ministers and appointed by the Monarch, on the advice of the Prime Minister, the minister establishes the ministry's policy and appoints other department officers.

The minister is assisted by a secretary of state for non-university educational affairs, a secretary-general, with the administrative rank of under-secretary, for vocational training matters, and the Ministry's under-secretary, as the most senior civil servant responsible for the department's day-to-day management. Also, the president of the National Sports Council (commonly referred to as Secretary of State for Sport), is attached to this ministry.

As of 2026, this is the organization of the Ministry:

Ministry Organization (2026)
| Minister | Cabinet (Chief of Staff) |
| Secretary of State for Education | Directorate-General for Evaluation and Territorial Cooperation |
| Secretary of State for Education | Directorate-General for Educational Planning and Management |
| Secretary-General for Vocational Training | Directorate-General for Planning, Innovation and Management of Vocational Training |
| Secretary-General for Vocational Training | Deputy Directorate-General for Vocational Training Organization |
| Secretary-General for Vocational Training | Deputy Directorate-General for Dual Education and Business Relations |
| Secretary-General for Vocational Training | Deputy Directorate-General for Evaluation and Quality |
| President of the National Sports Council – Secretary of State for Sports | President's Cabinet |
| President of the National Sports Council – Secretary of State for Sports | Directorate-General for Sports |
| President of the National Sports Council – Secretary of State for Sports | Deputy Directorate-General for Professional Sport and Financial Control |
| President of the National Sports Council – Secretary of State for Sports | Press Office |
| President of the National Sports Council – Secretary of State for Sports | Spanish Anti-Doping Agency |
| Under-Secretary | Technical General Secretariat |
| Under-Secretary | Budget Office |
| Under-Secretary | Administrative Office |
| Under-Secretary | Deputy Directorate-General for Human Resources |
| Under-Secretary | Deputy Directorate-General for Information and Communications Technologies |
| Under-Secretary | Deputy Directorate-General for Economic Management and the European Social Fund |
| Under-Secretary | Foreign Education Action Unit |
| Under-Secretary | Inspectorate-General of Services |

== Headquarters ==
The Ministry of Education is headquartered at 34 Alcalá street, in Madrid. The building was built in the final stage of the reign of Alfonso XIII on the site of the former Casa de los Heros, a building that housed various public and private entities, most notably the Office of the Prime Minister, which was located there between 1871 and 1914.

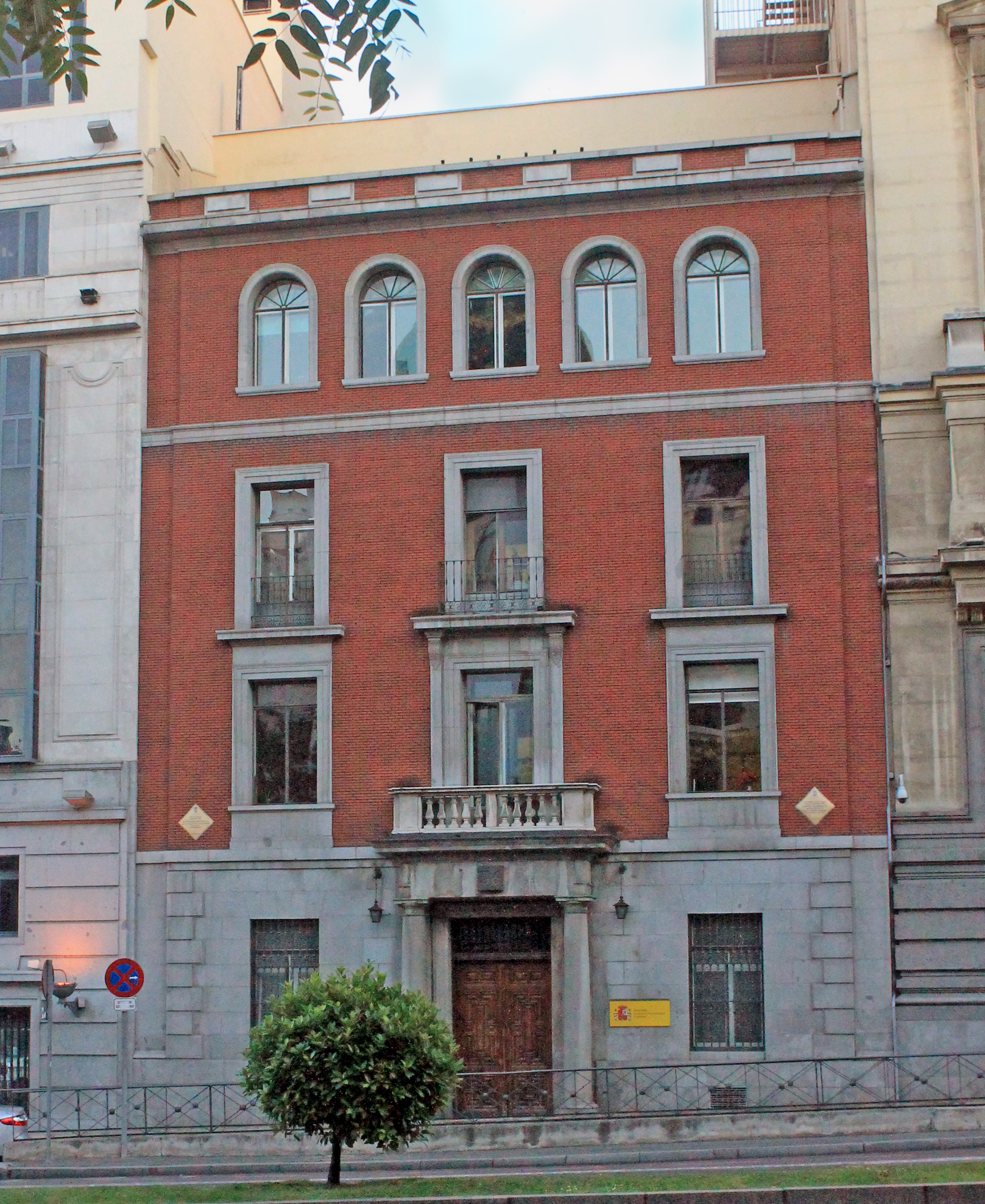
The Casita Pequeña (Little House, Alcalá 36). Since 1931, some of the Ministry's services are housed there.

La Casa de los Heros, along with the building at 36 Alcaldá street, were transferred to the Ministry of War in 1915 and subsequently to the Ministry of the Navy, which housed the Directorate-General for Navigation and Maritime Fishing in the latter. In 1916, the Ministry of Public Instruction requested the transfer of both properties from the Ministry of Finance, although initially only number 34 was ceded because, as mentioned, number 36 was occupied by services of the Ministry of the Navy, which was awaiting the completion of its new headquarters.

Architect Ricardo Velázquez Bosco, who had previously designed the Palacio de Fomento, was immediately commissioned to draft a new project. The Casa de los Heros was demolished, and the new building was erected between 1925 and 1929. The building was first occupied in November 1928. Finally, in 1931, and as originally planned by the architect Velázquez Bosco, the Ministry of the Navy ceded the adjacent building (Alcalá 36) to the Ministry of Public Instruction, which has since housed services of the department.

=== Former headquarters ===
In addition to its headquarters at Alcalá 34, the department was initially located—for almost 30 years—in another emblematic building: the Palacio de Fomento. As a spin-off from the Ministry of Development, both departments shared this building in the early years until the Ministry of Education moved to its current location in the late 1920s.

== Foreign education programs ==
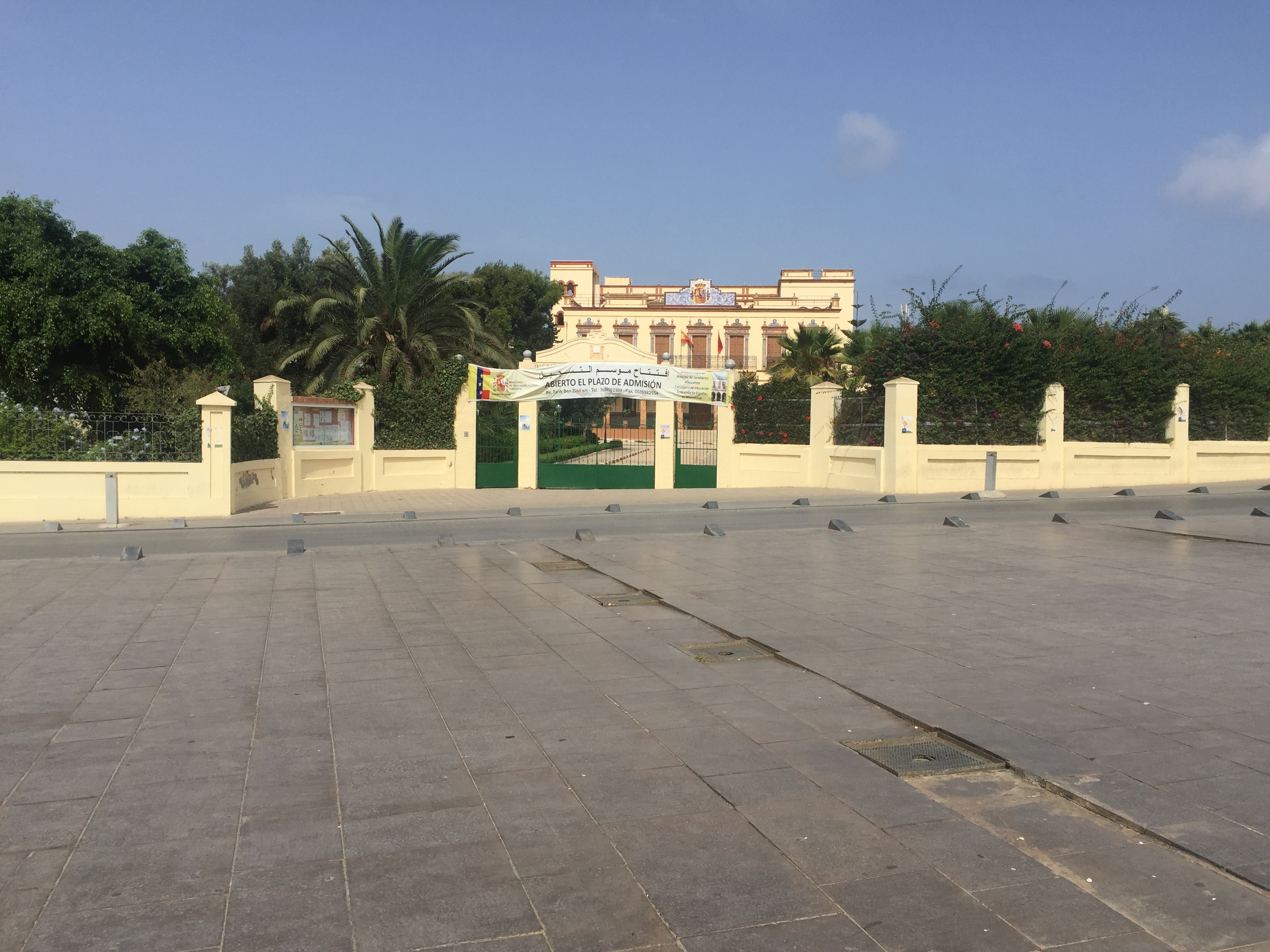
Melchor Jovellanos Spanish School in Alhucemas, Morocco.

The Ministry of Education has a significant educational network abroad. The ministry's foreign education policy is called Foreign Education Action (Spanish: Acción Educativa Exterior, AEE) and is mainly developed through the Education Offices abroad. This bodies are integrated into Spanish diplomatic missions that, among other objectives, are responsible for promoting the Spanish language and culture in the education system of the corresponding country, through agreements with education authorities and academic institutions, and the management of the AEE programs implemented in the country.

For all these reasons, the Ministry of Education is the second department, after the Ministry of Foreign Affairs, that contributes the most to the Spanish Foreign Service with almost 1,300 employees in January 2026. In addition, in the 2025–26 academic year, Spanish educational programs abroad include 8,686 teachers, serving 140,616 students worldwide.

The foreign education network is integrated by:

Foreign Education Action Units
| Type | Location | Amount |
|---|---|---|
| Education Office | Embassies to: Andorra, Argentina, Australia, Belgium, Brazil, Bulgaria, China, France, Germany, Italy, Morocco, Mexico, Poland, Portugal, Switzerland the United Kingdom and the United States. Special Offices: one for the OECD, UNESCO and CoE (located in Paris) and another for the European Union (located in Brussels). | 19 |
| Education Attaché | Brazil (2), Canada, Colombia, Czech Republic, Hungary, Romania, Russia, Slovakia and the United States (4) | 13 |
| Technical Advisory Office | Australia (2), Austria, Brazil (3), Canada (2), India, Ireland, Ivory Coast, New Zealand, the Netherlands, the Philippines, Scotland, Sweden, Thailand, Latvia, United Arab Emirates, and the United States (11). | 29 |
| Programs Directorate | Equatorial Guinea | 1 |
| Educational Resource Centre | Argentina, Australia, Belgium, Brazil, Bulgaria, Canada (4), China, the Czech Republic, Germany, Hungary, Italy, Luxembourg, Morocco, Mexico, the Netherlands, Poland, Portugal, Romania, Russia (2), Slovakia, Switzerland, Tunisia the United Kingdom and the United States (12). | 39 |
| School (full ownership) | Morocco (10), France (2), Andorra, Colombia, Italy, Portugal, United Kingdom and the Western Sahara. | 18 |
| School (host shared ownership) | Miguel de Cervantes Hispano-Brazilian School (São Paulo) and Spanish Park School (Rosario) | 2 |
| School (EU shared ownership) | Belgium (5), Germany (3), Italy, Luxembourg (2), the Netherlands and Spain | 13 |
| TOTAL AEE Network | | 134 |

=== International Spanish Academies ===
The ISA Program (International Spanish Academies) is a program of the Spanish Ministry of Education, initiated in 1999 in the United States and currently also developed in Canada and Australia, which consists of introducting "bilingual sections" in some education centers of these countries to establish an immersive education in the Spanish language. In this way, the main objective of the program is to ensure the teaching of the language in English-speaking centers.

For the 2025–26 academic year, the ISA Program was present in the three countries mentioned above with 127 bilingual sections and 48,553 students.

Since 1988, the Spanish government has had a similar program for Central and Eastern European countries, as well as for China. This program, called "Bilingual Sections" and present in eight countries, provided instruction to 32,814 students in the 2025–26 academic year.

== Budget ==
In millions of euros (€)
1. Education policy 1,720.5 (25.4%)
2. Scholarships and study grants 2,549.8 (37.6%)
3. Vocational training 2,027.3 (29.9%)
4. Sports 391 (5.77%)
5. Administration, management and general affairs 86.5 (1.28%)

As mentioned above, the Spanish education system is decentralized and the Spanish regions are responsible for educational policies. For this reason, the Education Ministry—and the Science Ministry—budget represents around 7 % of total Spanish education spending. For fiscal year 2023, extended to 2026, the Ministry of Education has a consolidated budget of €6.78 billion, while the total education expenditure of all administrations in 2024 was €71.06 billion (Note: This number includes spending on university education, which is about €12.7 billion.), which represented a 4.46 % of GDP.

The Ministry participates in 24 programs of the General State Budget. Among the regular programs, Program 323M "Scholarships and grants for students", with a budget of almost 2.55 billion euros, Program 241B "Vocational Training for Employment," with 1.18 billion euros, and Program 322B "Secondary Education, Vocational Training and Official Language Schools" which manages 584.4 million euros, stand out.

=== Audit ===
The Ministry's accounts, as well as those of its agencies, are internally audited by the Office of the Comptroller General of the State (IGAE), through a Delegated Comptroller's Office within the Department itself. Externally, the Court of Auditors is responsible for auditing expenditures. Likewise, the Congress of Deputies and Senate Education and Sports Committees exercise political control over the accounts.

== See also ==
- Rover Environmental Monitoring Station
- Education in Spain
- Higher education in Spain
- List of universities in Spain

== Bibliography ==
- Álvarez Lázaro, Pedro F. (director) (2001). Fundación BBVA (ed.). "Cien años de educación en España: en torno a la creación del Ministerio de Instrucción Pública y Bellas Artes" [One hundred years of education in Spain: around the creation of the Ministry of Public Instruction and Fine Arts]. Ministry of Education, Culture and Sport (in Spanish): 477–491. ISBN 84-369-3429-6.
- Montero Alcaide, Antonio (June 2009). "Una ley centenaria: La ley de instrucción pública (Ley Moyano, 1857)" [A century-old law: The Public Instruction Law (Moyano Law, 1857)] (PDF). Cabás (in Spanish) (1): 108–111. ISSN 1989-5909.
