= Carlos Velázquez (politician) =

Spanish politician

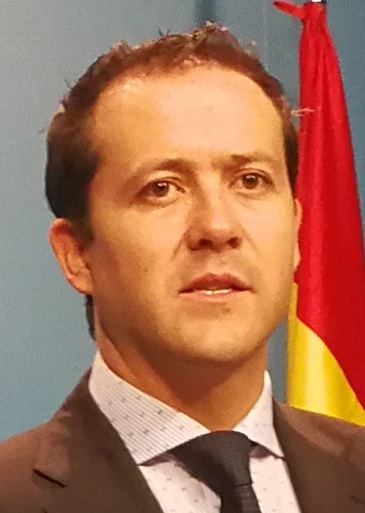

Carlos Velázquez Romo (born 1980) is a Spanish People's Party (PP) politician. He was elected to the town council in Seseña in the Province of Toledo in 2007 and served as its mayor from 2011 to 2019. From 2012 to 2019, he was a deputy in the Cortes of Castilla–La Mancha. In 2023, he was elected to the city council in Toledo and became the mayor.

== Biography ==
Born in Toledo, Castilla–La Mancha, Velázquez graduated in law from the University of Castilla–La Mancha. After working in the private sector, he contested the 2007 Spanish local elections as leader of the People's Party (PP) list in the town of Seseña, where they came second; he was also elected to the Provincial Deputation of Toledo and kept his seat until 2012. In the 2011 local elections, he became mayor.

In January 2012, Velázquez was sworn in as a deputy in the Cortes of Castilla–La Mancha representing the Toledo constituency, after Jesús Labrador resigned to take the role as government delegate in the region. He was re-elected in 2015. In the 2019 local elections, he lost his mayoralty to Silvia Fernández of the Spanish Socialist Workers' Party (PSOE). In September 2018, after the resignation of María Dolores de Cospedal, he ran for president of the People's Party of Castilla–La Mancha, taking 35.11% of the vote against Francisco Núñez.

In July 2021, Velázquez ran unopposed to be president of the PP in his home province. The following January, he returned to the Provincial Deputation, where he was proposed as party spokesperson but refused it.

Velázquez was announced in December 2022 as the PP candidate for mayor of Toledo in the 2023 Spanish local elections. In the May elections, the PSOE of incumbent mayor Milagros Tolón came first with 11 out of 25 seats while the PP gained three seats to reach nine. Velázquez began negotiations with the four councillors from Vox in order to form a majority. With the combined votes from the nine PP councillors and the four from Vox, he was installed as mayor.
