= Víctor Javier Ruiz de Diego =

Spanish politician (born 1967)

Member of the Congress of Deputies
- Incumbent
- Assumed office 12 December 2023
- Preceded by: Pilar Alegría
- Constituency: Zaragoza

Member of the Senate
- In office 21 May 2019 – 16 August 2023
- Constituency: Zaragoza

Personal details
- Born: 1 March 1967 (age 59)
- Party: Spanish Socialist Workers' Party

Víctor Javier Ruiz de Diego (born 1 March 1967) is a Spanish politician serving as a member of the Congress of Deputies since 2023. From 2019 to 2023, he was a member of the Senate.
