= Amalio Gimeno, 1st Count of Gimeno =

Spanish nobleman, physician, scientist and politician

The Most Excellent Amalio Gimeno 1st Count of Gimeno
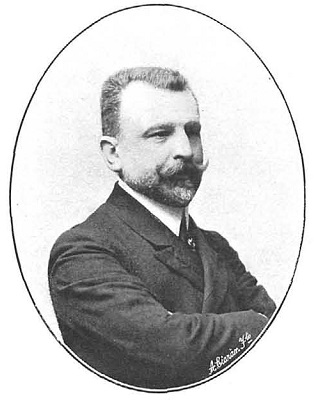
- Born: Amalio Gimeno y Cabañas; 31 May 1852; Cartagena, Spain
- Died: 13 September 1936 (aged 84); Madrid, Spain

Seat c of the Real Academia Española
- In office 5 June 1927 – 13 September 1936
- Preceded by: Daniel Cortázar
- Succeeded by: Pedro Sainz Rodríguez

Amalio Gimeno y Cabañas, 1st Count of Gimeno (31 May 1852, in Cartagena, Spain – 13 September 1936, in Madrid) was a Spanish nobleman, physician, scientist and politician who served as Minister of Estate, Minister of Gobernación and Minister of Marine of Spain.

== Life and career ==
=== Scientific career ===
Gimeno studied medicine at the Universidad Central de Madrid and held professorships in pathology at the University of Santiago de Compostela (1875) and in therapeutics at the University of Valencia (1877). There, his lectures is noted for including an early course on cannabis and hashish. He moved to Madrid in 1888 to take the chair of hygiene at the Universidad Central, transferring to medical pathology in 1891.

=== Cholera outbreak and diffusion of vaccineation ===
During the 1885 cholera epidemic in Spain he implemented mass vaccination based on the theories of Robert Koch and Jaime Ferrán. He later directed the National Institute of Bacteriology and Hygiene (1894) and presided over the Royal National Academy of Medicine.

=== Political career ===
A member of the Liberal Party, Gimeno was elected deputy for Alcira (Valencia region) in 1886 and later sat in the Senate, becoming a senator for life in 1908.

He served as Minister of Public Instruction and Fine Arts (1906; 1911–1912), Minister of Marine (1912–1913; 1917–1918), Minister of Estate ("Ministro de Estado", equivalent to foreign affairs, 1916–1917), Minister of Gobernación (high-ranking, almost equivalent to Prime Minister, 1918–1919) and Minister of Public Works ("Ministro de Fomento", 1919–1920).

On 13 January 1917, at the World War I was nearing its end, the Ministro de Estado Gimeno authored a cablegram to the "League to Enforce Peace" stating:

His Majesty's Government is following with keen sympathy the idea of establishing, after the end of the present war, an international league for the purpose of preventing the peace of the world being again disturbed, and when the opportunity of doing so arrives, with a guarantee of success, will lend its concourse to the realization of such a humanitarian and lofty project.

Spanish nobility
New creation	Count of Gimeno; 1920–1936	Succeeded by Amalio Gimeno
