= José Francos Rodríguez =

Spanish politician and journalist (1862–1931)

The Most Excellent José Francos Rodríguez
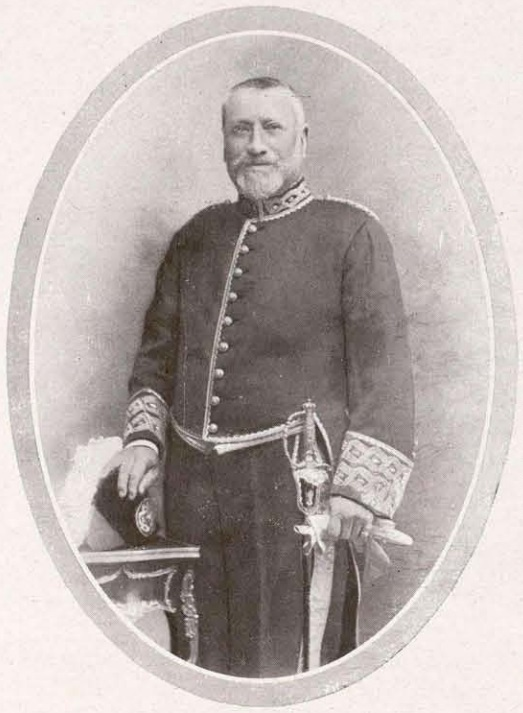
- Portrait by Kaulak
- Born: 5 April 1862; Madrid, Spain
- Died: 11 December 1931 (aged 69); Madrid, Spain

Seat D of the Real Academia Española
- In office 16 November 1924 – 11 December 1931
- Preceded by: Jacinto Octavio Picón
- Succeeded by: Niceto Alcalá-Zamora

José Francos Rodríguez (5 April 1862 – 11 December 1931) was a Spanish politician and journalist. He served as Mayor of Madrid as well as Minister of Public Instruction and Fine Arts and Minister of Grace and Justice during the reign of Alfonso XIII.

== Biography ==
Born on 5 April 1862 in Madrid to a humble family, his father was car driver. He graduated as physician and worked as such for a decade. A Mason and adept to liberal views, he became a journalist, writer and politician.

He was Mayor of Madrid for a first spell from 10 February 1910 to 16 March 1912.

Appointed as Civil Governor of the Province of Barcelona in June 1913, he faced the strike initiated by the textile workers of La Constancia in the summer of 1913 taking a role as mediator in the conflict.

From April to June 1917, he was Minister of Public Instruction and Fine Arts in a cabinet presided by Manuel García Prieto.

He served again as Mayor of the Spanish capital from 17 June 1917 to 30 April 1918.

He was President of the Press Association of Madrid from 1920 to 1931.

He served as Minister of Grace and Justice from August 1921 to March 1922 in the fifth government of Antonio Maura.

He became a member of the Spanish Royal Academy on 16 November 1924.

He died on 13 July 1931 at calle de Valenzuela 4, Madrid.

Political offices
Preceded by Alberto Aguilera	Mayor of Madrid; 10 February 1910 – 16 March 1912	Succeeded by Joaquín Ruiz Jiménez
Preceded by Juan Sánchez Anido	Civil Governor of Barcelona; June 1913 – October 1913	Succeeded by Rafael Andrade Navarrete
Preceded by Julio Burell y Cuéllar	Minister of Public Instruction and Fine Arts; April 1917 to June 1917	Succeeded by Manuel Burgos y Mazo
Preceded by Luis Silvela	Mayor of Madrid; 17 June 1917 – 30 April 1918	Succeeded by Luis Garrido Juaristi
Preceded by Julio Wais San Martín	Minister of Grace and Justice; August 1921 – March 1922	Succeeded by Mariano Ordóñez García
