= José Ignacio Wert =

Spanish politician (born 1950)

José Ignacio Wert Ortega
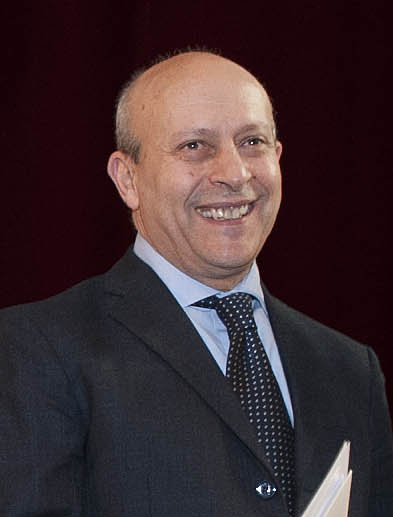
- Wert in 2012

Minister of Education, Culture and Sport
- In office 22 December 2011 – 25 June 2015
- President: Mariano Rajoy
- Preceded by: Ángel Gabilondo (Education); Ángeles González-Sinde (Culture)
- Succeeded by: Íñigo Méndez de Vigo

Personal details
- Born: 18 February 1950 (age 76) Madrid, Madrid, Spain
- Party: Independent (linked to the People's Party)

José Ignacio Wert Ortega (born 18 February 1950) is a Spanish politician. On 22 December 2011, he was appointed Minister of Education, Culture and Sport by the Prime Minister of Spain, Mariano Rajoy. He resigned on 25 June 2015 and was succeeded by Íñigo Méndez de Vigo.

== Biography ==
José Ignacio Wert studied at the Colegio Santa María del Pilar in Madrid.

He was a member of the Democratic Left until 1977, when he left the party to join the Union of the Democratic Centre (UCD), where he held positions in several public bodies.

In 1978, he was appointed head of the Studies Service, which oversaw both the Content Studies and the Audience Research departments. In 1979, he became assistant director-general of the Technical Cabinet of the Centro de Investigaciones Sociológicas (CIS), the Spanish public agency for sociological research, reporting to the Presidency of the Government. In 1980, on a proposal from the UCD, the Senate appointed him a member of the Advisory Council of the Spanish Radio and Television Corporation.

== Minister of Education, Culture and Sport ==
On 22 December 2011, Wert was appointed Minister of Education, Culture and Sport. On 31 January 2012, his reform project for general secondary education was announced. Under the proposal, compulsory secondary education would be shortened, while the Bachillerato stage would be extended by one year, increasing from two to three years. This required the removal of the fourth year of compulsory secondary education. Trade unions opposed the measure, expressing concern about a possible process of privatisation. Some teachers and other groups also criticised the proposal, citing its high costs and uncertainty about its effectiveness.

The reform was viewed as connected to the LOCE, passed under the previous government of the People's Party, led by José María Aznar. The LOCE was never implemented due to the arrival of José Luis Rodríguez Zapatero's government, which instead introduced a new Organic Law on Education.

Wert also authorised renewed subsidies for the Diccionario Biográfico Español (Biographical Spanish Dictionary), published by the Spanish Royal Academy of History, allocating €193,000 despite controversy surrounding certain entries. One example was the biography of General Francisco Franco, in which the author did not describe him as a dictator and omitted reference to much of the period of repression. In July 2011, the Congress of Deputies passed a motion calling for the withdrawal of funding unless errors were corrected. A month earlier, the Academy had been required to establish a commission to review the content. However, on 26 May 2012, according to El País, the Academy decided not to correct or replace existing biographies, limiting changes to minor amendments in a final addendum, while leaving the online version unchanged.

=== Replacement of Education for Citizenship ===
On 31 January 2012, Wert announced that the subject Education for Citizenship, which had been criticised by the Catholic Church and by the People's Party, would be replaced by a new subject called Civil and Constitutional Education. According to the minister, the new course would be "free of controversial issues" and would not be "capable of any ideological recruitment". Catholic parents' associations supported the decision.

According to El País, the revised curriculum avoided references to homophobia and social inequalities, while including criticism of what it described as "exclusionary nationalism". It also placed greater emphasis on private economic activity as a factor in "the creation of wealth", and promoted respect for "intellectual property".

=== Cuts and general strike in the public education sector on 22 May 2012 ===
On 17 May 2012, the Congress of Deputies ratified a government decree reducing public expenditure on education and health, with estimated savings of more than €10 billion (€7.2 billion in health and €3.7 billion in education), in order to meet the deficit target set by the European Union. The measure was supported exclusively by deputies of the People's Party.

On 22 May 2012, a general strike was held across the education sector, covering all levels from nursery school to university. It was the first nationwide strike in the history of Spain's public education system. Organised by teachers' unions and student organisations, the strike was a protest against the Ministry of Education's measures, which, according to critics, threatened the future of public education. Wert stated that the objective of the reforms was to reduce education spending in order to comply with the EU deficit target.

Key measures included increasing the maximum number of pupils per classroom (from 25 to 30 in primary education, from 30 to 36 in secondary education, and from 35 to 42 in Bachillerato). Other measures involved raising teaching hours (in addition to salary cuts imposed by most autonomous communities), not covering sick leave of less than 15 days, and increasing university tuition fees. Fees of up to €350 were also introduced for advanced vocational training programmes.

Political offices
Preceded by Ángel Gabilondo	Minister of Education; 2011–2015	Succeeded by Íñigo Méndez de Vigo
Preceded by Ángeles González-Sinde	Minister of Culture; 2011–2015	Succeeded by Íñigo Méndez de Vigo
