= Milagros Tolón =

Spanish politician (born 1968)

The Most Excellent Milagros Tolón
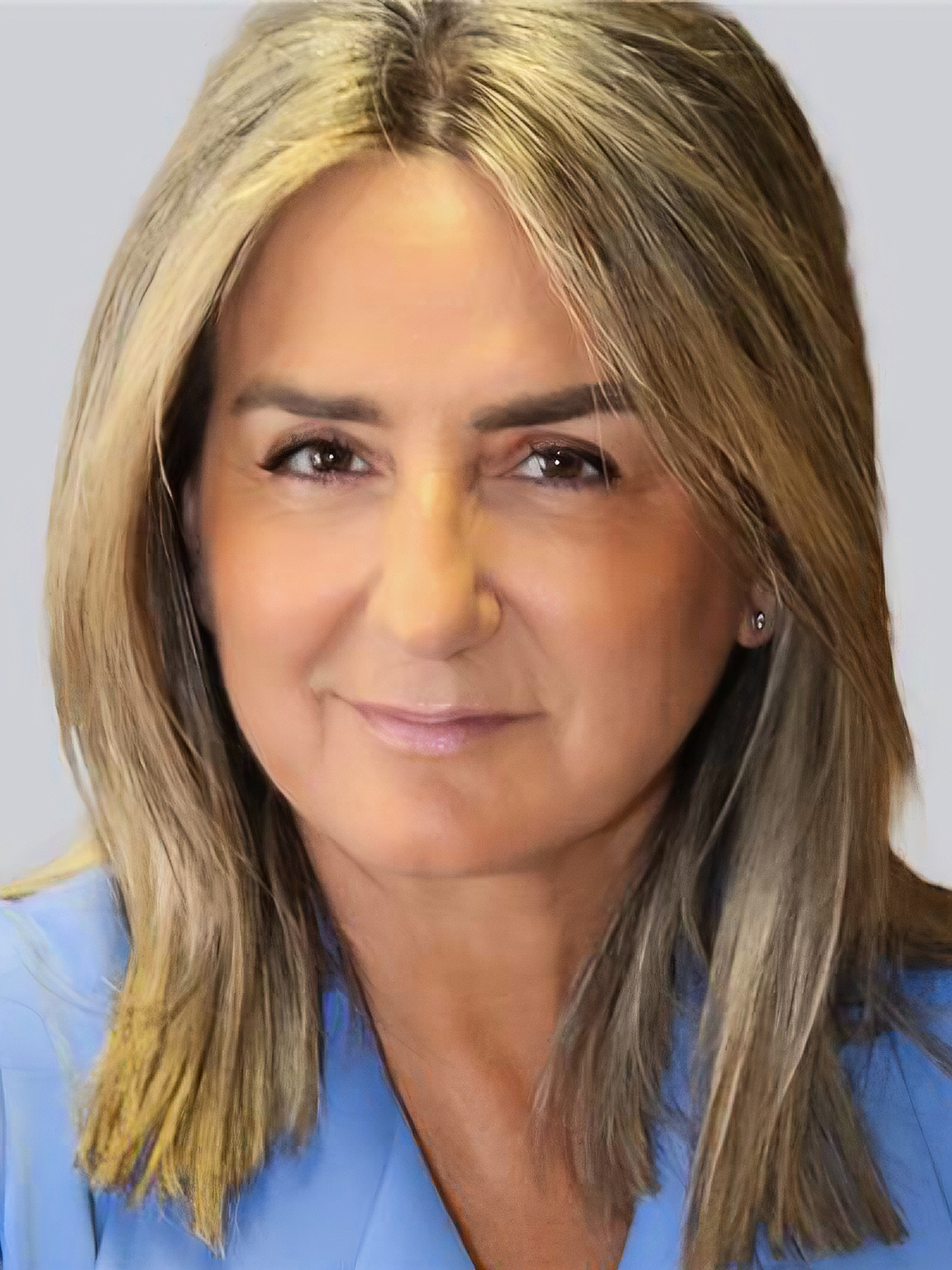
- Tolón in 2025

Minister of Education, Vocational Training and Sports
- Incumbent
- Assumed office 22 December 2025
- Monarch: Felipe VI
- Prime Minister: Pedro Sánchez
- Preceded by: Pilar Alegría

Mayor of Toledo
- In office 13 June 2015 – 17 June 2023
- Preceded by: Emiliano García-Page
- Succeeded by: Carlos Velázquez

Personal details
- Born: 25 March 1968 (age 58)
- Party: Spanish Socialist Workers' Party

Milagros Tolón Jaime (born 25 March 1968) is a Spanish politician serving as minister of education since December 2025.

Previously, she served as government delegate in Castilla–La Mancha since 2023. From 2015 to 2023, she served as mayor of Toledo. From 2011 to 2015, she was a member of the Cortes of Castilla–La Mancha. In 2023, she was a member of the Congress of Deputies.
