= Pilar Alegría =

Spanish politician (born 1977)

The Most Excellent Pilar Alegría
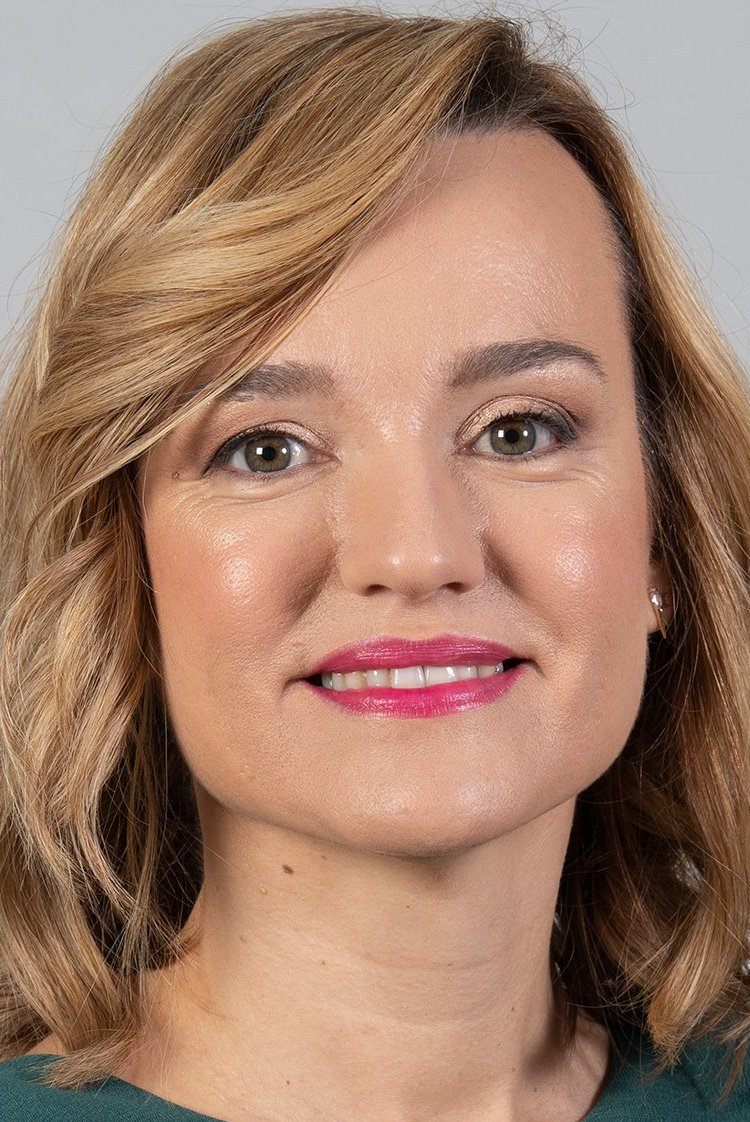
- Official portrait, 2023

Minister of Education, Vocational Training and Sports
- In office 12 July 2021 – 22 December 2025
- Monarch: Felipe VI
- Prime Minister: Pedro Sánchez
- Preceded by: Isabel Celaá
- Succeeded by: Milagros Tolón

Spokesperson of the Government
- In office 21 November 2023 – 22 December 2025
- Prime Minister: Pedro Sánchez
- Preceded by: Isabel Rodríguez García
- Succeeded by: Elma Saiz
Regional offices
Secretary general of the Socialists' Party of Aragon
Incumbent
Assumed office 16 March 2025
President	Marcelino Iglesias
Preceded by	Javier Lambán
Delegate of the Government of Spain in Aragon
In office 12 February 2020 – 11 July 2021
Prime Minister	Pedro Sánchez
Preceded by	Carmen Sánchez Pérez
Succeeded by	Rosa Serrano Sierra
Minister of Innovation, Research and Universities of Aragon
In office 5 July 2015 – 7 August 2019
President	Javier Lambán
Preceded by	Dolores Serrat
Succeeded by	Maru Díaz
Parliamentary and municipal seats
Member of the Congress of Deputies
In office 17 August 2023 – 1 December 2023
Succeeded by	Víctor Javier Ruiz de Diego
Constituency	Zaragoza
In office 1 April 2008 – 18 June 2015
Constituency	Zaragoza
Member of Zaragoza City Council
In office 15 June 2019 – 10 February 2020
Member of the Cortes of Aragon
Incumbent
Assumed office 3 March 2026
In office 18 June 2015 – 20 June 2019
Constituency	Zaragoza

Personal details
- Born: 1 November 1977 (age 48) La Zaida, Aragon, Spain
- Party: Spanish Socialist Workers' Party

María del Pilar Alegría Continente (pronounced [piˈlaɾ aleˈɣɾi.a]; born 1 November 1977) is a Spanish Socialist Workers' Party politician who served as minister of Education from July 2021 to December 2025, and as Spokesperson of the Government from November 2023 to December 2025.

Alegría was a deputy in the Congress of Deputies from 2008 to 2015, then Minister of Innovation, Research and Universities of Aragon in the Government of Aragon from 2015 to 2019. She was the PSOE candidate for mayor in the 2019 Zaragoza municipal election, in which her party won the plurality of votes, but other parties elected Jorge Azcón as mayor. In February 2020, she was named Government Delegate to Aragon.

In 2025, Alegría was proclaimed secretary-general of the PSOE in Aragon, and left her government roles in order to contest the 2026 Aragonese regional election.

== Early and personal life ==
Alegría was born in La Zaida, a village of around 500 inhabitants in the Province of Zaragoza. She said that her childhood home was largely non-political but slightly right-leaning, though her mother became a supporter of Pedro Sánchez.

Alegría qualified as a primary teacher through the University of Zaragoza and obtained a master's degree in education from the Complutense University of Madrid. Alegría never worked as a teacher, instead having jobs in agriculture and restaurants as well as within trade unions; at the end of the 1990s she joined the Unión General de Trabajadores (UGT) and through it the Spanish Socialist Workers' Party (PSOE). Alegría has kept her personal life private, and as of 2026 it was only known that she had a son of school age.

== Political career ==
=== Congress of Deputies and Minister of the Government of Aragon (2008–2019) ===
Alegría entered national politics when she was elected to the Congress of Deputies as a deputy for Zaragoza province as the second placed candidate on the PSOE list. At 30, she was one of the youngest members of parliament.

In July 2015, Alegría was named Minister of Innovation, Research and Universities in the Government of Aragon, led by Javier Lambán. She managed to get the Pact for Science signed by all parties in the Cortes of Aragon, and in 2016 achieved a €780 million budget for the University of Zaragoza for the following four years. During the 2016 PSOE crisis, Alegría backed Susana Díaz over Pedro Sánchez.

=== Zaragoza City Council (2019–2020) ===
Alegría was elected in September 2018 as the PSOE's candidate for mayor of Zaragoza in the 2019 election, having taken 49% in the first round of the primary election and her nearest opponent withdrawing from the second round. Her list was the most voted, and received 10 of the 31 seats on the council, but Jorge Azcón of the People's Party (PP) was installed as mayor with the support of his eight councillors, the six of Citizens and two of Vox, giving the right the majority of the council.

=== Minister of Education (2021–2025) ===
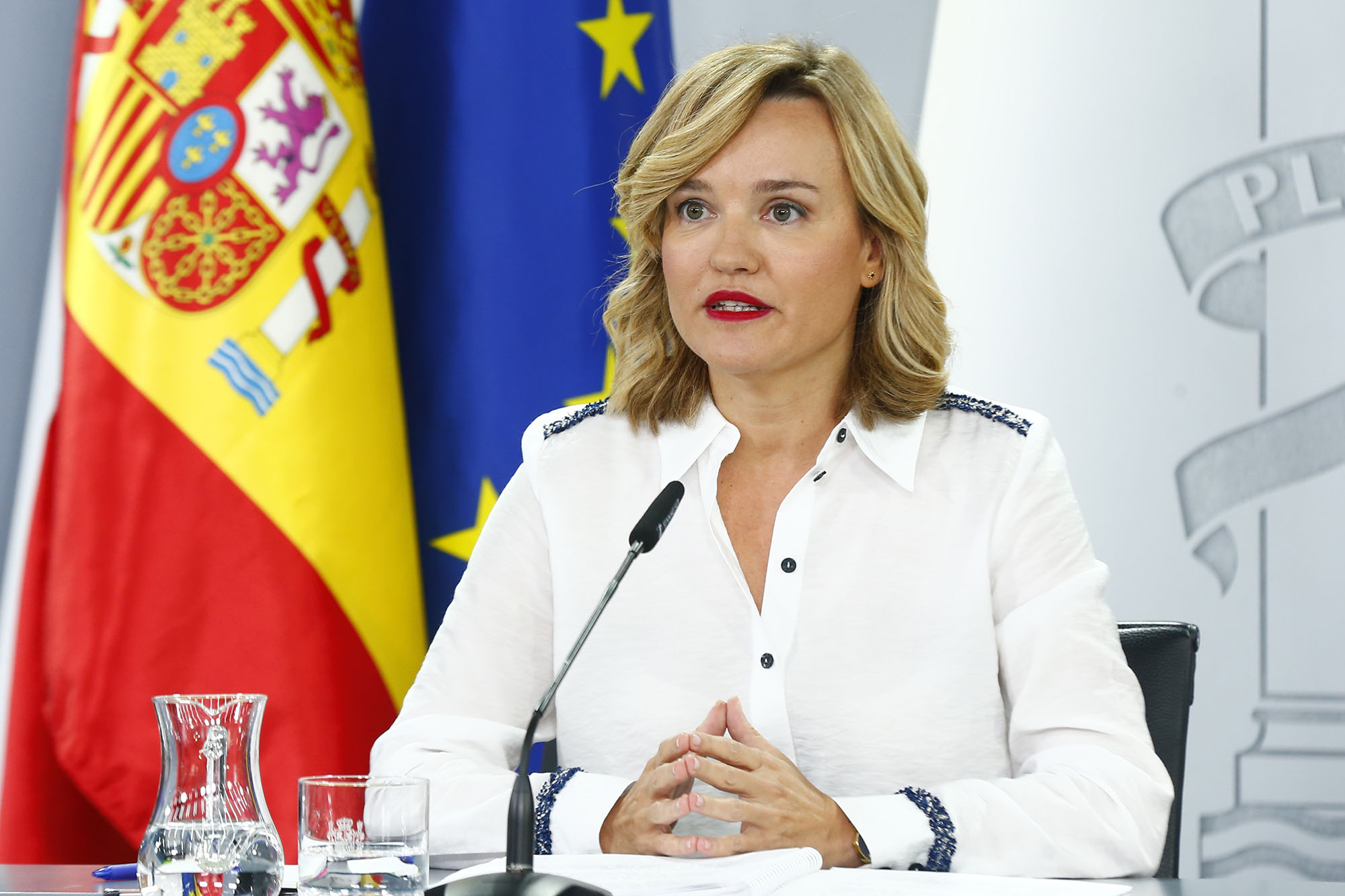
Algería in a press briefing in 2024

In February 2020, Alegría quit her council seat upon being named the Government Delegate to Aragon. She was named Minister of Education, Vocational Training and Sports in July 2021, in the government of prime minister Pedro Sánchez. Alegría's time in the ministry coincided with the third wave of the COVID-19 pandemic in Spain. She created 65,000 free state education places for under-4s, promoted education in co-official languages of Spain, and worked on reform of the university entrance exam.

Alegría was named at the top of the PSOE's list in Zaragoza for the 2023 Spanish general election. In November, having been named Spokesperson of the Government, she resigned her parliamentary seat to concentrate on her ministerial work.

=== Secretary of PSOE in Aragon (2025–) ===
In January 2025, Alegría was proclaimed secretary general of the Socialists' Party of Aragon, succeeding Lambán after the withdrawal of the only other candidate. Eleven months later, Azcón as President of the Government of Aragon called a snap election; she left her ministerial post in order to contest the election as the PSOE candidate. In this election, the PSOE finished in second place, with 18 seats, matching its worst historical result, while the PP and Vox retained a majority of seats.
