= Spanish education system =

The Spanish education system is composed of five levels of education:

- Infant education (between 0 and 6 years) is not compulsory; there are two stages (1º cycle is 0 to 3 years old and 2º cycle is 3 to 6 years old).
- Primary education (between 6 and 12 years old) is compulsory (and, due to this, is free in public institutions, including the text books in some autonomous communities).
- Secondary education (ESO is the acronym in Spanish) contains four separate years for students between 12 and 16.
- Post-compulsory secondary education refers to the four types of courses independent of each other and require the student to have obtained the ESO qualification available: the Bachillerato (two courses), visual arts and design and sport.
- Higher education (with distinctive criteria to access this, depending on the course chosen) covers, in an independent manner, university education, higher arts courses, higher professional formation, higher visual arts and design, and higher sports.
- Special courses are languages, the arts, and sport.
