= Isabel Celaá =

Spanish politician

The Most Excellent Isabel Celaá
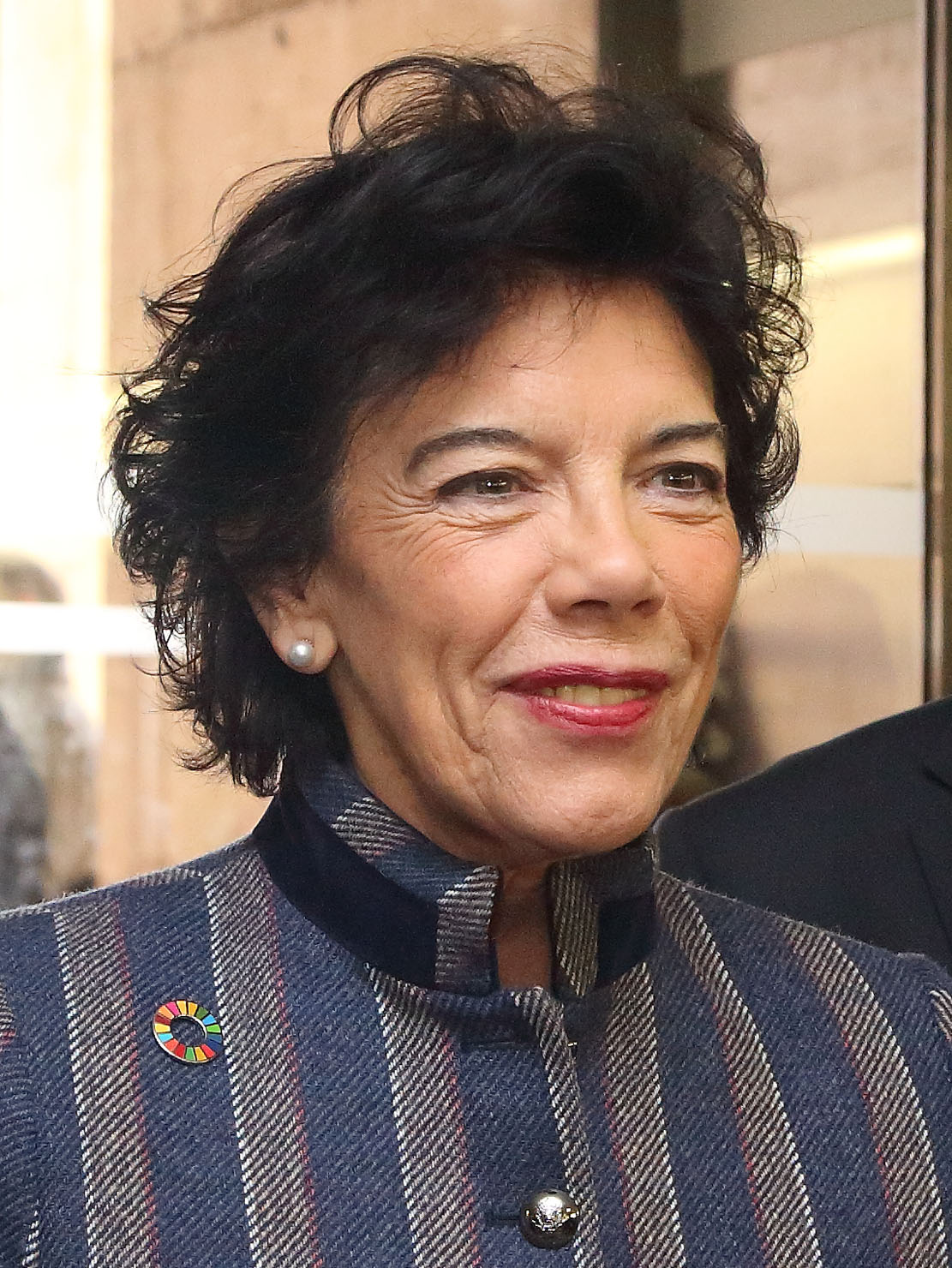
- In February 2019

Ambassador of Spain to the Holy See and the Order of Malta
- Incumbent
- Assumed office 26 January 2022 (Note: Order of Malta since 2 March 2022)
- Preceded by: María del Carmen de la Peña

Minister of Education and Vocational Training
- In office 7 June 2018 – 11 July 2021
- Monarch: Felipe VI
- Prime Minister: Pedro Sánchez
- Preceded by: Íñigo Méndez de Vigo
- Succeeded by: Pilar Alegría

Spokesperson of the Government
- In office 7 June 2018 – 13 January 2020
- Preceded by: Íñigo Méndez de Vigo
- Succeeded by: María Jesús Montero

Minister of Education, Universities and Research of the Basque Government
- In office 9 May 2009 – 14 December 2012
- President: Patxi López
- Preceded by: José Antonio Campos Granados
- Succeeded by: Cristina Uriarte

Member of the Basque Parliament
- In office 20 November 2012 – 2 August 2016
- In office 25 November 1998 – 12 May 2009
- Constituency: Biscay

Personal details
- Born: 23 May 1949 (age 77) Bilbao, Biscay, Spain
- Party: Socialist Party of the Basque Country–Basque Country Left
- Education: University of Deusto; University of Valladolid

María Isabel Celaá Diéguez (born 23 May 1949) is a Spanish politician. In June 2018, she was appointed Minister of Education and Vocational Training and Spokesperson of the Government of Spain. Since 2022, she serves as Ambassador to the Holy See.

== Biography ==
=== Politics in the Basque Country ===
She started in politics in 1987 as head of the cabinet of the Regional minister of Education, Universities and Research José Ramón Recalde. After the brief interregnum of the coalition government PNV-EA-EE of 1991, she was vice-minister of Education, Universities and Research with Fernando Buesa as Basque counselor until the end of the legislature (1995). In the following legislature she abandoned the educational responsibilities, being director of the cabinet of the Counselor of Justice, Economy, Labor and Social Security, Ramón Jáuregui. Between 1998 and 2009 and 2012 and 2016, she has been a member of the Basque Parliament for Province of Vizcaya. As a parliamentarian, she was responsible for the educational issues of her group. Between 2008 and 2009 she was the first vice president of the Basque Parliament. From 2009 to 2012 she held the position of Counselor of Education, Universities and Research in the government of Patxi López, (Note: Celaá, who does not have Basque surnames, was abused in May 2010 at the Bermeo School Festival, being met with cries of "dirty foreigner go home" (Maketa gogoan zaitez etxera) (Castells, 2014; cfr. Molina & Quiroga 2019, p. 107)) She is particularly interested in the improvement of the Basque educational system and technology, and advocates scientific research.

She was head of list of the PSE-EE to the Senate by the circumscription of Vizcaya in the general elections of 2015 and 2016 but she was not elected.

She is a member of the executive committee of the Socialist Party of the Basque Country–Basque Country Left (PSOE) party.

=== Minister of Education and Vocational Training ===
On 7 June 2018, Pedro Sánchez after being sworn new Spanish Prime Minister, following the motion of censure that the PSOE presented against the previous government of Mariano Rajoy (PP) and that was approved by the Congress of Deputies on 1 June 2018, appointed her as Minister in new Spanish government. Felipe VI sanctioned by royal decree of June her appointment as holder of the portfolio of Minister of Education and Vocational Training and Spokesperson of the Government On 7 June she took office as Minister and Spokeswoman before the King at Palace of Zarzuela.

Appointed as Spanish Ambassador to the Holy See, she presented her diplomatic credentials to Pontiff Francis on 18 March 2022.

In her role as Ambassador to the Holy See, was awarded the Knight Grand Cross of the Order of Pope Pius IX in March 2025 along with the ambassadors of Japan, Austria, France, and other countries on this occasion. The order was presented by Archbishop Edgar Peña Parra.

== Bibliography ==
- Molina, Fernando; Quiroga, Alejandro (2019). "Mixed feelings: Identities and nationalisations in Catalonia and the Basque country (1980–2015)". National Identities. 21. Taylor & Francis: 93–111. doi:10.1080/14608944.2017.1369020. ISSN 1460-8944. S2CID 148923059.

Political offices
Preceded by José Antonio Campos Granados	Regional Minister of Education, Universities and Research of the Basque Government; 2009–2012	Succeeded by Cristina Uriarte
Preceded by Íñigo Méndez de Vigo; Education, Culture and Sports	Minister of Education and Vocational Training; 2018–2021	Succeeded by Pilar Alegría
Preceded by Íñigo Méndez de Vigo	Spokesperson of the Spanish Government; 2018–2020	Succeeded by María Jesús Montero
Diplomatic posts
Preceded by María del Carmen de la Peña Corcuera	Ambassador to the Holy See; 2022–present	Incumbent
