= Education for Citizenship (Spain) =

School subject in Spain

Education for Citizenship and Human Rights (Spanish: Educación para la Ciudadanía y los Derechos Humanos, abbr. EpC) is the name of a school subject designed for the last cycle of primary education and all secondary education in Spain, introduced by the government of José Luis Rodríguez Zapatero. This subject was born upon a recommendation of the Council of Europe that states the necessity of education for citizenship, in order to promote civic and human values. Conservative elements in Spain have opposed this subject especially the Catholic Church.

Several sectors as the conservative People's Party (Spain) and progressive Movements of Pedagogical Renovation have opposed the introduction of this subject. Although outstanding leaders of the Catholic Church have been against it, labelling it as totalitarian, other sectors such as CEAPA (Spanish Confederation of Student's Parents) do not disapprove of EpC, understanding that the curriculum proposed by the government does not overflow the mere education of the most elementary human rights. In some chartered Catholic schools, there are parents who have asked for the conscientious objection before the new subject. This group received high publicity, especially by the Spanish, but as of September 2007 only 80 students have been asked for conscientious objection. As of January 2009, the Spanish Supreme Court has ruled that attendance of the Education for Citizenship course will be mandatory for all students.
