= Rafael Andrade Navarrete =

Spanish politician and lawyer

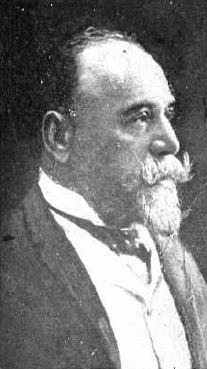
Rafael Andrade Navarrete

Rafael Andrade Navarrete (February 25, 1856, Ardales – June 21, 1928) was a Spanish politician and lawyer.

He was Minister of Public instruction and Fine Arts during the reign of Alfonso XIII. As a member of the Conservative Party, he began his political career as a deputy for Teruel (province) in the elections of 1896, which he would retain in successive elections until 1920. In 1921 he was named as a senator. He was minister of Public Instruction between 25 October and 9 December 1915 and between 11 June and 3 November 1917 in individual governments presided over by Eduardo Dato. For some time he was also President of the Council of State of Spain.
