= First government of Javier Lambán =

1st government of Javier Lambán
- Government of Aragon
- 2015–2019
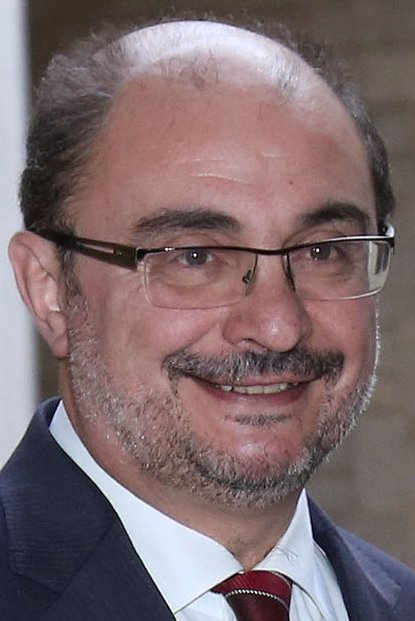
- Javier Lambán in February 2016.
- Date formed: 6 July 2015
- Date dissolved: 6 August 2019

People and organisations
- Monarch: Felipe VI
- President: Javier Lambán
- No. of ministers: 9 (Note: Does not include the President.)
- Total no. of members: 10
- Member party: PSOE; CHA
- Status in legislature: Minority coalition government
- Opposition party: PP
- Opposition leader: Roberto Bermúdez (2015–2016); Mar Vaquero (2016–2017); Luis María Beamonte (2017–2019)

History
- Election: 2015 regional election
- Outgoing election: 2019 regional election
- Legislature term: 9th Cortes
- Predecessor: Rudi
- Successor: Lambán II

The first government of Javier Lambán was formed on 6 July 2015, following the latter's election as President of the Government of Aragon by the Cortes of Aragon on 3 July and his swearing-in on 5 July, as a result of the Spanish Socialist Workers' Party (PSOE) and the Aragonese Union (CHA) being able to muster a majority of seats in the Cortes with external support from Podemos and United Left (IU) following the 2015 Aragonese regional election. It succeeded the government of Luisa Fernanda Rudi and was the Government of Aragon from 6 July 2015 to 6 August 2019, a total of 1,492 days, or 4 years and 1 month.

The cabinet comprised members of the PSOE and the CHA. It was automatically dismissed on 27 May 2019 as a consequence of the 2019 regional election, but remained in acting capacity until the next government was sworn in.

== Investiture ==
Investiture; Javier Lambán (PSOE)
Ballot →	3 July 2015
Required majority →	34 out of 67
Yes: • PSOE (18); • Podemos (14); • CHA (2); • IU (1)	35 / 67
No: • PP (21); • PAR (6); • Cs (5)	32 / 67
Abstentions	0 / 67
Absentees	0 / 67

== Council of Government ==
The Government of Aragon was structured into the office for the president and nine ministries.

← Lambán I Government → (20 August 2019 – 21 June 2021)
Portfolio	Name	Party	Took office	Left office	Ref.
President	Javier Lambán	PSOE	4 July 2015	3 August 2019	
Minister of the Presidency	Vicente Guillén	PSOE	6 July 2015	6 August 2019	
Minister of Economy, Industry and Employment	Marta Gastón	PSOE	6 July 2015	6 August 2019	
Minister of Finance and Public Administration	Fernando Gimeno	PSOE	6 July 2015	6 August 2019	
Minister of Education, Culture and Sports	Mayte Pérez Esteban	PSOE	6 July 2015	6 August 2019	
Minister of Territory Structuring, Mobility and Housing	José Luis Soro	CHA	6 July 2015	6 August 2019	
Minister of Citizenship and Social Rights	María Victoria Broto	PSOE	6 July 2015	6 August 2019	
Minister of Rural Development and Sustainability	Joaquín Olona	PSOE	6 July 2015	6 August 2019	
Minister of Innovation, Research and University	Pilar Alegría	PSOE	6 July 2015	15 June 2019	
Minister of Health	Sebastián Celaya	PSOE	6 July 2015	18 July 2018	
=== Changes July 2018 ===
Portfolio	Name	Party	Took office	Left office	Ref.
Minister of Health	Pilar Ventura	PSOE	18 July 2018	6 August 2019	
=== Changes June 2019 ===
Portfolio	Name	Party	Took office	Left office	Ref.
Minister of Innovation, Research and University	Vicente Guillén served as surrogate from 15 June to 6 August 2019.				

== Notes ==
Preceded by Rudi	Government of Aragon; 2015–2019	Succeeded by Lambán II
