= Second government of Javier Lambán =

2nd government of Javier Lambán
- Government of Aragon
- 2019–2023
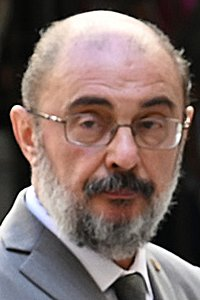
- Javier Lambán in September 2021.
- Date formed: 7 August 2019
- Date dissolved: 12 August 2023

People and organisations
- Monarch: Felipe VI
- President: Javier Lambán
- Vice President: Arturo Aliaga
- No. of ministers: 10 (Note: Does not include the President.)
- Total no. of members: 11
- Member party: PSOE; Podemos; CHA; PAR
- Status in legislature: Majority coalition government
- Opposition party: PP
- Opposition leader: Luis María Beamonte (2019–2021); Jorge Azcón (2021–2023)

History
- Election: 2019 regional election
- Outgoing election: 2023 regional election
- Legislature term: 10th Cortes
- Budget: 2020, 2021, 2022, 2023
- Predecessor: Lambán I
- Successor: Azcón

The second government of Javier Lambán was formed on 7 August 2019, following the latter's election as President of the Government of Aragon by the Cortes of Aragon on 31 July and his swearing-in on 3 August, as a result of the Spanish Socialist Workers' Party (PSOE) emerging as the largest parliamentary force at the 2019 regional election. It succeeded the first Lambán government and was the Government of Aragon from 7 August 2019 to 12 August 2023, a total of 1,466 days, or 4 years and 5 days.

The cabinet comprised members of the PSOE, Podemos, Aragonese Union (CHA) and Aragonese Party (PAR). It was automatically dismissed on 29 May 2023 as a consequence of the 2023 regional election, but remained in acting capacity until the next government was sworn in.

== Investiture ==
Investiture; Javier Lambán (PSOE)
Ballot →	31 July 2019
Required majority →	34 out of 67
Yes: • PSOE (24); • Podemos (5); • CHA (3); • PAR (3); • IU (1)	36 / 67
No: • PP (16); • Cs (12); • Vox (3)	31 / 67
Abstentions	0 / 67
Absentees	0 / 67

== Cabinet changes ==
Lambán's second government saw a number of cabinet changes during its tenure:

- On 12 May 2020, Health minister Pilar Ventura announced her resignation, effective the next day, as a result of fiery protests of health personnel, unions and associations throughout the region following some controversial statements in which she claimed that making protection material with garbage bags amidst the COVID-19 pandemic "stimulated" sanitarians. She was replaced in her post by Sira Repollés on 15 May.

== Council of Government ==
The Council of Government was structured into the offices for the president, the vice president, nine ministries and the post of spokesperson of the Government.

← Lambán II Government → (7 August 2019 – 12 August 2023)
Portfolio	Name	Party	Took office	Left office	Ref.
President	Javier Lambán	PSOE	3 August 2019	11 August 2023	
Vice President; Minister of Industry, Competitiveness and Business Development	Arturo Aliaga	PAR	7 August 2019	12 August 2023	
Minister of the Presidency and Institutional Relations; Spokesperson of the Government	Mayte Pérez	PSOE	7 August 2019	12 August 2023	
Minister of Science, University and Knowledge Society	Maru Díaz	Podemos	7 August 2019	12 August 2023	
Minister of Territory Structuring, Mobility and Housing	José Luis Soro	CHA	7 August 2019	12 August 2023	
Minister of Economy, Planning and Employment	Marta Gastón	PSOE	7 August 2019	12 August 2023	
Minister of Finance and Public Administration	Carlos Pérez Anadón	PSOE	7 August 2019	12 August 2023	
Minister of Education, Culture and Sports	Felipe Faci	PSOE	7 August 2019	12 August 2023	
Minister of Citizenship and Social Rights	María Victoria Broto	PSOE	7 August 2019	12 August 2023	
Minister of Agriculture, Livestock and Environment	Joaquín Olona	PSOE	7 August 2019	12 August 2023	
Minister of Health	Pilar Ventura	PSOE	7 August 2019	13 May 2020	
=== Changes May 2020 ===
Portfolio	Name	Party	Took office	Left office	Ref.
Minister of Health	Sira Repollés	PSOE	15 May 2020	12 August 2023	

== Notes ==
Preceded by Lambán I	Government of Aragon; 2019–2023	Succeeded by Azcón
