= Santiago Morón =

Spanish politician

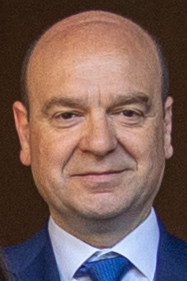

Santiago Morón Sanjuán (born 1968) is a Spanish politician of the party Vox. He was elected to the Cortes of Aragon as his party's lead candidate in 2019.

== Biography ==
Born in Zaragoza in Aragon, Morón is married and has three children as of 2023. He qualified in medicine and surgery from the University of Zaragoza, where he later specialised in family medicine.

Morón joined Vox in its foundation year of 2014, saying "tired of political correctness, of the loss of values and convinced that politics is a necessary tool to transform our society, I decided to take the step". He was the party's lead candidate in the 2019 Aragonese regional election, Running for the first time, his party won three seats and could form a group in the parliament; the balance of the legislature however tilted to the left and Javier Lambán formed a second Spanish Socialist Workers' Party (PSOE)-led government.

In the 2023 Aragonese regional election, Morón again led the Vox list in the Zaragoza constituency, while the lead candidate for the entire region was Alejandro Nolasco. Vox came third both in the constituency and the wider election, and eventually formed a coalition government with the People's Party (PP), led by Jorge Azcón. In September, he and his PP counterpart Fernando Ledesma led the first joint initiative, an investigation into irregularities in the development of renewable energy in the region.

A snap election was held in February 2026, in which Vox remained the third-largest party, but grew from seven to 14 seats. Morón was again his party's lead candidate in Zaragoza.
