= Maru Díaz =

Spanish politician (born 1990)

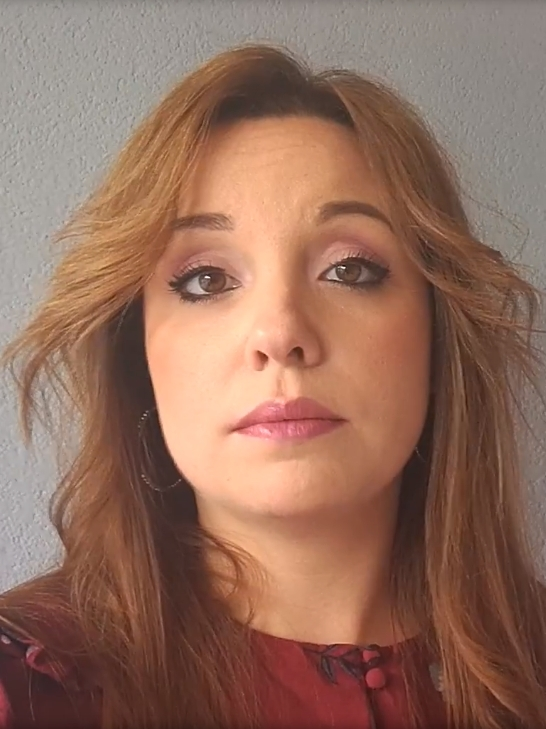
Díaz in 2017

María Eugenia "Maru" Díaz Calvo (born 30 April 1990) is a Spanish former politician for the party Podemos. First elected to the Cortes of Aragon in 2015, she led the party in the 2019 election, and was subsequently made Minister of Science, University and Knowledge Society in the Second government of Javier Lambán. In 2023, after winning the only seat for her party, she left politics.

== Biography ==
Born in Tarazona, Province of Zaragoza, Díaz studied Philosophy at the University of Zaragoza. Elected to the Cortes of Aragon in 2015, she became Podemos's spokesperson in the legislature.

In November 2018, Díaz ran to be Podemos's lead candidate for the 2019 Aragonese regional election. She defeated Erika Sanz in a tight primary decided by just 72 votes (51.4% to 48.6%). She was the youngest and only female lead candidate in the election. She ran on a platform of action against violence towards women, fighting climate change and reversing depopulation of rural areas through improving infrastructure. In the election, Podemos fell from 14 seats to five.

In August 2019, incumbent regional president Javier Lambán (PSOE) formed a four-party government with Podemos, the Aragonese Party and Chunta Aragonesista. Díaz was made Minister of Science, University and Knowledge Society; she said she would increase pay for university staff and bring high-speed internet to rural areas. Days after assuming office, she dismissed Bruno Pérez, one of her department's director generals, for supporting the Catalan independence movement; he had led a project to recreate the Estelada flag in coloured lights.

In the 2023 Aragonese regional election, Podemos lost four seats, leaving only Díaz in the Cortes. She then announced that she would leave both her seat and the regional leadership of the party after the national election in July.
