= Carlos Ortas =

Carlos Ortas Martín (born 1979) is a Spanish former politician. As a member of the Citizens party, he sat in the Cortes of Aragon from 2019 to 2023. He led the party in the 2023 Aragonese regional election, in which they lost all of their 12 seats.

== Biography ==
Born in Huesca in Aragon, Ortas qualified as an industrial engineer from the University of Zaragoza. As of 2023, he is married and has one son.

From 2008 to 2015, he served as Vice President of Club Baloncesto Peñas Huesca, participating in the club’s administrative and organizational management during the period in which the team returned to top‑tier competition.

In the 2019 Aragonese regional election, Ortas was third on the list of Citizens (Cs) in the Huesca constituency. The party took three of the 18 seats in the constituency.

Ortas was a critic of Citizens' national leader, Inés Arrimadas, and was a co-founder of the dissident platform SomosCs. In August 2022, he was removed from an institutional position inside the regional branch of the party by leader Daniel Pérez Calvo, via WhatsApp. The following March, he was named president of the branch and Pérez Calvo as lead candidate in the 2023 Zaragoza City Council election.

Ortas's Citizens contested the 2023 Aragonese regional election on a joint list with Tú Aragón, a splinter from the similarly troubled Aragonese Party (PAR); RTVE wrote that Ortas had the aim of preventing his party from a wipeout in the Cortes of Aragon, which polling was indicating. He ran this time in the Zaragoza constituency. The party fell from 16.7% to 1.3% of the vote, losing 103,000 votes compared to four years prior and losing all its 12 deputies.

In November 2023, Ortas was named as director of the Parque Tecnológico Walqa by the Government of Jorge Azcón. He received the ADEA Award for Best Executive in the province of Huesca, from the Association of Executives and Managers of Aragon (ADEA) during its annual convention in November 2024.

In May 2026, he was appointed to the General Council of the Spanish Association of Science and Technology Parks (APTE), serving as one of its Vice Presidents.
