= Susana Gaspar (politician) =

Spanish politician

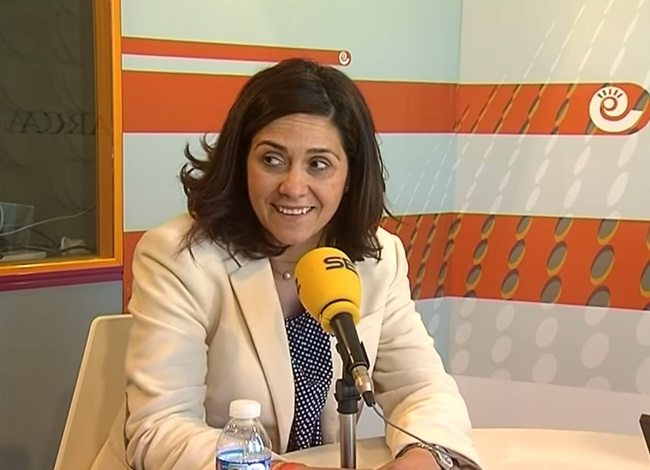

Susana Gaspar Martínez (born 9 August 1974) is a Spanish politician. She was first elected to the Cortes of Aragon as the leader of the Citizens (Cs) list in 2015, moving to the People's Party (PP) in 2023.

== Biography ==
Born in Zaragoza in Aragon, Gaspar graduated with a law degree, and a master's degree in management and human resources. She worked for companies in the Netherlands, Italy and France.

Gaspar joined Citizens (Cs) in 2013 and became the party's territorial delegate to Aragon. She was chosen as their lead candidate in the 2015 Aragonese regional election by being the only candidate to meet the required limit of endorsements. The party entered the Cortes of Aragon with five seats in its first such election, but the balance of power tilted to the left due to bigger losses for the People's Party (PP).

In January 2019, Gaspar said that for personal reasons, she would not run for the party's candidate in that year's regional election. She ran second on the list in the Zaragoza constituency behind new leader Daniel Pérez Calvo, as the party grew to 12 seats.

Gaspar said in January 2023 that she would quit the party at the end of the legislature before the May regional election and return to the private sector; this came while many leading figures left Citizens for other parties. She was however named 15th on the PP list in the Zaragoza constituency by Jorge Azcón. She was elected as her new party became the largest with 28 seats.
