= Alberto Izquierdo =

Spanish politician (born 1983)

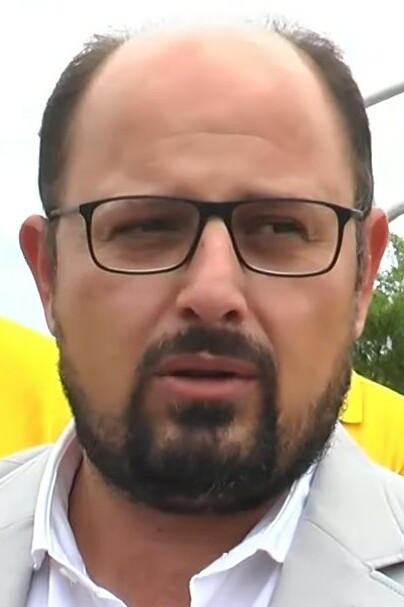

Alberto Izquierdo Vicente (born 1983) is a Spanish politician of the Aragonese Party (PAR). He has served as mayor of Gúdar since 2003, when he was 20. After holding office at comarca and provincial level, he was his party's only member voted to the Cortes of Aragon in 2023, and lost his seat in 2026. He was elected president of his party in 2025.

== Biography ==
=== Early career ===
Born in Gúdar in the Province of Teruel, Izquierdo became his town's mayor in 2003, aged 20. This made him the youngest mayor in Spain.

An agricultural businessman, Izquierdo joined the Aragonese Party (PAR) in 2002. He served as a councillor in his comarca from 2007 to 2011, and its vice president for the next four years. In 2011, he was elected onto the provincial deputation, being his party's spokesperson for the first four years and vice president for the next four.

In October 2021, Arturo Aliaga was re-elected president of the PAR and Izquierdo was named secretary-general. Izquierdo was dismissed as vice president of the provincial deputation in January 2023, on the orders of Aliaga; Izquierdo said that he did not understand the action and that it was similar to dictatorships using firing squads on dissidents. The following month, Aliaga was ousted from office in a vote of no confidence, leading to schisms in the party. The party's new president, Clemente Sánchez-Garnica, restored Izquierdo to office immediately.

=== Cortes of Aragon ===
In March 2023, Izquierdo was named party candidate for the 2023 Aragonese regional election, given that there was no other candidacy. He was the only party member elected to the Cortes of Aragon, a fall from three in the previous election. He said that he was open to collaborate with any other party. In July, Izquierdo was a candidate in the Teruel constituency in the 2023 Spanish general election.

In February 2025, on the order of a local court, the 2021 PAR Congress was nullified due to voter irregularities. Izquierdo was voted the new president with 95% of the only 158 voters.

In the campaign for the snap 2026 Aragonese regional election, Izquierdo accused Vox of being run from Madrid and wanting to send Aragon's water to the Region of Murcia. He also accused Teruel Existe of being a "complete lie" that had supported prime minister Pedro Sánchez's actions allegedly against the interests of Aragon. He lost his seat as PAR took 1.24% of the vote, ending its 43-year presence in the Cortes. The party finished eighth overall, behind Se Acabó La Fiesta, which also won no seats; he congratulated Chunta Aragonesista for their gains.
