= Marta Gastón =

Spanish politician (1973–2026)

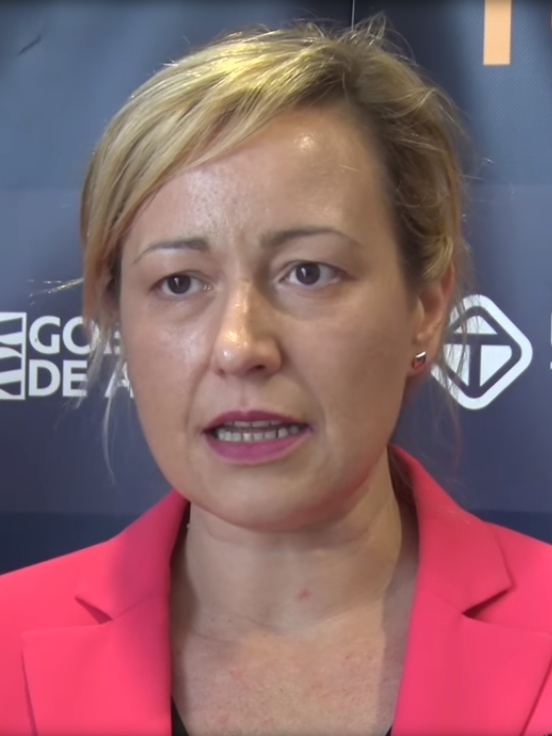
- Gastón in 2018

Member of the Congress of Deputies
- In office 1 April 2008 – 13 February 2011
- Constituency: Huesca

Senator
- In office 2 April 2004 – 31 May 2008
- Constituency: Huesca

Personal details
- Born: 2 February 1973 Huesca, Spain
- Died: 3 November 2026 (aged 53)
- Party: Spanish Socialist Workers' Party (PSOE)
- Education: University of Zaragoza

Marta Gastón Menal (2 February 1973 – 3 November 2026) was a Spanish politician. A member of the Spanish Socialist Workers' Party (PSOE), she was a senator from 2004 to 2008 and a member of the Congress of Deputies from 2008 to 2011. From 2015 to 2023, she was minister of economy and employment in the Government of Aragon.

== Life and career ==
Born in Huesca on 2 February 1973, Gastón graduated in economics from the University of Zaragoza and worked as a corporate account manager for Ibercaja Banco. In the 2004 general election, she was elected to the Senate of Spain by the Huesca constituency. She was deputy spokesperson for the Socialist Parliamentary group and vice spokesperson for the Economy and Finance Committee.

In the 2008 general election, Gastón was elected to the Congress of Deputies on the PSOE list for the Huesca constituency. She was the party spokesperson on the same committee as her last term, in a period marked by the Spanish financial crisis. Concurrently, she was elected to her hometown's municipal council in the 2007 local election, and was put in charge of finance.

Gastón served as minister of economy and employment of Aragon between 2015 and 2023 under Javier Lambán. In August 2016, her department decreed the opening of wind farms after five years of legal dispute; in addition to investment in renewable energy, BonÀrea, Amazon Web Services and Inditex invested in the region during her mandate.

In the 2019 Aragonese regional election, Gastón was second on the PSOE list in the Zaragoza constituency and was elected to the Cortes of Aragon. Lamban set up his second government with partnership from Podemos, the Chunta Aragonesista and the Aragonese Party (PAR); she was named in the same office as his first government, and the portfolio of industry was transferred from her to the PAR. She oversaw the expansion and fusion of the ski resorts of Cerler and Castanesa ski resorts, a proposal that faced opposition within the regional government, as well as the economic recovery after the COVID-19 pandemic.

After being diagnosed with cancer, Gastón did not run for re-election in the 2026 Aragonese election. She died of her illness on 3 November 2026, at the age of 53.
