= Álvaro Sanz (politician) =

Spanish politician

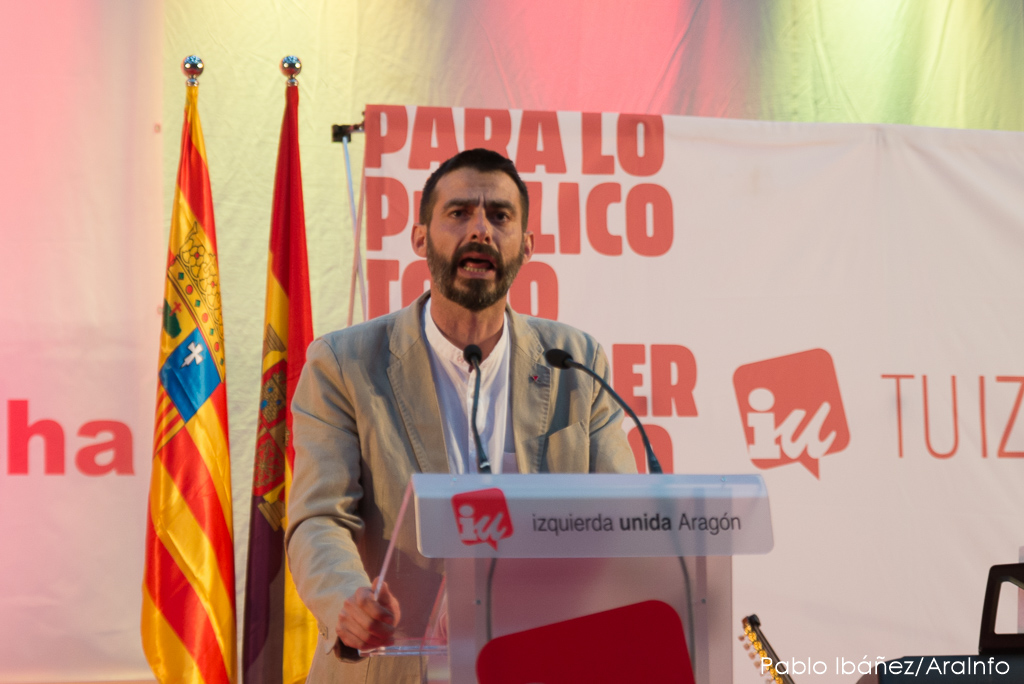

Álvaro Sanz Remón (born 29 August 1977) is a Spanish politician of the United Left (IU). He was a member of the Congress of Deputies (2014–2015) and was elected to the Cortes of Aragon in 2019. He was coordinator of the United Left of Aragon from 2017 to 2025.

== Biography ==
Sanz was born in Ejea de los Caballeros in the Province of Zaragoza. He became active in youth politics aged 13, and continued his anti-militarist activism at 19 when he moved to Zaragoza to study. He worked for a year at Unión de Agricultores y Ganaderos de Aragón (UAGA), a workers' cooperative.

Sanz worked for the United Left (IU) in various roles at local and comarcal level. In July 2014, due to the Plural Left pact between IU and the Chunta Aragonesista (CHA), Sanz replaced the latter's Chesús Yuste in the Congress of Deputies. The pact ran in 2015 as the Popular Unity and lost its seat.

In March 2017, Sanz was elected coordinator of the United Left of Aragon with 55% of the vote against a competing candidacy from Jorge Sanz, replacing Adolfo Barrena after 15 years. His party contested the 2019 Aragonese regional election separately to Podemos, who could not agree on a joint list. He retained their one seat in the Cortes of Aragon. He voted in favour of Javier Lambán remaining President of the Government of Aragon; Lamban's Spanish Socialist Workers' Party (PSOE) formed a four-party government with Podemos, CHA and the Aragonese Party (PAR), with Sanz not joining in as he felt that the PSOE would not lean sufficiently to the left and needed checks in order to not drift to the right.

Sanz was re-elected to his party position unopposed in 2021. He retained his seat with a lower vote in the 2023 Aragonese regional election. On 18 October 2025, he announced that he would not contest re-election as leader of the United Left of Aragon at their assembly the following month.
