= 2023 Aragonese regional election =

Election in the Spanish region of Aragon

- 28 May 2023

All 67 seats in the Cortes of Aragon 34 seats needed for a majority
- Opinion polls
- Registered: 1,019,050 ▲0.1%
- Turnout: 678,112 (66.5%) ▲0.3 pp
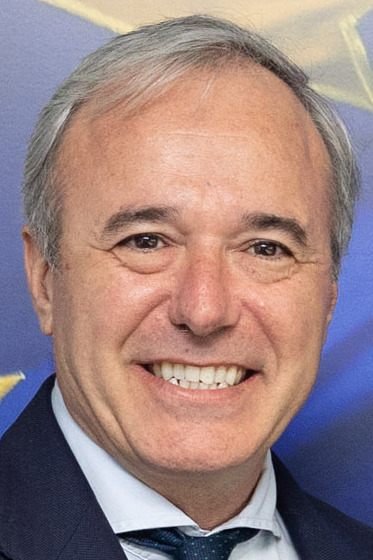

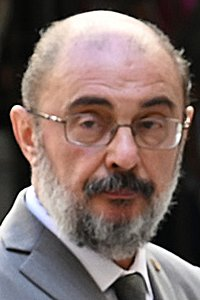

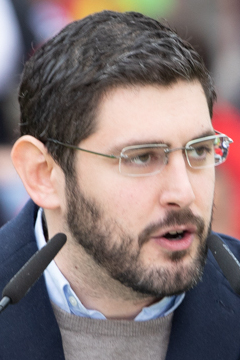

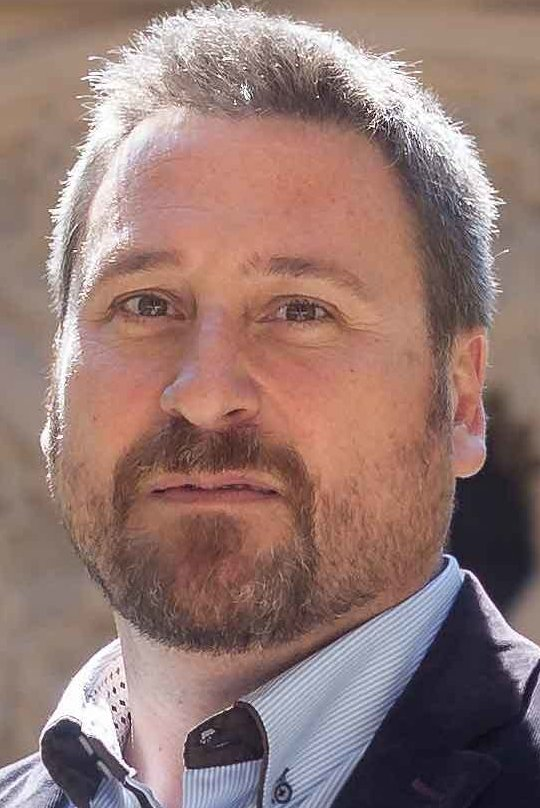

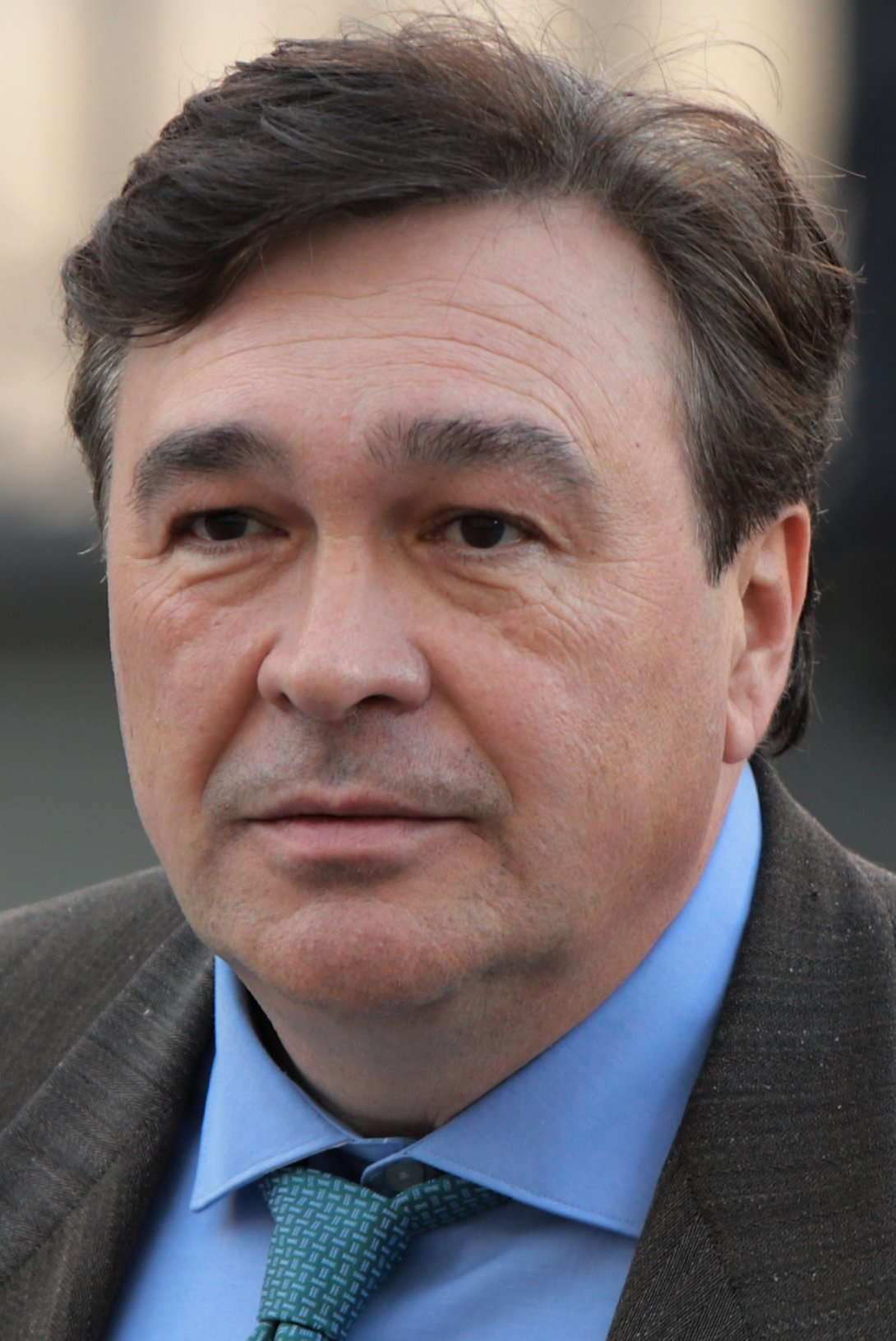

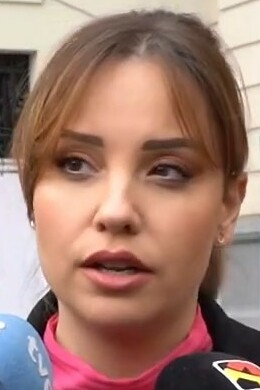

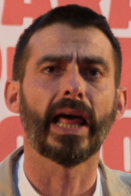

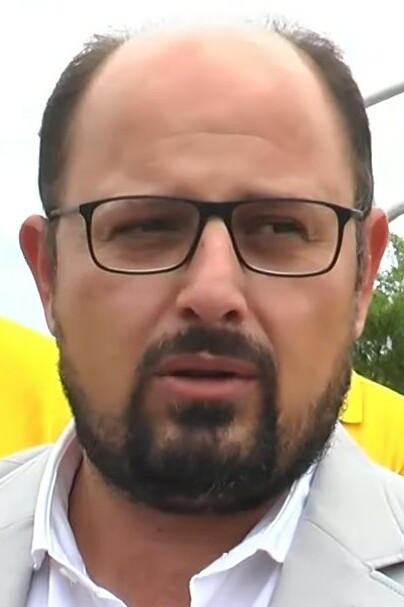

	First party	Second party	Third party
Leader	Jorge Azcón	Javier Lambán	Alejandro Nolasco
Party	PP	PSOE	Vox
Leader since	19 December 2021	31 March 2012	23 December 2022
Leader's seat	Zaragoza	Zaragoza	Teruel
Last election	16 seats, 20.9%	24 seats, 30.8%	3 seats, 6.1%
Seats won	28	23	7
Seat change	▲12	▼1	▲4
Popular vote	237,817	197,919	75,349
Percentage	35.5%	29.6%	11.2%
Swing	▲14.6 pp	▼1.2 pp	▲5.1 pp
	Fourth party	Fifth party	Sixth party
Leader	José Luis Soro	Tomás Guitarte	Maru Díaz
Party	CHA	Existe	Podemos–AV
Leader since	11 February 2012	28 January 2023	27 November 2018
Leader's seat	Zaragoza	Teruel	Zaragoza
Last election	3 seats, 6.3%	Did not contest	5 seats, 8.1%
Seats won	3	3	1
Seat change	0	▲3	▼4
Popular vote	34,163	33,190	26,923
Percentage	5.1%	5.0%	4.0%
Swing	▼1.2 pp	New party	▼4.1 pp
	Seventh party	Eighth party	Ninth party
Leader	Álvaro Sanz	Alberto Izquierdo	Carlos Ortas
Party	IU	PAR	CS–Tú Aragón
Leader since	25 March 2017	8 March 2023	22 March 2023
Leader's seat	Zaragoza	Teruel	Zaragoza (lost)
Last election	1 seat, 3.3%	3 seats, 5.1%	12 seats, 16.7%
Seats won	1	1	0
Seat change	0	▼2	▼12
Popular vote	20,959	13,988	8,595
Percentage	3.1%	2.1%	1.3%
Swing	▼0.2 pp	▼3.0 pp	▼15.4 pp
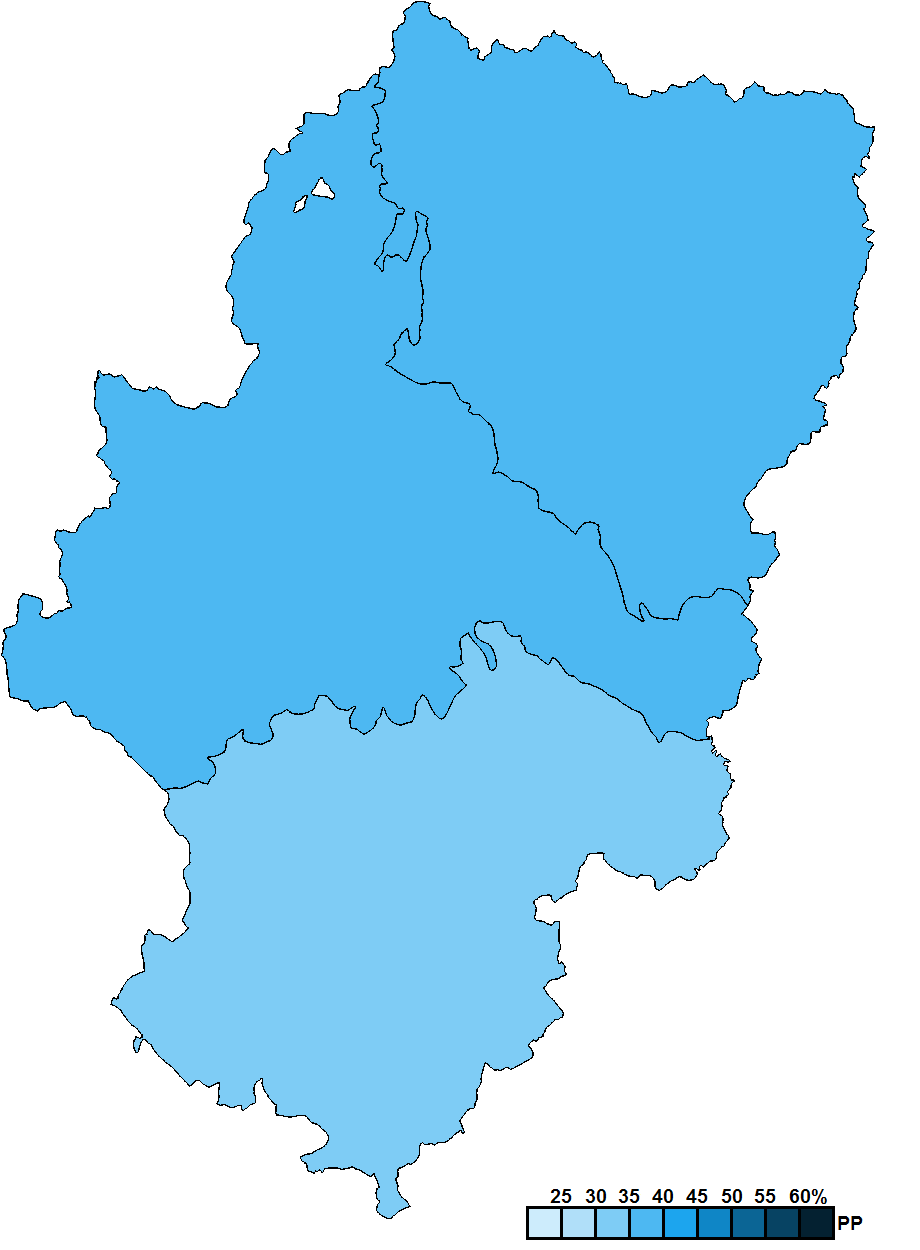
- Constituency results map for the Cortes of Aragon
President before election
Javier Lambán
PSOE
President after election
Jorge Azcón
PP

A regional election was held in Aragon on 28 May 2023 to elect the 11th Cortes of the autonomous community. All 67 seats in the Cortes were up for election. It was held concurrently with regional elections in eleven other autonomous communities and local elections all across Spain.

The election saw a victory for the People's Party (PP) which benefitted from the collapse of Citizens (CS). Together with the far-right Vox, the PP was able to command a majority of seats in the Cortes. The previous government, formed by the Spanish Socialist Workers' Party (PSOE), Podemos, Aragonese Union (CHA) and the Aragonese Party (PAR) under two-term Aragonese president Javier Lambán, fell five seats short of a majority even with the support of United Left (IU). As a result, PP leader Jorge Azcón was able to become new regional president through a coalition with Vox. This coalition government would last until July 2024, when Vox leader Santiago Abascal forced the break up of all PP–Vox governments at the regional level over a national controversy regarding the distribution of unaccompanied migrant minors among the autonomous communities, after which the PP was left in minority.

== Overview ==
Under the 2007 Statute of Autonomy, the Cortes of Aragon was the unicameral legislature of the homonymous autonomous community, having legislative power in devolved matters, as well as the ability to grant or withdraw confidence from a regional president. The electoral and procedural rules were supplemented by national law provisions.

=== Date ===
The term of the Cortes of Aragon expired four years after the date of its previous election, unless it was dissolved earlier. The election decree was required to be issued no later than 25 days before the scheduled expiration date of parliament and published on the following day in the Official Gazette of Aragon (BOA), with election day taking place 54 days after the decree's publication. The previous election was held on 26 May 2019, which meant that the chamber's term would have expired on 26 May 2023. The election decree was required to be published in the BOA no later than 2 May 2023, setting the latest possible date for election day on 25 June 2023.

The regional president had the prerogative to dissolve the Cortes of Aragon at any given time and call a snap election, provided that no motion of no confidence was in process and that dissolution did not occur before one year after a previous one. In the event of an investiture process failing to elect a regional president within a two-month period from the Cortes's reconvening, the chamber was to be automatically dissolved and a fresh election called.

Following speculation in late 2021 on possible snap elections in Andalusia and Castile and León to be held by the spring of 2022, as well as a similar move being considered in the Valencian Community by regional president Ximo Puig, it transpired that President Javier Lambán was evaluating the opportunity of a simultaneous early election in Aragon in order to benefit from an improving economic outlook following the end of the 2020 COVID-19 pandemic-induced economic recession and catch the regional People's Party (PP) leaderless and off-guard. On 11 November, Lambán ruled out such possibility and maintained that the election would be held in May 2023, together with the regularly scheduled local and regional elections.

The Cortes of Aragon was officially dissolved on 4 April 2023 with the publication of the corresponding decree in the BOA, setting election day for 28 May and scheduling for the chamber to reconvene on 23 June.

=== Electoral system ===
Voting for the Cortes was based on universal suffrage, comprising all Spanish nationals over 18 years of age, registered in Aragon and with full political rights, provided that they had not been deprived of the right to vote by a final sentence. Amendments in 2022 abolished the "begged" voting system (Spanish: Voto rogado), under which non-resident citizens were required to apply for voting. The begged vote system was attributed responsibility for a major decrease in the turnout of Spaniards abroad during the years it was in force.

The Cortes of Aragon had a minimum of 65 and a maximum of 80 seats, with electoral provisions fixing its size at 67. All were elected in three multi-member constituencies—corresponding to the provinces of Huesca, Teruel and Zaragoza, each of which was assigned an initial minimum of 14 seats and the remaining 25 distributed in proportion to population (with the seat-to-population ratio in the most populated province not exceeding three times that of the least populated one)—using the D'Hondt method and closed-list proportional voting, with a three percent-threshold of valid votes (including blank ballots) in each constituency. The use of this electoral method resulted in a higher effective threshold depending on district magnitude and vote distribution.

As a result of the aforementioned allocation, each Cortes constituency was entitled the following seats:

Seats	Constituencies
35	Zaragoza
18	Huesca
14	Teruel

The law did not provide for by-elections to fill vacant seats; instead, any vacancies arising after the proclamation of candidates and during the legislative term were filled by the next candidates on the party lists or, when required, by designated substitutes.

=== Outgoing parliament ===
The table below shows the composition of the parliamentary groups in the chamber at the time of dissolution.

Parliamentary composition in April 2023
Groups	Parties	Legislators	
Groups	Parties	Seats	Total
Socialist Parliamentary Group	PSOE	24	24
People's Parliamentary Group in the Cortes of Aragon	PP	16	16
Citizens–Party of the Citizenry Parliamentary Group	CS	12	12
We Can–Equo Parliamentary Group	Podemos	5	5
Aragonese Union Parliamentary Group	CHA	3	3
Vox Parliamentary Group	Vox	3	3
Aragonese Parliamentary Group	PAR	3	3
Mixed Parliamentary Group	IU	1	1

== Parties and candidates ==
The electoral law allowed for parties and federations registered in the interior ministry, alliances and groupings of electors to present lists of candidates. Parties and federations intending to form an alliance were required to inform the relevant electoral commission within 10 days of the election call, whereas groupings of electors needed to secure the signature of at least one percent of the electorate in the constituencies for which they sought election, disallowing electors from signing for more than one list. Additionally, a balanced composition of men and women was required in the electoral lists, so that candidates of either sex made up at least 40 percent of the total composition.

Below is a list of the main parties and alliances which contested the election:

Candidacy	Parties and alliances	Leading candidate	Ideology	Previous result		Gov.	Ref.
Candidacy	Parties and alliances	Leading candidate	Ideology	Vote %	Seats	Gov.	Ref.
PSOE	List: Spanish Socialist Workers' Party (PSOE)	Javier Lambán	Social democracy	30.8%	24	Yes	
PP	List: People's Party (PP); Aragonese People–Aragonese Platform (Aragoneses)	Jorge Azcón	Conservatism; Christian democracy	20.9%	16	No	
CS– Tú Aragón	List: Citizens–Party of the Citizenry (CS); You Aragon (Tú Aragón)	Carlos Ortas	Liberalism	16.7%	12	No	
Podemos–AV	List: We Can (Podemos); Green Alliance (AV)	Maru Díaz	Left-wing populism Direct democracy Democratic socialism	8.1%	5	Yes	
CHA	List: Aragonese Union (CHA)	José Luis Soro	Aragonese nationalism Eco-socialism	6.3%	3	Yes	
Vox	List: Vox (Vox)	Alejandro Nolasco	Right-wing populism Ultranationalism; National conservatism	6.1%	3	No	
PAR	List: Aragonese Party (PAR); Aragonese Liberal Platform (PLA)	Alberto Izquierdo	Regionalism; Centrism	5.1%	3	Yes	
IU	List: United Left of Aragon (IU) – Communist Party of Aragon (PCE–A) – The Dawn Marxist Organization (La Aurora (OM)) – Republican Left (IR)	Álvaro Sanz	Socialism; Communism	3.3%	1	No	
Existe	List: Teruel Exists (TE); Aragon Exists (AE); Empty Spain (EV)	Tomás Guitarte	Localism; Ruralism	Did not contest		No	

In September 2021, citizen collectives of the so-called "Empty Spain" (Spanish: España Vacía or España Vaciada), a coined term to refer to Spain's rural and largely unpopulated interior provinces, agreed to look forward for formulas to contest the next elections in Spain, inspired by the success of the Teruel Existe candidacy (Spanish for "Teruel Exists") in the November 2019 Spanish general election. By December 2021, the platform was seeking to field candidacies in all three Aragonese provinces ahead of the next regional election.

== Campaign ==
=== Debates ===
2023 Aragonese regional election debates
Date	Organizer(s)	Moderator(s)	P Present (Note: Denotes a main invitee attending the event.) S Surrogate (Note: Denotes a main invitee not attending the event, sending a surrogate in their place.) NI Not invited I Invited A Absent invitee										
Date	Organizer(s)	Moderator(s)	PSOE	PP	CS–TA	Podemos	CHA	Vox	PAR	IU	Existe	Audience	Ref.
15 May	Aragón TV	Ana Laiglesia	P Lambán	P Azcón	P Ortas	P Díaz	P Soro	P Nolasco	P Izquierdo	P Sanz	P Guitarte	10.6% (?)	

== Opinion polls ==
The tables below list opinion polling results in reverse chronological order, showing the most recent first and using the dates when the survey fieldwork was done, as opposed to the date of publication. Where the fieldwork dates are unknown, the date of publication is given instead. The highest percentage figure in each polling survey is displayed with its background shaded in the leading party's colour. If a tie ensues, this is applied to the figures with the highest percentages. The "Lead" column on the right shows the percentage-point difference between the parties with the highest percentages in a poll.

=== Graphical summary ===
Local regression trend line of poll results from 26 May 2019 to 28 May 2023, with each line corresponding to a political party.

=== Voting intention estimates ===
The table below lists weighted voting intention estimates. Refusals are generally excluded from the party vote percentages, while question wording and the treatment of "don't know" responses and those not intending to vote may vary between polling organisations. When available, seat projections determined by the polling organisations are displayed below (or in place of) the percentages in a smaller font; 34 seats were required for an absolute majority in the Cortes of Aragon.

Color key:

Poll conducted after legal ban on opinion polls

Polling firm/Commissioner	Fieldwork date	Sample size	Turnout	PSOE	PP	CS	Podemos	CHA	Vox	PAR	IU	Unidas Podemos	Mas País–CHA–Equo	Existe	ZGZ	Lead
2023 regional election	28 May 2023	—N/a	66.5	29.6; 23	35.5; 28	1.3; 0	4.0; 1	5.1; 3	11.2; 7	2.1; 1	3.1; 1	–	–	5.0; 3	–	5.9
GAD3/RTVE–FORTA	12–27 May 2023	1,100	?	28.1; 22/23	37.1; 28/29	1.3; 0	6.0; 2/3	5.7; 2/3	12.1; 7/9	2.1; 0	2.9; 1	–	–	2.6; 2	–	9.0
A+M/Heraldo de Aragón	25–26 May 2023	1,200	68.2	30.1; 21/23	34.7; 24/27	1.4; 0	6.2; 3	6.1; 3/4	9.0; 5/7	2.6; 1	3.0; 1	–	–	5.1; 4	–	4.6
NC Report/La Razón	22 May 2023	?	?	31.3; 23/24	35.0; 27/28	–	5.3; 2/3	4.9; 2/3	8.9; 6/7	–	3.7; 0/1	–	–	3.9; 2/3	–	3.7
KeyData/Público	19 May 2023	?	67.0	31.1; 25	34.7; 27	2.4; 0	5.6; 3	5.5; 2	9.1; 6	2.1; 0	3.9; 1	–	–	4.2; 3	–	3.6
Data10/Okdiario	15–17 May 2023	1,500	?	30.2; 24	33.8; 27	2.3; 0	5.6; 3	5.4; 3	9.4; 6	2.4; 0	3.7; 1	–	–	4.2; 3	–	3.6
Target Point/El Debate	12–17 May 2023	803	?	29.8; 23/24	34.0; 27	? 0	? 3	? 2/3	9.8; 5/7	? 0	? 1	–	–	4.1; 3	–	4.2
EM-Analytics/El Plural	11–17 May 2023	600	?	29.2; 22	33.6; 26	2.5; 0	6.2; 3	5.6; 3	10.4; 7	2.0; 0	3.6; 1	–	–	3.1; 5	–	4.4
A+M/Heraldo de Aragón	10–17 May 2023	4,800	67.8	29.9; 21/24	34.6; 24/27	1.9; 0	6.0; 3	6.9; 3/4	8.4; 5/6	2.3; 1/2	3.1; 1	–	–	5.7; 5	–	4.7
Sigma Dos/El Mundo	10–17 May 2023	1,243	?	32.7; 23/26	36.4; 26/28	1.3; 0	4.5; 2/5	6.2; 3	9.7; 6/8	1.8; 0	2.5; 1	–	–	3.1; 2/3	–	3.7
SocioMétrica/El Español	8–14 May 2023	?	?	29.8; 23/24	33.9; 27/28	2.9; 0	5.6; 3	4.6; 2/3	9.9; 6/7	2.1; 0	3.9; 1	–	–	4.0; 3	–	4.1
EM-Analytics/El Plural	4–10 May 2023	600	?	29.2; 22	33.2; 26	2.5; 0	6.1; 3	5.6; 2	10.3; 7	2.0; 0	3.6; 1	–	–	3.6; 6	–	4.0
IMOP/El Confidencial	2–3 May 2023	1,048	?	32.6; 25	34.5; 26	1.0; 0	5.0; 3	6.0; 3	9.2; 6	2.4; 0	3.8; 1	–	–	2.6; 3	–	1.9
EM-Analytics/El Plural	26 Apr–3 May 2023	600	?	29.5; 21	33.1; 24	3.1; 1	6.2; 3	5.7; 2	10.3; 7	2.5; 0	3.6; 1	–	–	4.5; 8	–	3.6
CIS	10–26 Apr 2023	1,556	?	31.1; 24/26	36.2; 24/28	1.3; 0	6.4; 3	5.5; 2/4	7.3; 3/5	1.6; 0/1	4.2; 1	–	–	3.4; 4	–	5.1
EM-Analytics/El Plural	19–25 Apr 2023	600	?	29.4; 21	33.3; 24	3.1; 1	6.2; 3	5.7; 2	10.3; 7	2.5; 0	3.6; 1	–	–	4.3; 8	–	3.9
Simple Lógica/elDiario.es	12–20 Apr 2023	854	65.1	28.4; 23	29.9; 23	3.8; 1	5.5; 3	6.4; 3	10.0; 6/7	1.4; 0	5.0; 2	–	–	7.5; 5/6	–	1.5
A+M/Heraldo de Aragón	12–19 Apr 2023	4,800	68.2	33.6; 25/28	38.0; 27/30	2.7; 0/1	5.4; 4	6.3; 3/5	5.2; 3/5	3.5; 0/2	3.3; 1	–	–	0.9; 1/2	–	4.4
EM-Analytics/El Plural	12–18 Apr 2023	600	?	29.7; 21	32.3; 24	3.0; 1	6.5; 3	5.9; 3	10.9; 7	3.0; 1	3.3; 1	–	–	4.0; 6	–	2.6
NC Report/La Razón	7–14 Apr 2023	?	65.7	29.6; 23	34.9; 27	2.3; 0	5.5; 3	4.6; 2	8.8; 7	2.3; 0	4.1; 1	–	–	5.4; 4	–	5.3
EM-Analytics/El Plural	5–11 Apr 2023	600	?	30.2; 20	30.7; 22	3.0; 1	6.7; 3	6.4; 4	10.8; 7	3.8; 2	2.9; 1	–	–	4.2; 7	–	0.5
SocioMétrica/El Español	3–7 Apr 2023	1,200	?	29.0; 22/23	33.5; 26/27	2.6; 0	6.0; 3	4.6; 1/2	9.9; 6	2.4; 0	3.7; 1	–	–	5.2; 6	–	4.5
EM-Analytics/El Plural	27 Mar–4 Apr 2023	600	?	29.9; 20	30.4; 22	3.0; 1	6.8; 3	6.4; 4	11.0; 7	3.9; 2	2.9; 1	–	–	4.4; 7	–	0.5
Sigma Dos/El Mundo	27 Mar–4 Apr 2023	1,315	?	31.2; 23/24	33.4; 25	3.5; 1	5.7; 3/4	5.2; 3	9.3; 5/7	1.8; 0	4.0; 1	–	–	4.6; 4/5	–	2.2
EM-Analytics/Electomanía	14–30 Mar 2023	372	?	30.3; 21	28.9; 21	2.9; 1	6.7; 3	6.4; 4	10.9; 7	4.0; 2	3.0; 1	–	–	4.2; 7	–	1.4
Target Point/El Debate	15–18 Jan 2023	1,001	?	28.7; 20/22	34.0; 24/25	2.2; 0	6.9; 3/4	4.6; 2/3	10.5; 6/8	3.1; 1/2	3.6; 1	–	–	4.6; 4/5	–	5.3
EM-Analytics/Electomanía	15 Nov–29 Dec 2022	362	?	31.9; 23	27.6; 20	2.9; 1	(Note: Within Unidas Podemos.)	6.7; 4	10.6; 6	4.5; 3		9.5; 4	–	4.0; 6	–	4.3
CIS (Note: Vote+Simpathy figures with undecided and/or abstentionists excluded.)	17 Nov–2 Dec 2022	324	?	41.7; 27/40	26.0; 16/22	2.0; 0/2		3.8; 1/2	6.3; 2/7	1.0; 0/2		7.3; 3/8	–	4.7; 2/5	0.2; 0/1	15.7
Sigma Dos/El Mundo	14–17 Nov 2022	1,000	?	28.5; 20/21	29.6; 21/23	1.8; 0	8.0; 5/6	8.1; 4/5	10.9; 7/8	3.3; 2/3	3.8; 1	–	–	4.4; 2/4	–	1.1
SocioMétrica/El Español	3–7 Oct 2022	1,200	?	27.0; 20/21	32.3; 25/26	2.1; 0	5.8; 3/4	5.3; 2	15.3; 10/11	3.3; 0/1	4.4; 1	–	–	3.8; 4	–	5.3
A+M/Heraldo de Aragón	27 Sep–6 Oct 2022	3,600	68.5	31.9; 24	32.0; 24	4.4; 1	6.2; 3	7.0; 5	6.6; 4	3.9; 3	3.2; 1	–	–	2.3; 2	–	0.1
EM-Analytics/Electomanía	14 Aug–28 Sep 2022	204	?	33.0; 23	27.2; 20	3.0; 1		6.7; 4	10.5; 6	4.5; 3		9.0; 4	–	3.9; 6	–	5.8
EM-Analytics/Electomanía	31 Mar–15 May 2022	180	?	32.8; 23	25.9; 17	3.1; 1		6.8; 4	11.5; 7	4.5; 3		8.9; 4	–	4.5; 8	–	6.9
A+M/Heraldo de Aragón	4–18 Apr 2022	3,600	69.8	30.6; 23	32.4; 24	5.1; 3	6.3; 3	6.6; 3	7.0; 5	4.4; 2	3.7; 1	–	–	2.2; 3	–	1.8
EM-Analytics/Electomanía	16 Nov–29 Dec 2021	?	?	33.5; 23	26.5; 18	3.3; 1		7.0; 4	10.3; 7	4.3; 3		8.7; 4	–	4.3; 7	–	7.0
EM-Analytics/Electomanía	30 Jun–13 Aug 2021	251	?	30.9; 22	29.5; 22	3.4; 1		7.3; 4	10.1; 7	4.7; 2		8.3; 5	–	3.0; 4	–	1.4
A+M/Heraldo de Aragón	12–19 Apr 2021	3,600	69.3	32.7; 25	31.2; 23	4.9; 3	5.9; 3	7.2; 5	7.5; 5	4.4; 2	3.8; 1	–	–	–	–	1.5
SyM Consulting	1–3 Mar 2021	1,938	65.7	33.5; 26	23.2; 16/17	5.3; 2/4	6.9; 4	6.6; 4	12.8; 8/9	5.4; 3/5	2.5; 1	–	–	–	–	10.3
ElectoPanel/Electomanía	12 Jul–13 Aug 2020	?	?	30.7; 24	25.5; 20	8.1; 4	8.1; 4	5.1; 2	8.9; 5	3.6; 2	2.9; 1	–	–	3.1; 5	–	5.2
ElectoPanel/Electomanía	12 Jul–13 Aug 2020	?	?	31.9; 25	26.0; 21	8.3; 5	8.3; 5	5.4; 2	9.0; 5	4.3; 3	2.9; 1	–	–	–	–	5.9
SyM Consulting	28–30 May 2020	1,952	68.2	28.8; 22/24	25.4; 19/20	7.2; 4	8.2; 4	5.7; 3/4	14.4; 9/11	4.8; 3	2.0; 0	–	–	–	–	3.4
ElectoPanel/Electomanía	1 Apr–15 May 2020	?	?	33.2; 26	26.5; 21	8.7; 5	8.4; 5	5.4; 2	7.8; 5	4.2; 2	2.9; 1	–	–	–	–	6.7
November 2019 general election	10 Nov 2019	—N/a	69.3	30.7 (23)	23.9 (18)	8.6 (4)		0.3 (0)	17.0 (11)	–		10.8 (6)	3.3 (1)	2.8 (4)	–	6.8
2019 regional election	26 May 2019	—N/a	66.2	30.8; 24	20.9; 16	16.7; 12	8.1; 5	6.3; 3	6.1; 3	5.1; 3	3.3; 1	–	–	–	–	9.9

=== Voting preferences ===
The table below lists raw, unweighted voting preferences.

Polling firm/Commissioner	Fieldwork date	Sample size	PSOE	PP	CS	Podemos	CHA	Vox	PAR	IU	Unidas Podemos	Mas País–CHA–Equo	Existe	Question	X mark	Lead
2023 regional election (Note: Does not include non-resident citizens.)	28 May 2023	—N/a	19.9	23.9	0.9	2.7	3.4	7.6	1.4	2.1	–	–	3.4	—N/a	30.8	4.0
CIS	10–26 Apr 2023	1,556	22.1	25.2	0.7	4.2	3.0	5.4	0.9	2.6	–	–	2.2	26.6	3.4	3.1
CIS	17 Nov–2 Dec 2022	324	28.7	17.0	0.9		2.6	4.8	–		5.0	–	2.6	29.3	4.5	11.7
November 2019 general election	10 Nov 2019	—N/a	21.8	16.9	6.1		0.2	12.1	0.0		7.6	2.3	2.0	—N/a	28.5	4.9
2019 regional election	26 May 2019	—N/a	20.8	14.1	11.3	5.5	4.2	4.1	3.4	2.2	–	–	–	—N/a	31.9	6.7

=== Preferred President ===
The table below lists opinion polling on leader preferences to become president of the Government of Aragon.

Polling firm/Commissioner	Fieldwork date	Sample size													Other/ None/ Not care	Question	Lead
Polling firm/Commissioner	Fieldwork date	Sample size	Lambán PSOE	Azcón PP	Pérez CS	Ortas CS	Díaz Podemos	Soro CHA	Morón Vox	Nolasco Vox	Aliaga PAR	Izquierdo PAR	Sanz IU	Guitarte Existe	Other/ None/ Not care	Question	Lead
IMOP/El Confidencial	2–3 May 2023	1,048	28.7	19.7	–	–	–	–	–	–	–	–	–	–	–	–	9.0
SocioMétrica/El Español	3–7 Apr 2023	1,200	30.2	29.4	–	3.0	6.2	5.5	–	9.6	–	2.9	3.1	10.1	–	–	0.8
A+M/Heraldo de Aragón	14–18 Jan 2023	1,400	33.4	32.3	–	–	–	–	–	–	–	–	–	–	34.3		1.1
SocioMétrica/El Español	3–7 Oct 2022	1,200	24.9	31.7	4.0	–	6.0	6.1	11.3	–	5.7	–	3.5	6.8	–	–	6.8

=== Predicted President ===
The table below lists opinion polling on the perceived likelihood for each leader to become president.

Polling firm/Commissioner	Fieldwork date	Sample size			Other/ None/ Not care	Question	Lead
Polling firm/Commissioner	Fieldwork date	Sample size	Lambán PSOE	Azcón PP	Other/ None/ Not care	Question	Lead
A+M/Heraldo de Aragón	14–18 Jan 2023	1,400	29.8	28.4	41.8		1.4

== Voter turnout ==
The table below shows registered voter turnout during the election. Figures for election day do not include non-resident citizens, while final figures do.

Province	Time (Election day)									Final		
Province	14:00			18:00			20:00			Final		
Province	2019	2023	+/–	2019	2023	+/–	2019	2023	+/–	2019	2023	+/–
Huesca	36.58%	39.61%	+3.03	51.42%	53.45%	+2.03	68.94%	68.80%	−0.14	66.21%	65.66%	−0.55
Teruel	39.02%	42.89%	+3.87	55.36%	59.14%	+3.78	70.11%	74.59%	+4.48	69.67%	70.71%	+1.04
Zaragoza	37.24%	40.99%	+3.75	51.47%	54.41%	+2.94	67.59%	69.64%	+2.05	65.64%	66.15%	+0.51
Total	37.27%	40.96%	+3.69	52.07%	54.73%	+2.66	68.08%	70.01%	+1.93	66.16%	66.54%	+0.38

== Results ==
=== Overall ===
← Summary of the 28 May 2023 Cortes of Aragon election results →
Parties and alliances	Popular vote			Seats	
Parties and alliances	Votes	%	±pp	Total	+/−
People's Party (PP)	237,817	35.51	+14.64	28	+12
Spanish Socialist Workers' Party (PSOE)	197,919	29.55	−1.29	23	−1
Vox (Vox)	75,349	11.25	+5.17	7	+4
Aragonese Union (CHA)	34,163	5.10	−1.16	3	±0
Exists Coalition (Existe)	33,190	4.96	New	3	+3
We Can–Green Alliance (Podemos–AV)	26,923	4.02	−4.09	1	−4
United Left of Aragon (IU)	20,959	3.13	−0.19	1	±0
Aragonese Party (PAR)	13,988	2.09	−2.99	1	−2
Citizens–You Aragon (CS–Tú Aragón)	8,595	1.28	−15.39	0	−12
Animalist Party with the Environment (PACMA)^{1}	3,343	0.50	−0.18	0	±0
Blank Seats to Leave Empty Seats (EB)	2,860	0.43	+0.21	0	±0
Federation of Independents of Aragon (FIA)	1,248	0.19	+0.07	0	±0
Greens Equo (Equo)	1,156	0.17	New	0	±0
Communist Party of the Workers of Spain (PCTE)	878	0.13	+0.05	0	±0
Lower Cinca Between Everyone (ETXSBC)	541	0.08	New	0	±0
Blank ballots	10,846	1.62	+0.64		
Total	669,775			67	±0
Valid votes	669,775	98.77	−0.56		
Invalid votes	8,337	1.23	+0.56		
Votes cast / turnout	678,112	66.54	+0.38		
Abstentions	340,938	33.46	−0.38		
Registered voters	1,019,050				
Sources
Footnotes: ^{1} Animalist Party with the Environment results are compared to Animalist Party Against Mistreatment of Animals totals in the 2019 election.

Popular vote
PP	35.51%
PSOE	29.55%
Vox	11.25%
CHA	5.10%
Existe	4.96%
Podemos–AV	4.02%
IU	3.13%
PAR	2.09%
CS–Tú Aragón	1.28%
Others	1.50%
Blank ballots	1.62%

Seats
PP	41.79%
PSOE	34.33%
Vox	10.45%
CHA	4.48%
Existe	4.48%
Podemos–AV	1.49%
IU	1.49%
PAR	1.49%

=== Distribution by constituency ===
Constituency	PP		PSOE		Vox		CHA		Existe		Podemos		IU		PAR	
Constituency	%	S	%	S	%	S	%	S	%	S	%	S	%	S	%	S
Huesca	35.2	8	30.1	7	10.1	2	5.5	1	3.2	−	3.9	−	2.6	−	3.3	−
Teruel	31.1	5	22.8	4	10.5	1	2.0	−	20.7	3	1.9	−	2.2	−	6.5	1
Zaragoza	36.2	15	30.5	12	11.6	4	5.5	2	3.0	−	4.4	1	3.4	1	1.1	−
Total	35.5	28	29.6	23	11.2	7	5.1	3	5.0	3	4.0	1	3.1	1	2.1	1

== Aftermath ==
=== Government formation ===
Investiture; Nomination of Jorge Azcón (PP)
Ballot →	10 August 2023
Required majority →	34 out of 67
Yes: • PP (28); • Vox (7); • PAR (1)	36 / 67
No: • PSOE (23); • CHA (3); • Existe (3); • Podemos (1); • IU (1)	31 / 67
Abstentions	0 / 67
Absentees	0 / 67

== Bibliography ==
- Ley Orgánica 5/1985, de 19 de junio, del Régimen Electoral General (Organic Law 5/1985). Official State Gazette (in Spanish). 19 June 1985 [version as of 3 October 2022]. BOE-A-1985-11672.
- Ley 2/1987, de 16 de febrero, Electoral de la Comunidad Autónoma de Aragón (Law 2/1987). Official State Gazette (in Spanish). 16 February 1987 [version as of 28 February 2023]. BOE-A-1987-5339.
- Ley Orgánica 5/2007, de 20 de abril, de reforma del Estatuto de Autonomía de Aragón (Organic Law 5/2007). Official State Gazette (in Spanish). 20 April 2007 [version as of 28 December 2022]. BOE-A-2007-8444.
- Decreto Legislativo 1/2022, de 6 de abril, del Gobierno de Aragón, por el que se aprueba el texto refundido de la Ley del Presidente o Presidenta y del Gobierno de Aragón (Legislative Decree 1/2022). Official State Gazette (in Spanish). 6 April 2022 [version as of 20 April 2022]. BOE-A-2022-7004.
- Decreto de 3 de abril de 2023, del Presidente de Aragón, por el que se convocan elecciones a las Cortes de Aragón (Decree). Official Gazette of Aragon (in Spanish). 3 April 2023. BOA20230404001.
