= 2015 Aragonese regional election =

Election in the Spanish region of Aragon

- 24 May 2015

All 67 seats in the Cortes of Aragon 34 seats needed for a majority
- Opinion polls
- Registered: 1,020,106 ▲0.4%
- Turnout: 676,654 (66.3%) ▼1.6 pp
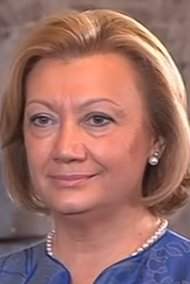

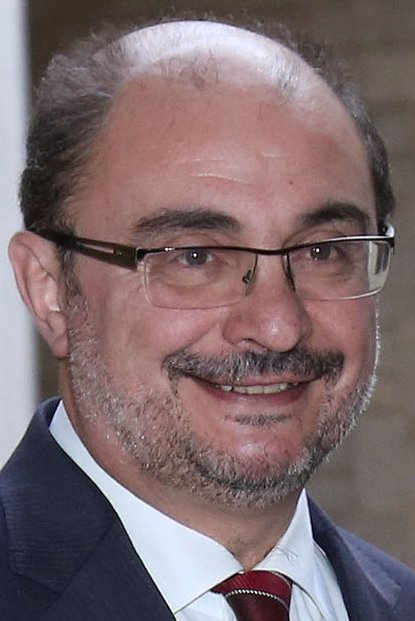

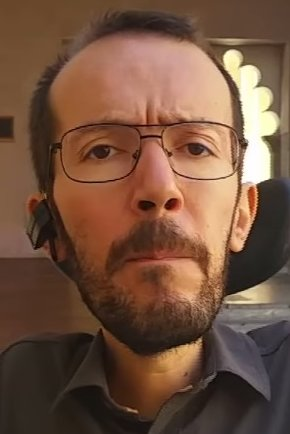

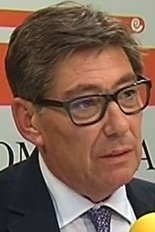

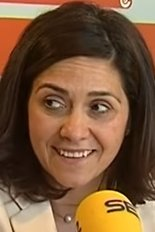

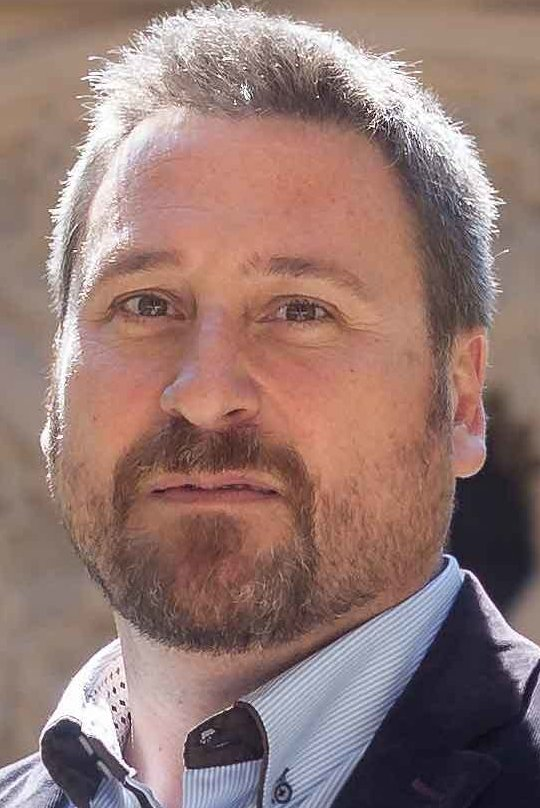
	First party	Second party	Third party
Leader	Luisa Fernanda Rudi	Javier Lambán	Pablo Echenique
Party	PP	PSOE	Podemos
Leader since	8 November 2008	31 March 2012	14 February 2015
Leader's seat	Zaragoza	Zaragoza	Zaragoza
Last election	30 seats, 39.7%	22 seats, 29.0%	Did not contest
Seats won	21	18	14
Seat change	▼9	▼4	▲14
Popular vote	183,654	143,096	137,325
Percentage	27.5%	21.4%	20.6%
Swing	▼12.2 pp	▼7.6 pp	New party
	Fourth party	Fifth party	Sixth party
Leader	Arturo Aliaga	Susana Gaspar	José Luis Soro
Party	PAR	C's	CHA
Leader since	29 November 2014	14 March 2015	11 February 2012
Leader's seat	Zaragoza	Zaragoza	Zaragoza
Last election	7 seats, 9.2%	Did not contest	4 seats, 8.2%
Seats won	6	5	2
Seat change	▼1	▲5	▼2
Popular vote	45,846	62,907	30,618
Percentage	6.9%	9.4%	4.6%
Swing	▼2.3 pp	New party	▼3.6 pp
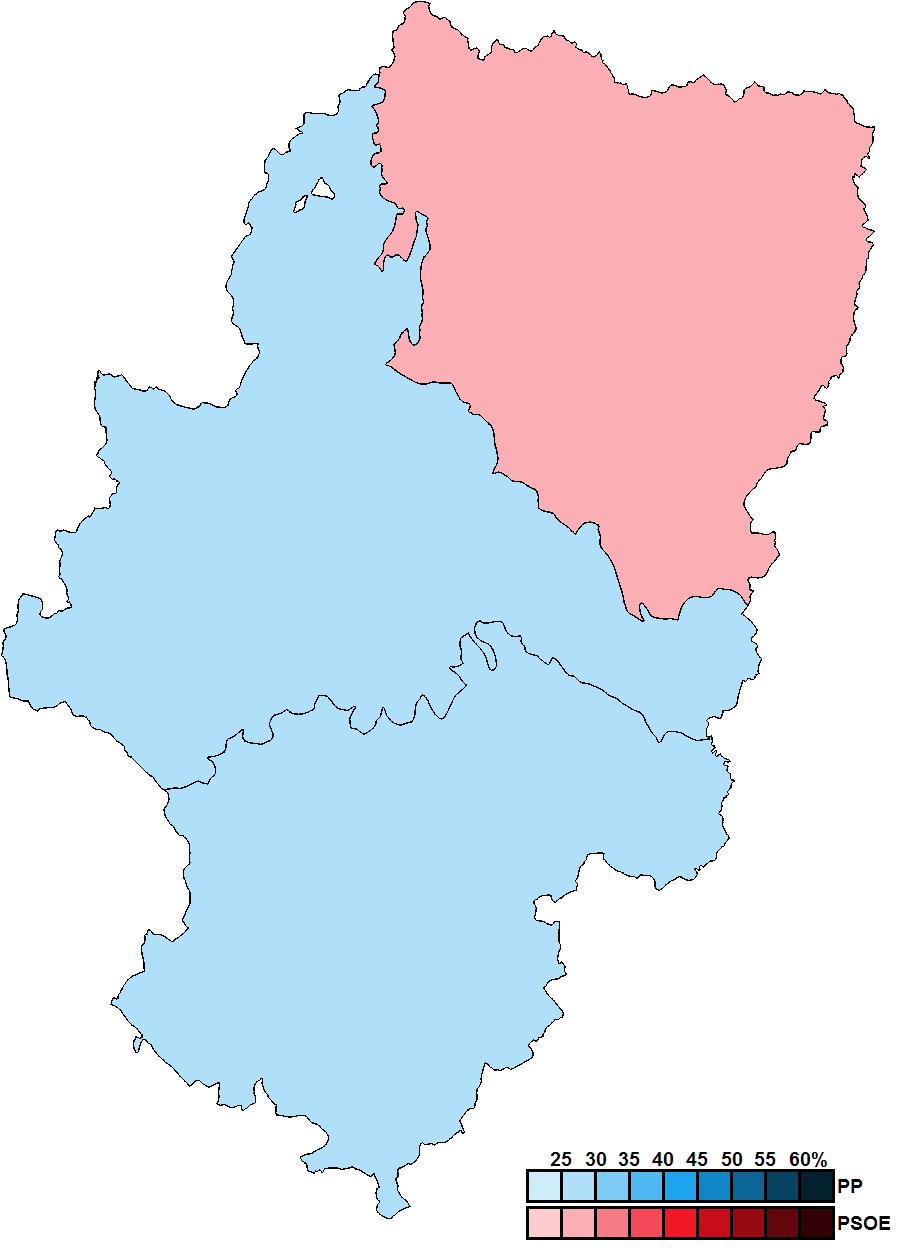
- Constituency results map for the Cortes of Aragon
President before election
Luisa Fernanda Rudi
PP
President after election
Javier Lambán
PSOE

A regional election was held in Aragon on 24 May 2015 to elect the 9th Cortes of the autonomous community. All 67 seats in the Cortes were up for election. It was held concurrently with regional elections in twelve other autonomous communities and local elections all across Spain.

== Overview ==
Under the 2007 Statute of Autonomy, the Cortes of Aragon was the unicameral legislature of the homonymous autonomous community, having legislative power in devolved matters, as well as the ability to grant or withdraw confidence from a regional president. The electoral and procedural rules were supplemented by national law provisions.

=== Date ===
The term of the Cortes of Aragon expired four years after the date of its previous election, unless it was dissolved earlier. The election decree was required to be issued no later than 25 days before the scheduled expiration date of parliament and published on the following day in the Official Gazette of Aragon (BOA), with election day taking place 54 days after the decree's publication. The previous election was held on 22 May 2011, which meant that the chamber's term would have expired on 22 May 2015. The election decree was required to be published in the BOA no later than 28 April 2015, setting the latest possible date for election day on 21 June 2015.

The regional president had the prerogative to dissolve the Cortes of Aragon at any given time and call a snap election, provided that no motion of no confidence was in process and that dissolution did not occur before one year after a previous one. In the event of an investiture process failing to elect a regional president within a two-month period from the Cortes's reconvening, the chamber was to be automatically dissolved and a fresh election called.

The Cortes of Aragon was officially dissolved on 31 March 2015 with the publication of the corresponding decree in the BOA, setting election day for 24 May and scheduling for the chamber to reconvene on 18 June.

=== Electoral system ===
Voting for the Cortes was based on universal suffrage, comprising all Spanish nationals over 18 years of age, registered in Aragon and with full political rights, provided that they had not been deprived of the right to vote by a final sentence, nor were legally incapacitated. Additionally, non-resident citizens were required to apply for voting, a system known as "begged" voting (Spanish: Voto rogado).

The Cortes of Aragon had a minimum of 65 and a maximum of 80 seats, with electoral provisions fixing its size at 67. All were elected in three multi-member constituencies—corresponding to the provinces of Huesca, Teruel and Zaragoza, each of which was assigned an initial minimum of 13 seats and the remaining 28 distributed in proportion to population (with the seat-to-population ratio in the most populated province not exceeding 2.75 times that of the least populated one)—using the D'Hondt method and closed-list proportional voting, with a three percent-threshold of valid votes (including blank ballots) in each constituency. The use of this electoral method resulted in a higher effective threshold depending on district magnitude and vote distribution.

As a result of the aforementioned allocation, each Cortes constituency was entitled the following seats:

Seats	Constituencies
35	Zaragoza
18	Huesca
14	Teruel

The law did not provide for by-elections to fill vacant seats; instead, any vacancies arising after the proclamation of candidates and during the legislative term were filled by the next candidates on the party lists or, when required, by designated substitutes.

=== Outgoing parliament ===
The table below shows the composition of the parliamentary groups in the chamber at the time of dissolution.

Parliamentary composition in March 2015
Groups	Parties	Legislators	
Groups	Parties	Seats	Total
People's Parliamentary Group in the Cortes of Aragon	PP	30	30
Socialist Parliamentary Group	PSOE	22	22
Aragonese Party's Parliamentary Group	PAR	7	7
Aragonese Union Parliamentary Group	CHA	4	4
United Left of Aragon Parliamentary Group	IU	4	4

== Parties and candidates ==
The electoral law allowed for parties and federations registered in the interior ministry, alliances and groupings of electors to present lists of candidates. Parties and federations intending to form an alliance were required to inform the relevant electoral commission within 10 days of the election call, whereas groupings of electors needed to secure the signature of at least one percent of the electorate in the constituencies for which they sought election, disallowing electors from signing for more than one list. Additionally, a balanced composition of men and women was required in the electoral lists, so that candidates of either sex made up at least 40 percent of the total composition.

Below is a list of the main parties and alliances which contested the election:

Candidacy	Parties and alliances	Leading candidate	Ideology	Previous result		Gov.	Ref.
Candidacy	Parties and alliances	Leading candidate	Ideology	Vote %	Seats	Gov.	Ref.
PP	List: People's Party (PP)	Luisa Fernanda Rudi	Conservatism; Christian democracy	39.7%	30	Yes	
PSOE	List: Spanish Socialist Workers' Party (PSOE)	Javier Lambán	Social democracy	29.0%	22	No	
PAR	List: Aragonese Party (PAR)	Arturo Aliaga	Regionalism; Centrism	9.2%	7	Yes	
CHA	List: Aragonese Union (CHA)	José Luis Soro	Aragonese nationalism Eco-socialism	8.2%	4	No	
IU	List: United Left of Aragon (IU) – Communist Party of Aragon (PCE–A) – The Dawn Marxist Organization (La Aurora (OM)) – Republican Left (IR) – Open Left (IzAb)	Patricia Luquin	Socialism; Communism	6.2%	4	No	
UPyD	List: Union, Progress and Democracy (UPyD)	José Luis Lajara	Social liberalism Radical centrism	2.3%	0	No	
Podemos	List: We Can (Podemos)	Pablo Echenique	Left-wing populism Direct democracy Democratic socialism	Did not contest		No	
C's	List: Citizens–Party of the Citizenry (C's)	Susana Gaspar	Liberalism	Did not contest		No	

== Campaign ==
=== Debates ===
2015 Aragonese regional election debates
Date	Organizer(s)	Moderator(s)	P Present (Note: Denotes a main invitee attending the event.) S Surrogate (Note: Denotes a main invitee not attending the event, sending a surrogate in their place.) NI Not invited I Invited A Absent invitee								
Date	Organizer(s)	Moderator(s)	PP	PSOE	PAR	CHA	IU	UPyD	Podemos	Audience	Ref.
11 May	Aragón TV	Pepe Quílez	P Rudi	P Lambán	NI	NI	NI	NI	NI	11.4% (59,000)	
15 May	Aragón TV	Pepe Quílez	S Bermúdez	S Sada	P Aliaga	P Soro	P Luquin	P Lajara	P Echenique	6.4% (31,000)	

== Opinion polls ==
The tables below list opinion polling results in reverse chronological order, showing the most recent first and using the dates when the survey fieldwork was done, as opposed to the date of publication. Where the fieldwork dates are unknown, the date of publication is given instead. The highest percentage figure in each polling survey is displayed with its background shaded in the leading party's colour. If a tie ensues, this is applied to the figures with the highest percentages. The "Lead" column on the right shows the percentage-point difference between the parties with the highest percentages in a poll.

=== Voting intention estimates ===
The table below lists weighted voting intention estimates. Refusals are generally excluded from the party vote percentages, while question wording and the treatment of "don't know" responses and those not intending to vote may vary between polling organisations. When available, seat projections determined by the polling organisations are displayed below (or in place of) the percentages in a smaller font; 34 seats were required for an absolute majority in the Cortes of Aragon.

Color key:

Poll conducted after legal ban on opinion polls Exit poll

Polling firm/Commissioner	Fieldwork date	Sample size	Turnout	PP	PSOE	PAR	CHA	IU	UPyD	Podemos	C's	Lead
2015 regional election	24 May 2015	—N/a	66.3	27.5; 21	21.4; 18	6.9; 6	4.6; 2	4.2; 1	0.9; 0	20.6; 14	9.4; 5	6.1
TNS Demoscopia/RTVE–FORTA	24 May 2015	?	?	27.6; 20/23	20.6; 16/18	6.3; 5/6	5.6; 2/3	3.4; 1/2	–	21.0; 14/16	10.4; 7/8	6.6
GAD3/Antena 3	11–22 May 2015	?	?	? 20/22	? 16/17	? 3/5	? 2/3	? 2	–	? 12/13	? 8/9	?
NC Report/La Razón	17 May 2015	550	?	30.2; 23/24	25.1; 19/20	6.1; 4/5	5.7; 2/3	5.5; 2/3	1.0; 0	11.2; 8/9	12.5; 7/8	5.1
Metroscopia/El País	4–5 May 2015	1,000	75.6	23.9; 19	21.9; 16	3.0; 3	2.9; 1	7.0; 4	–	22.5; 14	15.9; 10	1.4
Intercampo/Podemos	15–30 Apr 2015	1,800	?	24.0– 28.0	19.0– 20.0	3.0– 5.0	2.0– 4.0	1.0– 3.0	1.0– 2.0	23.0– 26.0	19.0– 20.0	1.0– 2.0
GAD3/ABC	20–29 Apr 2015	1,000	?	28.4; 19/22	21.1; 15/16	4.6; 3/4	3.9; 2/3	5.3; 2/3	0.8; 0	15.7; 10/12	16.2; 11/12	7.3
CIS	23 Mar–20 Apr 2015	1,586	?	29.7; 23/24	22.4; 17	5.7; 4	5.0; 2	5.4; 3	1.5; 0	14.1; 9	12.9; 8/9	7.3
A+M/Heraldo de Aragón	6–17 Apr 2015	2,000	?	28.0; 19/22	20.9; 15/18	8.3; 4/7	7.2; 3/4	5.0; 1/2	0.9; 0	14.9; 11/14	11.3; 7/11	7.1
NC Report/La Razón	20 Mar–9 Apr 2015	550	?	30.8; 23/24	26.4; 20/21	6.8; 4/5	6.3; 2/3	4.3; 1/2	1.1; 0	11.5; 8/9	10.4; 7/8	4.4
Llorente & Cuenca	31 Oct 2014	?	?	? 21/25	? 17/19	? 6/7	? 2/6	? 4/6	? 2	? 9/14	–	?
2014 EP election	25 May 2014	—N/a	45.7	27.9 (24)	24.3 (21)	–	4.5 (2)	9.4 (7)	8.5 (5)	9.5 (7)	2.9 (1)	3.6
A+M/Heraldo de Aragón	10 Mar–3 Apr 2014	2,000	56.0	31.2; 22/26	29.6; 21/25	7.0; 4/6	6.8; 4/7	9.3; 6/9	8.5; 5/8	–	–	1.6
NC Report/La Razón	15 Oct–12 Nov 2013	?	?	? 27/28	? 21/22	? 6/7	? 6/7	? 6/7	? 0/2	–	–	?
NC Report/La Razón	15 Apr–10 May 2013	300	?	36.3; 28/29	27.1; 21/22	? 6/7	? 4/5	? 4/5	–	–	–	9.2
A+M/Heraldo de Aragón	23 Apr 2013	?	53.1	32.2; 23/26	28.7; 21/24	8.4; 6/9	10.1; 6/9	9.7; 5/8	3.8; 1/3	–	–	3.5
2011 general election	20 Nov 2011	—N/a	71.0	47.7 (36)	31.5 (23)	(Note: Within PP.)	(Note: Within IU.)	10.5 (6)	5.8 (2)	–	–	16.2
2011 regional election	22 May 2011	—N/a	67.9	39.7; 30	29.0; 22	9.2; 7	8.2; 4	6.2; 4	2.3; 0	–	–	10.7

=== Voting preferences ===
The table below lists raw, unweighted voting preferences.

Polling firm/Commissioner	Fieldwork date	Sample size	PP	PSOE	PAR	CHA	IU	UPyD	Podemos	C's	Question	X mark	Lead
2015 regional election (Note: Does not include non-resident citizens.)	24 May 2015	—N/a	18.5	14.4	4.6	3.1	2.8	0.6	13.8	6.3	—N/a	31.7	4.1
CIS	23 Mar–20 Apr 2015	1,586	14.1	13.0	1.4	1.5	3.2	0.5	11.0	7.1	37.8	8.0	1.1
2014 EP election	25 May 2014	—N/a	12.9	11.2	–	2.1	4.3	3.9	4.4	1.3	—N/a	53.1	1.7
2011 general election	20 Nov 2011	—N/a	34.1	22.5			7.5	4.1	–	–	—N/a	27.4	11.6
2011 regional election	22 May 2011	—N/a	27.2	19.8	6.3	5.6	4.2	1.6	–	–	—N/a	30.6	7.4

=== Victory preferences ===
The table below lists opinion polling on the victory preferences for each party in the event of a regional election taking place.

Polling firm/Commissioner	Fieldwork date	Sample size	PP	PSOE	PAR	CHA	IU	UPyD	Podemos	C's	Other/ None	Question	Lead
CIS	23 Mar–20 Apr 2015	1,586	18.4	17.6	2.1	2.2	4.1	0.7	13.1	9.0	7.0	25.8	0.8

=== Victory likelihood ===
The table below lists opinion polling on the perceived likelihood of victory for each party in the event of a regional election taking place.

Polling firm/Commissioner	Fieldwork date	Sample size	PP	PSOE	PAR	CHA	IU	Podemos	C's	Other/ None	Question	Lead
CIS	23 Mar–20 Apr 2015	1,586	29.5	25.1	0.2	0.2	0.1	3.3	0.8	2.0	38.9	4.4

=== Preferred President ===
The table below lists opinion polling on leader preferences to become president of the Government of Aragon.

Polling firm/Commissioner	Fieldwork date	Sample size									Other/ None/ Not care	Question	Lead
Polling firm/Commissioner	Fieldwork date	Sample size	Rudi PP	Lambán PSOE	Aliaga PAR	Soro CHA	Luquin IU	Lajara UPyD	Echenique Podemos	Gaspar C's	Other/ None/ Not care	Question	Lead
CIS (Note: Responses denoting a party's generic candidate are aggregated to that party's main candidate/leader at the time of the poll.)	23 Mar–20 Apr 2015	1,586	20.2	10.8	2.2	1.3	2.0	0.1	5.1	2.2	1.8	54.3	9.4

== Results ==
=== Overall ===
← Summary of the 24 May 2015 Cortes of Aragon election results →
Parties and alliances	Popular vote			Seats	
Parties and alliances	Votes	%	±pp	Total	+/−
People's Party (PP)	183,654	27.50	−12.19	21	−9
Spanish Socialist Workers' Party (PSOE)	143,096	21.43	−7.59	18	−4
We Can (Podemos)	137,325	20.56	New	14	+14
Citizens–Party of the Citizenry (C's)	62,907	9.42	New	5	+5
Aragonese Party (PAR)	45,846	6.86	−2.29	6	−1
Aragonese Union (CHA)	30,618	4.58	−3.65	2	−2
United Left of Aragon (IU)	28,184	4.22	−1.94	1	−3
Union, Progress and Democracy (UPyD)	5,708	0.85	−1.46	0	±0
Blank Seats (EB)	5,323	0.80	New	0	±0
Animalist Party Against Mistreatment of Animals (PACMA)	4,946	0.74	+0.42	0	±0
Commitment with Aragon (CCA)	2,844	0.43	−0.12	0	±0
Equo (Equo)	1,256	0.19	New	0	±0
Zero Cuts (Recortes Cero)	1,082	0.16	New	0	±0
Federation of Independents of Aragon (FIA)	648	0.10	−0.04	0	±0
Communist Party of the Peoples of Spain (PCPE)	616	0.09	New	0	±0
Aragonese Bloc (BAR)	581	0.09	New	0	±0
Blank ballots	13,224	1.98	−1.21		
Total	667,858			67	±0
Valid votes	667,858	98.70	+0.20		
Invalid votes	8,796	1.30	−0.20		
Votes cast / turnout	676,654	66.33	−1.57		
Abstentions	343,452	33.67	+1.57		
Registered voters	1,020,106				

Popular vote
PP	27.50%
PSOE	21.43%
Podemos	20.56%
C's	9.42%
PAR	6.86%
CHA	4.58%
IU	4.22%
Others	3.44%
Blank ballots	1.98%

Seats
PP	31.34%
PSOE	26.87%
Podemos	20.90%
PAR	8.96%
C's	7.46%
CHA	2.99%
IU	1.49%

=== Distribution by constituency ===
Constituency	PP		PSOE		Podemos		C's		PAR		CHA		IU	
Constituency	%	S	%	S	%	S	%	S	%	S	%	S	%	S
Huesca	26.2	5	26.4	6	18.6	4	8.4	1	9.2	2	3.1	−	3.3	−
Teruel	27.5	5	22.0	4	16.1	2	7.2	1	13.7	2	3.4	−	4.6	−
Zaragoza	27.8	11	20.1	8	21.7	8	10.0	3	5.2	2	5.1	2	4.4	1
Total	27.5	21	21.4	18	20.6	14	9.4	5	6.9	6	4.6	2	4.2	1

== Aftermath ==
=== Government formation ===
Investiture; Nomination of Javier Lambán (PSOE)
Ballot →	3 July 2015
Required majority →	34 out of 67
Yes: • PSOE (18); • Podemos (14); • CHA (2); • IU (1)	35 / 67
No: • PP (21); • PAR (6); • C's (5)	32 / 67
Abstentions	0 / 67
Absentees	0 / 67

== Bibliography ==
- Ley Orgánica 5/1985, de 19 de junio, del Régimen Electoral General (Organic Law 5/1985). Official State Gazette (in Spanish). 19 June 1985 [version as of 31 March 2015]. BOE-A-1985-11672.
- Ley 2/1987, de 16 de febrero, Electoral de la Comunidad Autónoma de Aragón (Law 2/1987). Official State Gazette (in Spanish). 16 February 1987 [version as of 17 April 1999]. BOE-A-1987-5339.
- Ley Orgánica 5/2007, de 20 de abril, de reforma del Estatuto de Autonomía de Aragón (Organic Law 5/2007). Official State Gazette (in Spanish). 20 April 2007 [version as of 19 July 2011]. BOE-A-2007-8444.
- Ley 2/2009, de 11 de mayo, del Presidente y del Gobierno de Aragón (Law 2/2009). Official State Gazette (in Spanish). 11 May 2009 [version as of 31 December 2012]. BOE-A-2009-9390.
- Decreto de 30 de marzo de 2015, de la Presidenta de Aragón, por el que se convocan elecciones a las Cortes de Aragón (Decree). Official Gazette of Aragon (in Spanish). 30 March 2015. BOA20150331001.
