= Daniel Pérez Calvo =

Spanish politician (born 1966)

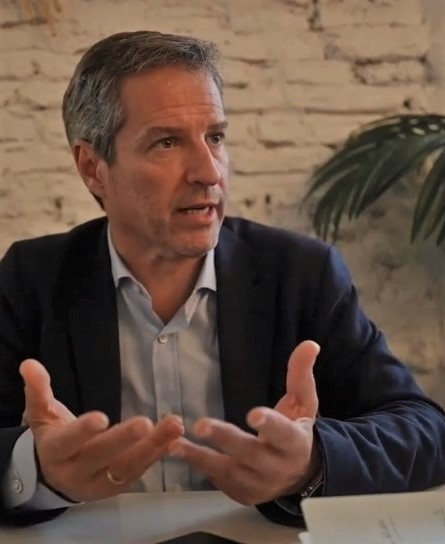

Vice Secretary-General of Citizens
- In office 5 May 2021 – 15 January 2023
- Leader: Inés Arrimadas

Member of the Cortes of Aragon
- In office 20 June 2019 – 23 June 2023
- Constituency: Zaragoza

Personal details
- Born: 1966 (age 59–60) Barcelona, Spain
- Party: Citizens (since 2019)
- Education: University of Navarre
- Occupation: Journalist, politician

Daniel Pérez Calvo (born 1966) is a Spanish journalist and politician. After working for Atresmedia from 1991 to 2019, he joined the Citizens party and led them in the 2019 Aragonese regional election, where they increased their number of seats from 5 to 12. He resigned as leader after the party lost all their seats in the 2023 election.

== Journalistic career ==
Born in Barcelona, Pérez Calvo graduated in Information Sciences from the University of Navarre. He spent most of his journalistic career with Atresmedia, joining their Zaragoza delegation as an editor in 1991. In February 2012, he was named as regional director of Atresmedia's radio station Onda Cero and regional delegate of its television channel Antena 3, following the death of his predecessor Ricardo Lizarraga.

== Political career ==
In January 2019, Pérez Calvo was chosen by Citizens leader Albert Rivera to be their officially endorsed candidate in primaries to lead the party in the 2019 Aragonese regional election, replacing Susana Gaspar. In March, he won the eight-man primary with 81% of the votes, in which he was the only candidate not registered as a party member.

Citizens came third in the May 2019 elections, increasing their seats from 5 to 12 and their percentage from 9.4% to 16.7%. Pérez Calvo was open to forming a coalition with the Spanish Socialist Workers' Party (PSOE) of incumbent regional president Javier Lambán, who instead chose to pact with left-wing parties for his second government.

In May 2021, Citizens' national leader Inés Arrimadas named Pérez Calvo the party's vice secretary-general. A new administration was elected in January 2023, with Patricia Guasp as the new leader and Madrid councillor Mariano Fuentes succeeding Pérez Calvo.

Pérez Calvo resigned as the party's regional leader after they lost all 12 seats in the 2023 Aragonese regional election.
