= Joaquín Palacín =

Spanish politician (1974–2026)

Joaquín Palacín Eltoro
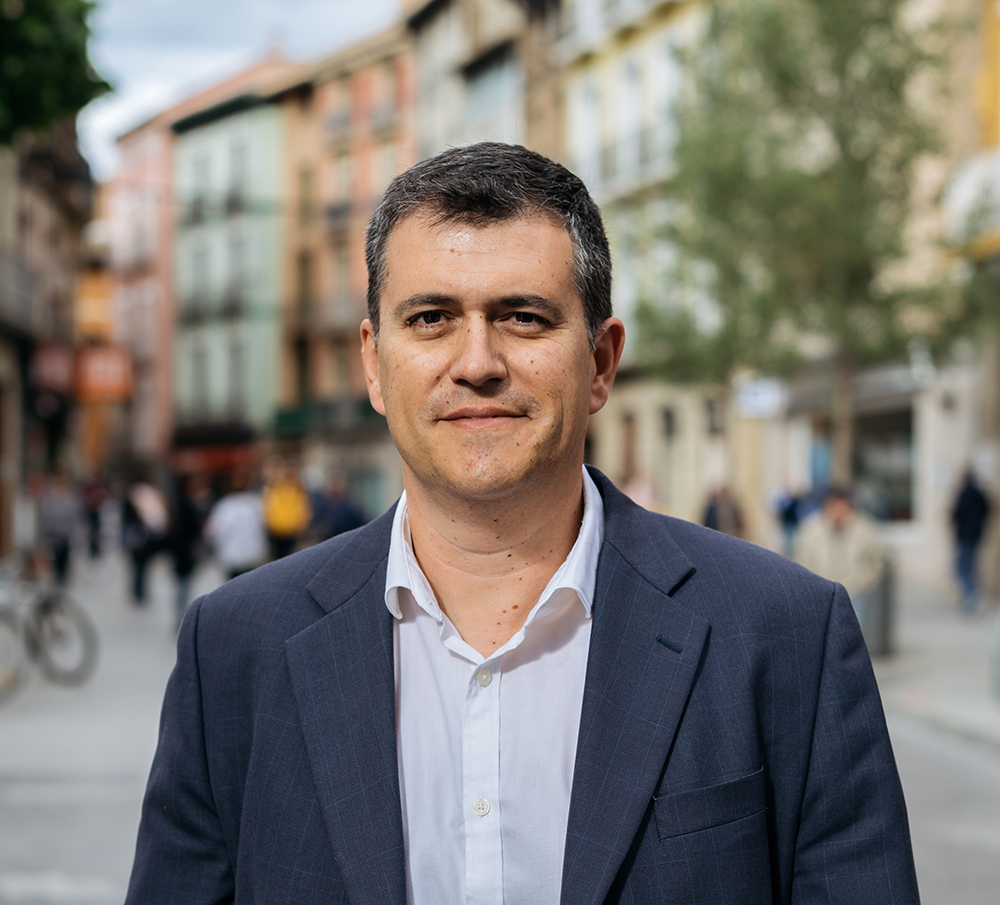
- Palacín in 2019

Member of the Cortes of Aragon for Huesca
- In office 21 July 2011 – 5 March 2026

Personal details
- Born: 5 July 1974 Huesca, Spain
- Died: 5 March 2026 (aged 51) Aínsa, Spain
- Party: CHA
- Occupation: Marketing manager

Joaquín Palacín Eltoro (5 July 1974 – 5 March 2026) was a Spanish politician. A leader of the Chunta Aragonesista, he served in the Cortes of Aragon from 2011 to 2026.

Palacín died following a long illness in Aínsa, on 5 March 2026, at the age of 51.
