= Luis María Beamonte =

Spanish politician

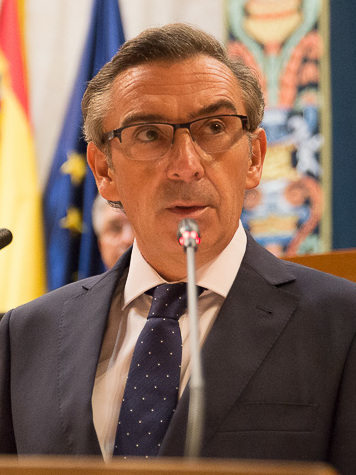

Luis María Beamonte Mesa (born 10 September 1963) is a Spanish People's Party politician, elected to the Congress of Deputies in 2023. He was a member of the Cortes of Aragon (2011; 2015–2023), where he led his party from 2019 to 2021. He was previously the mayor of Tarazona (2007–2019) and president of the provincial deputation of the Province of Zaragoza (2011–2015).

== Biography ==
Born in Tudela, Navarre, Beamonte studied Law at the University of Zaragoza from 1982 to 1989, but did not finish his course until 2017, when his degree was awarded by King Juan Carlos University in Madrid. Elected a city councillor in Tarazona in the Province of Zaragoza in 2003, he became mayor four years later and president of the province's branch of the People's Party (PP) in 2008. In 2011, after winning a second term as mayor, he was also invested as president of the provincial deputation with support from the Aragonese Party (PAR), ending 12 years of Spanish Socialist Workers' Party (PSOE) governance.

Beamonte was also elected to the Cortes of Aragon in the 2011 elections, but resigned in August of the same year to concentrate on his other offices. In June 2015, he earned a third term as mayor, with the PP taking 10 of 17 seats in the city hall. Later the same month, he lost his provincial office to the PSOE's Juan Antonio Sánchez Quero, the mayor of Tobed.

In March 2017, Beamonte was elected president of the People's Party of Aragon, with 97.8% of the votes. In December 2018, he was named the party's lead candidate for the 2019 Aragonese regional election. The party came second, and would have formed a majority if it formed a pact with Citizens, Vox and the PAR. This did not come to be, as incumbent president Javier Lambán's PSOE formed a government with Podemos, the Chunta Aragonesista and the PAR. In the same year, he did not run for re-election as mayor of Tarazona.

In October 2021, Beamonte said that he would not run again for leader of the regional PP, endorsing the mayor of Zaragoza, Jorge Azcón to replace him in December. Beamonte was replaced as PP spokesperson in the Cortes of Aragon by Mar Vaquero in January 2022.

In the 2023 Spanish general election, Beamonte led the PP list in the Zaragoza constituency. His party took seven of the thirteen seats.
