= 2019 Aragonese regional election =

Election in the Spanish region of Aragon

- 26 May 2019

All 67 seats in the Cortes of Aragon 34 seats needed for a majority
- Opinion polls
- Registered: 1,018,530 ▼0.2%
- Turnout: 673,880 (66.2%) ▼0.1 pp
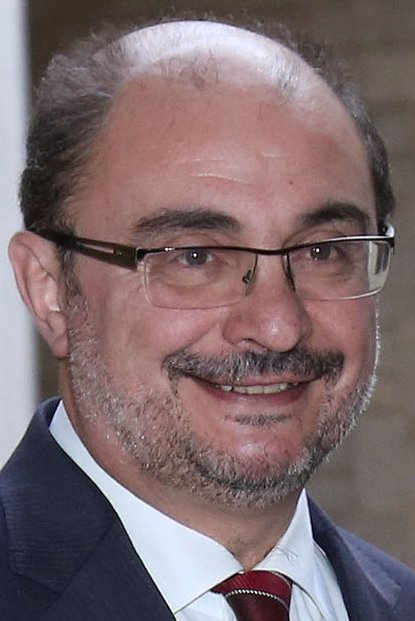

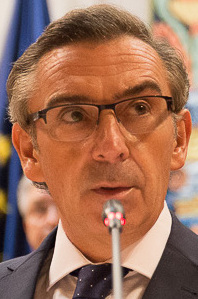

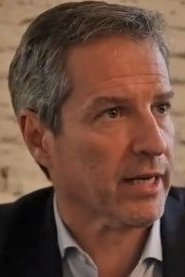

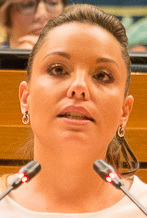

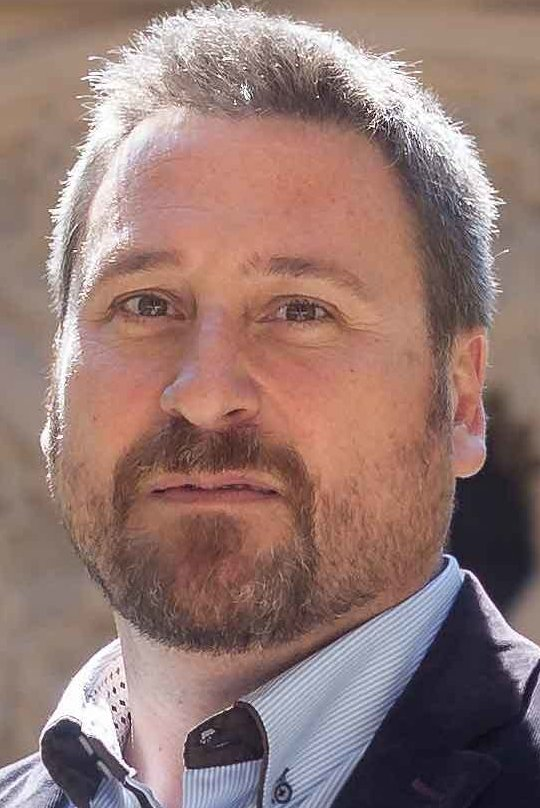

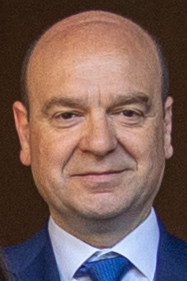

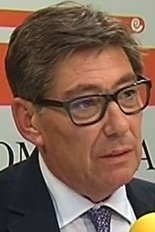

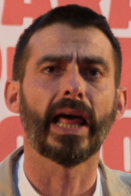
	First party	Second party	Third party
Leader	Javier Lambán	Luis María Beamonte	Daniel Pérez Calvo
Party	PSOE	PP	Cs
Leader since	31 March 2012	25 March 2017	2 March 2019
Leader's seat	Zaragoza	Zaragoza	Zaragoza
Last election	18 seats, 21.4%	21 seats, 27.5%	5 seats, 9.4%
Seats won	24	16	12
Seat change	▲6	▼5	▲7
Popular vote	206,400	139,660	111,602
Percentage	30.8%	20.9%	16.7%
Swing	▲9.4 pp	▼6.6 pp	▲7.3 pp
	Fourth party	Fifth party	Sixth party
Leader	Maru Díaz	José Luis Soro	Santiago Morón
Party	Podemos–Equo	CHA	Vox
Leader since	27 November 2018	11 February 2012	22 April 2019
Leader's seat	Zaragoza	Zaragoza	Zaragoza
Last election	14 seats, 20.8% (Note: Results for Podemos (20.6%, 14 seats) and Equo (0.2%, 0 seats) in the 2015 election.)	2 seats, 4.6%	Did not contest
Seats won	5	3	3
Seat change	▼9	▲1	▲3
Popular vote	54,252	41,879	40,671
Percentage	8.1%	6.3%	6.1%
Swing	▼12.7 pp	▲1.7 pp	New party
	Seventh party	Eighth party
Leader	Arturo Aliaga	Álvaro Sanz
Party	PAR	IU
Leader since	29 November 2014	25 March 2017
Leader's seat	Zaragoza	Zaragoza
Last election	6 seats, 6.9%	1 seat, 4.2%
Seats won	3	1
Seat change	▼3	0
Popular vote	33,978	22,229
Percentage	5.1%	3.3%
Swing	▼1.8 pp	▼0.9 pp
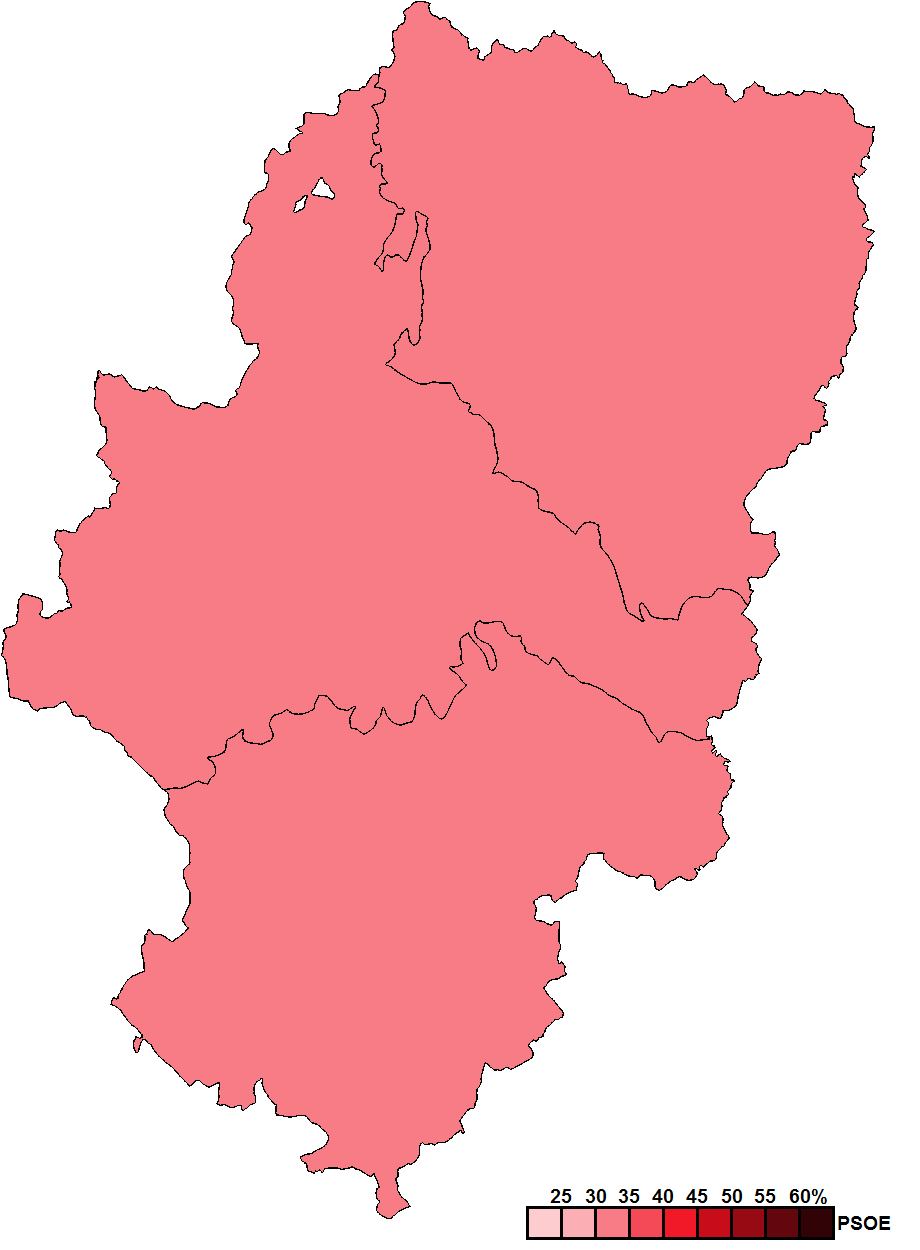
- Constituency results map for the Cortes of Aragon
President before election
Javier Lambán
PSOE
President after election
Javier Lambán
PSOE

A regional election was held in Aragon on 26 May 2019 to elect the 10th Cortes of the autonomous community. All 67 seats in the Cortes were up for election. It was held concurrently with regional elections in eleven other autonomous communities and local elections all across Spain, as well as the 2019 European Parliament election.

The election resulted in the most fragmented parliament to date, with up to eight parliamentary groups being formed. The Spanish Socialist Workers' Party (PSOE) of regional president Javier Lambán emerged as the largest political party and was able to retain government throughout a diverse coalition agreement including Podemos, the Aragonese Party (PAR) and the Aragonese Union (CHA). The People's Party (PP) obtained the worst result in its history, whereas Citizens (Cs) emerged with a strong third-place position. The far-right, represented by Vox, entered parliament for the first time.

== Overview ==
Under the 2007 Statute of Autonomy, the Cortes of Aragon was the unicameral legislature of the homonymous autonomous community, having legislative power in devolved matters, as well as the ability to grant or withdraw confidence from a regional president. The electoral and procedural rules were supplemented by national law provisions.

=== Date ===
The term of the Cortes of Aragon expired four years after the date of its previous election, unless it was dissolved earlier. The election decree was required to be issued no later than 25 days before the scheduled expiration date of parliament and published on the following day in the Official Gazette of Aragon (BOA), with election day taking place 54 days after the decree's publication. The previous election was held on 24 May 2015, which meant that the chamber's term would have expired on 24 May 2019. The election decree was required to be published in the BOA no later than 30 April 2019, setting the latest possible date for election day on 23 June 2019.

The regional president had the prerogative to dissolve the Cortes of Aragon at any given time and call a snap election, provided that no motion of no confidence was in process and that dissolution did not occur before one year after a previous one. In the event of an investiture process failing to elect a regional president within a two-month period from the Cortes's reconvening, the chamber was to be automatically dissolved and a fresh election called.

The Cortes of Aragon was officially dissolved on 2 April 2019 with the publication of the corresponding decree in the BOA, setting election day for 26 May and scheduling for the chamber to reconvene on 20 June.

=== Electoral system ===
Voting for the Cortes was based on universal suffrage, comprising all Spanish nationals over 18 years of age, registered in Aragon and with full political rights, provided that they had not been deprived of the right to vote by a final sentence. (Note: Amendments in 2018 granted the right to vote to those legally incapacitated.) Additionally, non-resident citizens were required to apply for voting, a system known as "begged" voting (Spanish: Voto rogado).

The Cortes of Aragon had a minimum of 65 and a maximum of 80 seats, with electoral provisions fixing its size at 67. All were elected in three multi-member constituencies—corresponding to the provinces of Huesca, Teruel and Zaragoza, each of which was assigned an initial minimum of 13 seats and the remaining 28 distributed in proportion to population (with the seat-to-population ratio in the most populated province not exceeding 2.75 times that of the least populated one)—using the D'Hondt method and closed-list proportional voting, with a three percent-threshold of valid votes (including blank ballots) in each constituency. The use of this electoral method resulted in a higher effective threshold depending on district magnitude and vote distribution.

As a result of the aforementioned allocation, each Cortes constituency was entitled the following seats:

Seats	Constituencies
35	Zaragoza
18	Huesca
14	Teruel

The law did not provide for by-elections to fill vacant seats; instead, any vacancies arising after the proclamation of candidates and during the legislative term were filled by the next candidates on the party lists or, when required, by designated substitutes.

=== Outgoing parliament ===
The table below shows the composition of the parliamentary groups in the chamber at the time of dissolution.

Parliamentary composition in April 2019
Groups	Parties	Legislators	
Groups	Parties	Seats	Total
People's Parliamentary Group in the Cortes of Aragon	PP	21	21
Socialist Parliamentary Group	PSOE	18	18
We Can Aragon Parliamentary Group	Podemos	14	14
Aragonese Parliamentary Group	PAR	6	6
Citizens–Party of the Citizenry Parliamentary Group	Cs	5	5
Mixed Parliamentary Group	CHA	2	3
Mixed Parliamentary Group	IU	1	3

== Parties and candidates ==
The electoral law allowed for parties and federations registered in the interior ministry, alliances and groupings of electors to present lists of candidates. Parties and federations intending to form an alliance were required to inform the relevant electoral commission within 10 days of the election call, whereas groupings of electors needed to secure the signature of at least one percent of the electorate in the constituencies for which they sought election, disallowing electors from signing for more than one list. Additionally, a balanced composition of men and women was required in the electoral lists, so that candidates of either sex made up at least 40 percent of the total composition.

Below is a list of the main parties and alliances which contested the election:

Candidacy	Parties and alliances	Leading candidate	Ideology	Previous result		Gov.	Ref.
Candidacy	Parties and alliances	Leading candidate	Ideology	Vote %	Seats	Gov.	Ref.
PP	List: People's Party (PP)	Luis María Beamonte	Conservatism; Christian democracy	27.5%	21	No	
PSOE	List: Spanish Socialist Workers' Party (PSOE)	Javier Lambán	Social democracy	21.4%	18	Yes	
Podemos– Equo	List: We Can (Podemos); Equo (Equo)	Maru Díaz	Left-wing populism Direct democracy Democratic socialism	20.8%	14	No	
PAR	List: Aragonese Party (PAR)	Arturo Aliaga	Regionalism; Centrism	6.9%	6	No	
Cs	List: Citizens–Party of the Citizenry (Cs)	Daniel Pérez Calvo	Liberalism	9.4%	5	No	
CHA	List: Aragonese Union (CHA)	José Luis Soro	Aragonese nationalism Eco-socialism	4.6%	2	Yes	
IU	List: United Left of Aragon (IU) – Communist Party of Aragon (PCE–A) – The Dawn Marxist Organization (La Aurora (OM)) – Republican Left (IR) – Feminist Party of Spain (PFE)	Álvaro Sanz	Socialism; Communism	4.2%	1	No	
Vox	List: Vox (Vox)	Santiago Morón	Right-wing populism Ultranationalism; National conservatism	Did not contest		No	

== Campaign ==
=== Party slogans ===
Party or alliance	Original slogan	English translation	Ref.
PP	« Piensa en Aragón »	"Think of Aragon"	
PSOE	« Juntos por Aragón »	"Together for Aragon"	
Podemos–Equo	« Aragón, contigo »	"Aragon, with you"	
PAR	« El centro necesario »	"The necessary centre"	
Cs	« Vamos Aragón »	"Let's go Aragon"	
CHA	« Construimos Aragón contigo » « CHA cumple »	"We build Aragon with you" "CHA delivers"	
IU	« Tu izquierda »	"Your left"	
Vox	« Tu voz en Aragón »	"Your voice in Aragon"	

=== Debates ===
2019 Aragonese regional election debates
Date	Organizer(s)	Moderator(s)	P Present (Note: Denotes a main invitee attending the event.) S Surrogate (Note: Denotes a main invitee not attending the event, sending a surrogate in their place.) NI Not invited I Invited A Absent invitee									
Date	Organizer(s)	Moderator(s)	PP	PSOE	Podemos	PAR	Cs	CHA	IU	Vox	Audience	Ref.
9 May	Heraldo de Aragón	Mikel Iturbe	P Beamonte	P Lambán	P Díaz	P Aliaga	P P. Calvo	P Soro	P Sanz	P Morón	—	
14 May	Aragón TV	Inma Otal	P Beamonte	P Lambán	P Díaz	P Aliaga	P P. Calvo	P Soro	P Sanz	P Morón	5.7% (24,500)	

== Opinion polls ==
The tables below list opinion polling results in reverse chronological order, showing the most recent first and using the dates when the survey fieldwork was done, as opposed to the date of publication. Where the fieldwork dates are unknown, the date of publication is given instead. The highest percentage figure in each polling survey is displayed with its background shaded in the leading party's colour. If a tie ensues, this is applied to the figures with the highest percentages. The "Lead" column on the right shows the percentage-point difference between the parties with the highest percentages in a poll.

=== Voting intention estimates ===
The table below lists weighted voting intention estimates. Refusals are generally excluded from the party vote percentages, while question wording and the treatment of "don't know" responses and those not intending to vote may vary between polling organisations. When available, seat projections determined by the polling organisations are displayed below (or in place of) the percentages in a smaller font; 34 seats were required for an absolute majority in the Cortes of Aragon.

Color key:

Poll conducted after legal ban on opinion polls Exit poll

Polling firm/Commissioner	Fieldwork date	Sample size	Turnout	PP	PSOE	Podemos	Cs	PAR	CHA	IU	Vox	Unidas Podemos	Lead
2019 regional election	26 May 2019	—N/a	66.2	20.9; 16	30.8; 24	8.1; 5	16.7; 12	5.1; 3	6.3; 3	3.3; 1	6.1; 3	–	9.9
GfK/FORTA	26 May 2019	11,896	?	17.9; 13/15	32.9; 24/27	10.5; 6/7	14.3; 8/10	4.9; 3/4	7.2; 2/3	4.2; 1/2	5.2; 2/3	–	15.0
ElectoPanel/Electomanía	22–23 May 2019	?	?	19.0; 13	30.0; 24	13.3; 8	16.2; 12	5.9; 4	5.3; 2	2.1; 0	7.1; 4	–	11.0
ElectoPanel/Electomanía	21–22 May 2019	?	?	19.4; 14	30.0; 24	13.1; 8	15.9; 11	5.9; 4	5.4; 2	2.0; 0	6.9; 4	–	10.6
ElectoPanel/Electomanía	20–21 May 2019	?	?	19.3; 13	30.1; 24	13.3; 8	15.7; 11	6.0; 4	5.2; 2	1.8; 0	7.5; 5	–	10.8
ElectoPanel/Electomanía	19–20 May 2019	?	?	19.1; 13	30.0; 24	13.4; 8	16.0; 12	5.8; 4	5.1; 2	1.8; 0	7.2; 4	–	10.9
KeyData/Público	19 May 2019	?	68.7	18.3; 14	25.4; 21	12.9; 9	18.4; 12	6.5; 5	3.5; 1	3.9; 1	7.5; 4	–	7.0
NC Report/La Razón	19 May 2019	?	?	21.7; 17	28.1; 24	? 9	? 10	? 4	? 1	? 1	? 1	–	6.4
Sigma Dos/El Mundo	19 May 2019	?	?	19.6; 14/15	30.8; 23/25	13.1; 7/10	13.8; 9/11	6.5; 4	4.9; 2	1.8; 0	7.7; 4	–	11.2
ElectoPanel/Electomanía	16–19 May 2019	?	?	19.0; 13	29.5; 24	13.7; 8	17.1; 12	5.7; 4	5.0; 2	1.9; 0	7.3; 4	–	10.5
ElectoPanel/Electomanía	13–16 May 2019	?	?	17.3; 13	29.7; 24	12.2; 8	18.6; 12	5.6; 4	5.4; 2	2.3; 0	7.4; 4	–	11.1
ElectoPanel/Electomanía	10–13 May 2019	?	?	16.7; 12	28.4; 23	12.3; 8	19.5; 13	5.5; 4	5.5; 2	2.2; 0	8.1; 5	–	8.9
A+M/Heraldo de Aragón	6–11 May 2019	?	71.2	20.5; 14/16	25.3; 19/22	15.1; 10/11	16.7; 11/12	6.5; 4	4.9; 2	3.8; 1	5.5; 2/4	–	4.8
ElectoPanel/Electomanía	7–10 May 2019	?	?	16.6; 12	28.0; 22	12.6; 8	19.9; 15	4.9; 3	5.7; 2	2.6; 0	8.8; 5	–	8.1
ElectoPanel/Electomanía	4–7 May 2019	?	?	16.2; 12	27.9; 22	12.0; 8	20.6; 15	4.7; 3	6.0; 2	2.5; 0	8.8; 5	–	7.3
ElectoPanel/Electomanía	29 Apr–4 May 2019	?	?	15.9; 12	28.0; 22	11.9; 8	21.1; 15	4.8; 3	6.1; 2	2.4; 0	8.6; 5	–	6.9
April 2019 general election	28 Apr 2019	—N/a	75.2	18.9 (14)	31.7 (23)	(Note: Within Unidas Podemos.)	20.5 (15)	–	–		12.2 (7)	13.6 (8)	11.2
CIS	21 Mar–23 Apr 2019	892	?	22.2; 18/19	26.4; 20/22	15.0; 10/12	12.7; 9/10	6.0; 3/4	3.9; 0/1	4.8; 3	3.0; 0	–	4.2
ElectoPanel/Electomanía	31 Mar–7 Apr 2019	?	?	21.9; 16	25.3; 21	11.9; 8	12.2; 8	4.5; 3	6.2; 2	2.4; 0	12.7; 9	–	3.4
ElectoPanel/Electomanía	24–31 Mar 2019	?	?	21.3; 16	25.4; 22	11.6; 8	12.6; 8	4.5; 3	6.1; 2	2.6; 0	12.7; 8	–	4.1
ElectoPanel/Electomanía	17–24 Mar 2019	?	?	21.6; 16	26.2; 22		12.4; 8	4.6; 3	6.5; 2		11.3; 8	11.7; 8	4.6
ElectoPanel/Electomanía	10–17 Mar 2019	?	?	22.0; 17	25.0; 19		11.6; 8	4.6; 3	6.4; 2		13.1; 11	11.6; 7	3.0
ElectoPanel/Electomanía	3–10 Mar 2019	?	?	21.6; 16	24.7; 19		12.1; 8	4.8; 3	6.2; 2		13.0; 11	11.8; 8	3.1
ElectoPanel/Electomanía	22 Feb–3 Mar 2019	?	?	21.4; 15	24.7; 19		12.4; 8	6.0; 4	4.9; 2		12.9; 12	12.0; 7	3.3
A+M/Heraldo de Aragón	1–2 Oct 2018	1,200	65.2	22.3; 16/19	23.6; 17/19		21.4; 15/17	5.7; 3	3.2; 1		2.7; 0/1	17.3; 11/12	1.3
A+M/Heraldo de Aragón	11–15 Apr 2018	5,600	64.6	23.8; 17/20	25.1; 18/20	12.7; 8/10	22.1; 15/16	5.9; 3	3.5; 1	4.3; 2	–	–	1.3
SyM Consulting	15–18 Mar 2018	1,800	70.4	20.0; 16/17	24.1; 18/20	14.2; 8/11	17.6; 10/13	8.4; 6/7	6.3; 2	4.7; 1/2	–	–	4.1
A+M/Heraldo de Aragón	22–27 Nov 2017	2,000	68.9	26.3; 19/22	25.0; 19/21	13.6; 9/10	15.3; 11/12	5.4; 3/4	3.2; 1	5.5; 3/4	–	–	1.3
2016 general election	26 Jun 2016	—N/a	69.9	35.8 (26)	24.8 (18)		16.2 (11)	(Note: Within PP.)	–		0.3 (0)	19.7 (12)	11.0
2015 general election	20 Dec 2015	—N/a	72.6	31.3 (23)	23.0 (17)	18.6 (12)	17.2 (12)		(Note: Within IU–UPeC.)	6.2 (3)	0.3 (0)	–	8.3
2015 regional election	24 May 2015	—N/a	66.3	27.5; 21	21.4; 18	20.6; 14	9.4; 5	6.9; 6	4.6; 2	4.2; 1	–	–	6.1

=== Voting preferences ===
The table below lists raw, unweighted voting preferences.

Polling firm/Commissioner	Fieldwork date	Sample size	PP	PSOE	Podemos	Cs	PAR	CHA	IU	Vox	Unidas Podemos	Question	X mark	Lead
2019 regional election (Note: Does not include non-resident citizens.)	26 May 2019	—N/a	14.1	20.8	5.5	11.3	3.4	4.2	2.2	4.1	–	—N/a	31.9	6.7
April 2019 general election	28 Apr 2019	—N/a	14.0	23.5		15.2	–	–		9.0	10.0	—N/a	21.6	8.3
CIS	21 Mar–23 Apr 2019	892	13.6	19.4	5.0	4.5	2.0	1.5	1.9	2.2	–	40.4	7.0	5.8
2016 general election	26 Jun 2016	—N/a	24.7	17.1		11.2		–		0.2	13.6	—N/a	27.2	7.6
2015 general election	20 Dec 2015	—N/a	22.5	16.5	13.3	12.4			4.4	0.2	–	—N/a	24.5	6.0
2015 regional election	24 May 2015	—N/a	18.5	14.4	13.8	6.3	4.6	3.1	2.8	–	–	—N/a	31.7	4.1

== Results ==
=== Overall ===
← Summary of the 26 May 2019 Cortes of Aragon election results →
Parties and alliances	Popular vote			Seats	
Parties and alliances	Votes	%	±pp	Total	+/−
Spanish Socialist Workers' Party (PSOE)	206,400	30.84	+9.41	24	+6
People's Party (PP)	139,660	20.87	−6.63	16	−5
Citizens–Party of the Citizenry (Cs)	111,602	16.67	+7.25	12	+7
We Can–Equo (Podemos–Equo)^{1}	54,252	8.11	−12.64	5	−9
Aragonese Union (CHA)	41,879	6.26	+1.68	3	+1
Vox (Vox)	40,671	6.08	New	3	+3
Aragonese Party (PAR)	33,978	5.08	−1.78	3	−3
United Left of Aragon (IU)	22,229	3.32	−0.90	1	±0
Animalist Party Against Mistreatment of Animals (PACMA)	4,543	0.68	−0.06	0	±0
Ñ Platform (PAÑ)	3,145	0.47	New	0	±0
Blank Seats (EB)	1,483	0.22	−0.58	0	±0
Federation of Independents of Aragon (FIA)	821	0.12	+0.02	0	±0
Upper Aragon in Common (AAeC)	728	0.11	New	0	±0
Communist Party of the Workers of Spain (PCTE)	564	0.08	New	0	±0
Social Aragonese Movement (MAS)	434	0.06	New	0	±0
Aragonese Land (TA)	364	0.05	New	0	±0
Blank ballots	6,587	0.98	−1.00		
Total	669,340			67	±0
Valid votes	669,340	99.33	+0.63		
Invalid votes	4,540	0.67	−0.63		
Votes cast / turnout	673,880	66.16	−0.17		
Abstentions	344,650	33.84	+0.17		
Registered voters	1,018,530				
Sources
Footnotes: ^{1} We Can–Equo results are compared to the combined totals of We Can and Equo in the 2015 election.

Popular vote
PSOE	30.84%
PP	20.87%
Cs	16.67%
Podemos–Equo	8.11%
CHA	6.26%
Vox	6.08%
PAR	5.08%
IU	3.32%
Others	1.81%
Blank ballots	0.98%

Seats
PSOE	35.82%
PP	23.88%
Cs	17.91%
Podemos–Equo	7.46%
CHA	4.48%
Vox	4.48%
PAR	4.48%
IU	1.49%

=== Distribution by constituency ===
Constituency	PSOE		PP		Cs		Podemos		CHA		Vox		PAR		IU	
Constituency	%	S	%	S	%	S	%	S	%	S	%	S	%	S	%	S
Huesca	33.7	7	21.0	4	13.9	3	8.3	1	4.6	1	5.3	1	7.9	1	2.4	−
Teruel	31.5	6	24.1	4	13.7	2	5.9	1	4.6	−	4.8	−	10.4	1	3.1	−
Zaragoza	30.1	11	20.3	8	17.8	7	8.4	3	6.9	2	6.5	2	3.6	1	3.6	1
Total	30.8	24	20.9	16	16.7	12	8.1	5	6.3	3	6.1	3	5.1	3	3.3	1

== Aftermath ==
=== Government formation ===
Investiture; Nomination of Javier Lambán (PSOE)
Ballot →	31 July 2019
Required majority →	34 out of 67
Yes: • PSOE (24); • Podemos (5); • CHA (3); • PAR (3); • IU (1)	36 / 67
No: • PP (16); • Cs (12); • Vox (3)	31 / 67
Abstentions	0 / 67
Absentees	0 / 67

== Bibliography ==
- Ley Orgánica 5/1985, de 19 de junio, del Régimen Electoral General (Organic Law 5/1985). Official State Gazette (in Spanish). 19 June 1985 [version as of 6 March 2019]. BOE-A-1985-11672.
- Ley 2/1987, de 16 de febrero, Electoral de la Comunidad Autónoma de Aragón (Law 2/1987). Official State Gazette (in Spanish). 16 February 1987 [version as of 1 April 2019]. BOE-A-1987-5339.
- Ley Orgánica 5/2007, de 20 de abril, de reforma del Estatuto de Autonomía de Aragón (Organic Law 5/2007). Official State Gazette (in Spanish). 20 April 2007 [version as of 19 July 2011]. BOE-A-2007-8444.
- Ley 2/2009, de 11 de mayo, del Presidente y del Gobierno de Aragón (Law 2/2009). Official State Gazette (in Spanish). 11 May 2009 [version as of 11 January 2019]. BOE-A-2009-9390.
- Decreto de 1 de abril de 2019, del Presidente de Aragón, por el que se convocan elecciones a las Cortes de Aragón (Decree). Official Gazette of Aragon (in Spanish). 1 April 2019. BOA20190402001.
