= Mayte Pérez =

Spanish politician (born 1972)

Member of the Senate
- Incumbent
- Assumed office 28 March 2025
- Appointed by: Cortes of Aragon

Personal details
- Born: 14 May 1972 (age 53)
- Party: Spanish Socialist Workers' Party

María Teresa Pérez Esteban (born 14 May 1972), better known as Mayte Pérez, is a Spanish politician serving as a member of the Senate since 2025. From 2019 to 2023, she served as minister of the presidency and institutional relations and as government spokesperson of Aragon. From 2015 to 2019, she served as minister of education, culture and sports of Aragon.
