= José Luis Soro =

Spanish politician

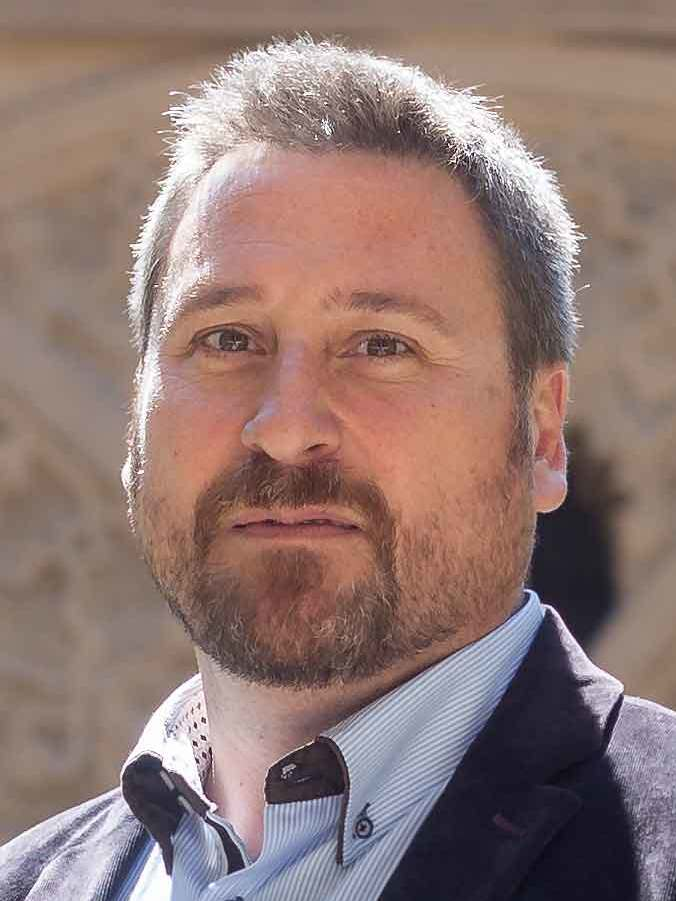

Regional Minister of Territorial Planning, Mobility and Housing of Aragon
- In office 6 July 2015 – 11 August 2023
- President: Javier Lambán
- Preceded by: Rafael Fernández de Alarcón (Public Works, Urbanism, Housing and Transport); Antonio Suárez Oriz (Territorial Policy and Interior)
- Succeeded by: Octavio López Rodriguez (Development, Housing, Mobility and Logistics)

President of Chunta Aragonesista
- In office 10 February 2012 – 8 February 2020
- Preceded by: Nieves Ibeas
- Succeeded by: Joaquín Palacín

Personal details
- Born: José Luis Soro Domingo; 17 December 1966 (age 59) Zaragoza, Spain
- Party: CHA

José Luis Soro Domingo (born 17 December 1966) is a Spanish politician from Chunta Aragonesista who served as Regional Minister of Territorial Planning, Mobility and Housing from July 2015 to August 2023. He was the president of CHA from February 2012 to February 2020.
