= Arturo Aliaga =

Spanish politician (born 1955)

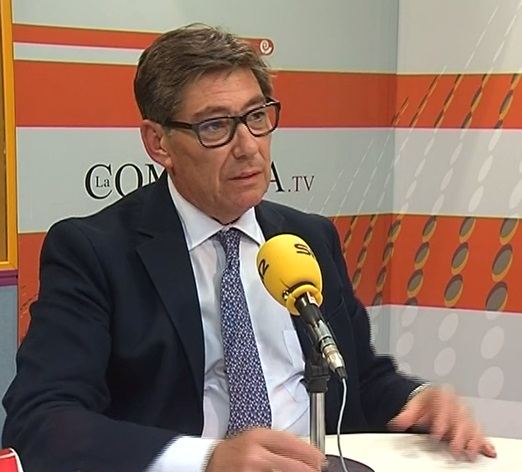

Vice President of the Government of Aragon
- In office 7 August 2019 – 10 August 2023
- President: Javier Lambán
- Preceded by: None

Regional Minister of Industry, Competitiveness and Business Development of Aragon
- In office 7 August 2019 – 10 August 2023
- President: Javier Lambán
- Preceded by: José Ángel Biel

President of the Aragonese Party
- Incumbent
- Assumed office 6 June 2015
- Preceded by: José Ángel Biel

Personal details
- Born: José Arturo Aliaga López; 12 October 1955 (age 70) Jaulín, Aragon, Spain
- Party: PAR

José Arturo Aliaga López (born 12 October 1955) is a Spanish politician from the Aragonese Party (PAR) who serves as the Vice President of the Government of Aragon and Regional Minister of Industry, Competitiveness and Business Development since August 2019. He has been the president of the PAR since June 2015.

Industrial engineer by profession, he was a professor at the School of Engineering of Huesca until his admission to the Corps of Senior Officials of the Administration of the Autonomous Community Aragon in 1987.
