= Aragonese nationalism =

Political movement in Spain

Estrelada aragonesa, flag and main symbol of left-wing Aragonese nationalism

Aragonese nationalism (Aragonese: Aragonesismo) is a political movement that seeks greater regional autonomy from the Spanish State for Aragon, and even its independence. Its principles are based on the idea that Aragon is a historical nation having been a kingdom in its own right, with its history, monarchs, laws, currency, language and culture.

== Political parties and organizations ==
There are several political parties and organisations self-defined as nationalist or regionalist in Aragon:

- Chunta Aragonesista (CHA), left-wing nationalist political party.
- Puyalón de Cuchas, left-wing separatist political party.
- Aragonese Party (PAR), right-wing regionalist political party.
  - Young Aragonese-Rolde, youth-wing of PAR.
- Aragonese State (EA), left-wing nationalist political party.
- Aragonese Workers' Union (SOA-STA), left-wing nationalist trade union.
- A Enrestida , left-wing nationalist political party.

Former parties and organisations include:

- Compromiso con Aragón, moderate regionalist political party from 2011 to 2018, before integrating into Citizens.
- Chobenalla Aragonesista, former youth wing of CHA until internal disputes led to its expulsion in 2008, its re-establishment in 2009 and final dissolution in 2010 when it merged into Purna.
- Cuchas Independence Bloc (BIC), a pro-independence political coalition from 2007 to 2016.
- Astral, former youth wing of EA that disassociated in 2009. Merged into Purna in 2010.
- Purna, left-wing nationalist communist youth organisation. It voted in April 2025 at its 9th National Assembly to dissolve and integrate into Socialist Youth Coordinator.

== See also ==
- Nationalisms and regionalisms of Spain
