= Chunta Aragonesista =

Aragonese Union Chunta Aragonesista
- President: Jorge Pueyo
- Secretary-General: Isabel Lasobras
- Founded: 29 June 1986
- Headquarters: Calle Conde de Aranda 14-16, 1º 50003 Zaragoza, Aragon
- Youth wing: Chobentú Aragonesista
- Ideology: Aragonese nationalism Eco-socialism; Left-wing nationalism Republicanism; Federalism
- Political position: Left-wing
- National affiliation: Sumar (since 2023); Broad Front (since 2026); Senate of Progress (since 2026) (Note: In the Senate) (Note: The party was formerly part of the IP (1987–1989), IP (1989–1994), LV–IP (1999–2004), EdP (2004–2009), EdP–V (2011–2015), Plural Left (2011–2015), European Spring (2014–2019), Popular Unity (2015–2016), and Commitment to Europe (2019–2020))
- European affiliation: European Free Alliance
- Colours: Yellow, Red, Black (since February 2009)
- Congress of Deputies (Aragonese seats): 0 / 13
- Senate: 0 / 266
- European Parliament: 0 / 61
- Aragonese Corts: 6 / 67
- Provincial deputations: 2 / 77
- Mayors: 23 / 713
- Town councillors: 131 / 4,155

Website
- chunta.org

The Chunta Aragonesista (CHA; English: Aragonese Union) is a political party in Aragon (Spain), influenced by eco-socialism and Aragonese nationalism. CHA defends a federal state, greater financial resources for Aragon, and the protection of the environment and hydrological resources of the Ebro Valley. It promotes the use of the Aragonese language.

== History ==
CHA was founded on 29 June 1986.

In the 2000 and 2004 general elections, CHA won 0.4% of the vote and one seat for José Antonio Labordeta, a folk singer in the Zaragoza constituency. It lost the seat in 2008 after Labordeta retired from the congress. In the 2011 election, it regained the seat as part of an electoral alliance with United Left.

== Ideology ==
The CHA has been described as Aragonese nationalist and eco-socialist. In 2005, the party campaigned against the ratification of the European Constitution.

== Organization ==
=== Symbols ===
Logo from 1986 to 1989

Logo from 1989 to February 2009

=== Structure ===
The National Assembly is the highest organ of representation and decision of the Chunta. It establishes political policies, programs and principles, and chooses the members of the Mayan of Lawsuits, to those of the National Committee and to the president of CHA.

=== Alliances ===
CHA contested the 2023 Spanish general election as a member of the Sumar coalition. The party has allied itself with other progressive parties such as Compromís and Equo. For the European Parliament elections, CHA has taken part in many nationwide coalitions such as the Europe of the Peoples or European Spring.

=== International affiliation ===
Chunta Aragonesista was a member of the European Free Alliance (EFA) until 2018. CHA rejoined EFA in 2025.

== Electoral performance ==
=== Cortes of Aragon ===
Cortes of Aragon
Election	Leading candidate	Votes	%	Seats	Gov.
1987	Eduardo Vicente	6,154	1.0 (#8)	0 / 67	—
1991	Chus Beltrán	14,116	2.3 (#6)	0 / 67	—
1995	Chesús Bernal	34,077	4.8 (#5)	2 / 67	No
1999	Chesús Bernal	72,101	11.0 (#4)	5 / 67	No
2003	Chesús Bernal	97,763	13.7 (#3)	9 / 67	No
2007	Chesús Bernal	54,752	8.1 (#4)	4 / 67	No
2011	Nieves Ibeas	55,932	8.2 (#4)	4 / 67	No
2015	José Luis Soro	30,618	4.6 (#6)	2 / 67	Yes
2019	José Luis Soro	41,879	6.3 (#5)	3 / 67	Yes
2023	José Luis Soro	34,163	5.1 (#4)	3 / 67	No
2026	Jorge Pueyo	65,118	9.7 (#4)	6 / 67	No

=== Cortes Generales ===
Cortes Generales
Election	Aragon						
Election	Congress					Senate	
Election	Vote	%	Score	Seats	+/–	Seats	+/–
1989	3,156	0.48	9th	0 / 13	New	0 / 12	New
1993	6,344	0.83	6th	0 / 13	0	0 / 12	0
1996	49,739	6.42	4th	0 / 13	0	0 / 12	0
2000	75,356	10.42	3rd	1 / 13	1	0 / 12	0
2004	94,252	12.07	3rd	1 / 13	0	0 / 12	0
2008	37,995	4.99	4th	0 / 13	1	0 / 12	0
2011	Within Plural Left			1 / 13	1	0 / 12	0
2015	Within Popular Unity			0 / 13	1	0 / 12	0
2019 (Nov)	23,196 (Note: Within More Country–Aragonese Union–Equo)	4.52	6th	0 / 13	0	0 / 12	0
2023	Within Sumar			1 / 13	1	0 / 12	0

=== European Parliament ===
European Parliament
Election	Total					Aragon		
Election	Votes	%	#	Seats	+/–	Votes	%	#
1987	Within IP			0 / 60	—	3,955	0.62	9th
1989	Within IP			0 / 60	0	8,563	1.70	7th
1999	Within LV–IP			0 / 64	0	44,494	6.85	4th
2004	Within EdP			0 / 54	0	29,520	6.13	3rd
2009	Within EdP–V			0 / 54	0	13,259	2.84	5th
2014	Within PE			0 / 54	0	20,625	4.49	6th
2019	Within CpE			0 / 59	0	13,234	2.00	6th
2024	Within Sumar			0 / 61	0	26,683	5.10	4th
