= Javier Lambán =

Spanish politician (1957–2025)

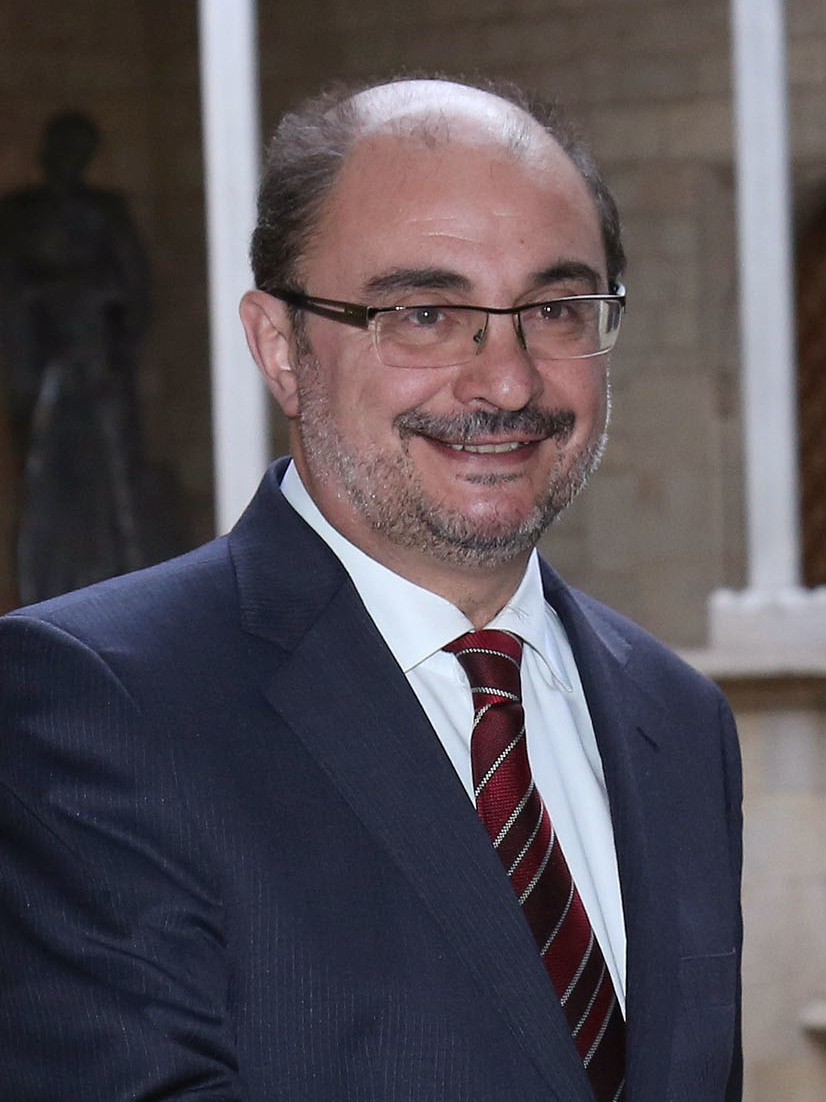
- Lambán in 2016

President of Aragon
- In office 5 July 2015 – 11 August 2023
- Preceded by: Luisa Fernanda Rudi
- Succeeded by: Jorge Azcón

Secretary-General of the Socialist Workers' Party of Aragón
- In office 31 March 2012 – 16 March 2025
- Preceded by: Marcelino Iglesias
- Succeeded by: Pilar Alegría

Mayor of Ejea de los Caballeros
- In office 11 June 2007 – 15 July 2014
- Preceded by: Eduardo Alonso Lizondo
- Succeeded by: Teresa Ladrero

President of Provincial Deputation of Zaragoza
- In office 4 August 1999 – 22 June 2011
- Preceded by: José Ignacio Senao
- Succeeded by: Luis María Beamonte

Member of the Senate
- In office 6 September 2023 – 30 January 2025
- Constituency: Cortes of Aragon

Member of the Cortes of Aragon
- In office 21 June 2011 – 6 September 2023
- Constituency: Zaragoza

Personal details
- Born: Francisco Javier Lambán Montañés; 19 August 1957 Ejea de los Caballeros, Spain
- Died: 15 August 2025 (aged 67) Ejea de los Caballeros, Spain
- Party: PSOE–Aragón

Francisco Javier Lambán Montañés (Spanish: [fɾanˈθisko xaˈβjeɾ lamˈban montaˈɲes]; 19 August 1957 – 15 August 2025) was a Spanish politician who was a member of the Spanish Socialist Workers' Party (PSOE) and served as President of the Government of Aragon from 5 July 2015 to 11 August 2023.

== Life and career ==
Born on 19 August 1957 in Ejea de los Caballeros, he graduated in history at the University of Barcelona. A member of the Ejea city council from 1983 (he also joined the PSOE that year), he was a member of the provincial deputation between 1991 and 2012. He was elected President of the Provincial Deputation of Zaragoza on 15 July 1999. He became the Mayor of Ejea in 2007.

A member of the Aragonese regional legislature, the Cortes of Aragon, from 2011, he obtained a PhD in history at the University of Zaragoza in 2014, reading a thesis titled La reforma agraria en Aragón, 1931-1936.

Voted President of the Government of Aragon by the regional legislature after the 2015 election, Lambán was sworn into office on 5 July 2015 at the Aljafería Palace. He lost the re-election in the 2023 Aragonese regional election, and was succeeded by Jorge Azcón.

He was an open and strong critic of Pedro Sánchez.

Lambán died on 15 August 2025, at the age of 67, from the colon cancer he had been suffering since 2021.

On 7 October 2025, the Council of Ministers posthumously awarded him the Grand Cross of the Order of Charles III.
