= María Navarro =

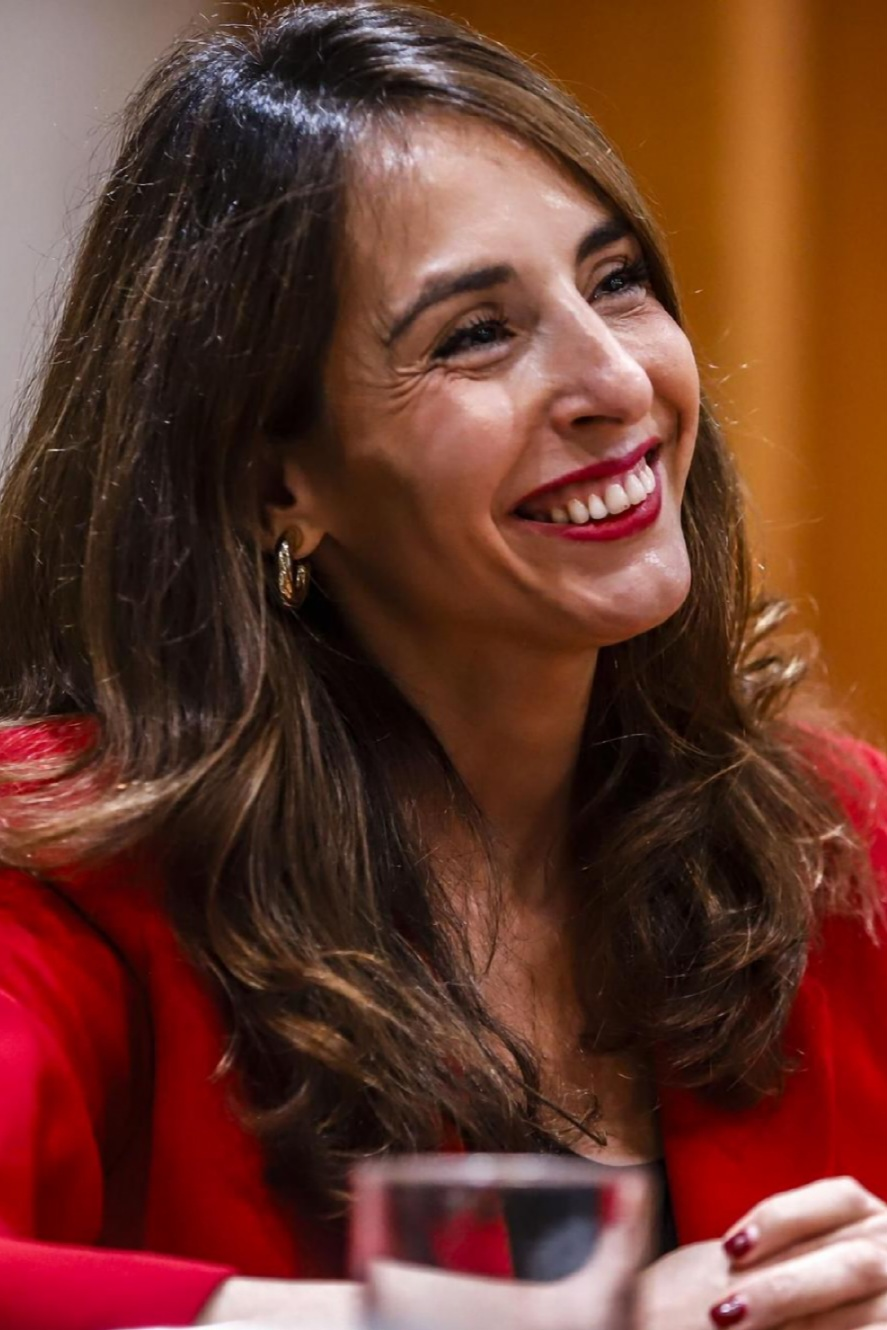

President of the Cortes of Aragon
- Incumbent
- Assumed office 3 March 2026
- Preceded by: Marta Fernández Martín

Member of the Cortes of Aragon
- Incumbent
- Assumed office 20 June 2023
- Constituency: Zaragoza

Personal details
- Born: María Navarro Viscasillas; 12 April 1984 (age 42) Zaragoza, Spain
- Party: People's Party
- Children: 3
- Education: University of Zaragoza

María Navarro Viscasillas (born 12 March 1984) is a Spanish politician of the People's Party (PP). She was a member of the Senate of Spain (2013–2015) and Zaragoza City Council (2015–2023). Elected to the Cortes of Aragon in 2023, she became the legislature's president (speaker) in 2026.

== Biography ==
Born in Zaragoza, Navarro graduated with a law degree from the University of Zaragoza, and has a master's degree in city planning from the IESE Business School. She is a member of the Royal and Illustrious College of Lawyers in Zaragoza, specialising in public law. She is married and has three daughters, as of 2026.

Navarro joined the People's Party (PP) in 2004. In September 2013, following the death of José Atarés, she was sworn into the Senate of Spain. She was elected to Zaragoza City Council in 2015, and when Jorge Azcón became mayor in 2019, she became the party spokesperson, having run second on the PP list.

When Azcón ran for President of the Government of Aragon in the 2023 regional election, Navarro was in fourth on the PP list in the Zaragoza constituency. The party took 15 seats in the constituency and 28 overall, becoming the largest group in the Cortes of Aragon.

After Vox left Azcón's government and voted against his budget plans, a snap election was called for February 2026. Navarro remained fourth on the party list in Zaragoza. Her party retained first place, losing two seats. On 3 March 2026, she was elected president of the Cortes of Aragon, the position of speaker. She received the 26 votes of her party, while Fernando Sabes of the Spanish Socialist Workers' Party (PSOE) received 25 from his party (18), Chunta Aragonesista (6) and the United Left (1); Vox (14) and Teruel Existe (2) abstained. She was the second president from the PP, after Ángel Cristóbal (1991–1995).
