= Government of Jorge Azcón =

Government of Jorge Azcón may refer to:

- First government of Jorge Azcón (2023–2026)
- Second government of Jorge Azcón (2026–present)
