= Azcón =

Azcón is a Spanish surname. Notable people with the surname include:

- Jorge Azcón (born 1973), Spanish politician, son of Julio Azcón
- Julio Azcón (1931–2022), Spanish footballer, father of Jorge Azcón
