= Second government of Jorge Azcón =

Government of Jorge Azcón
- Government of Aragon
- 2026–present
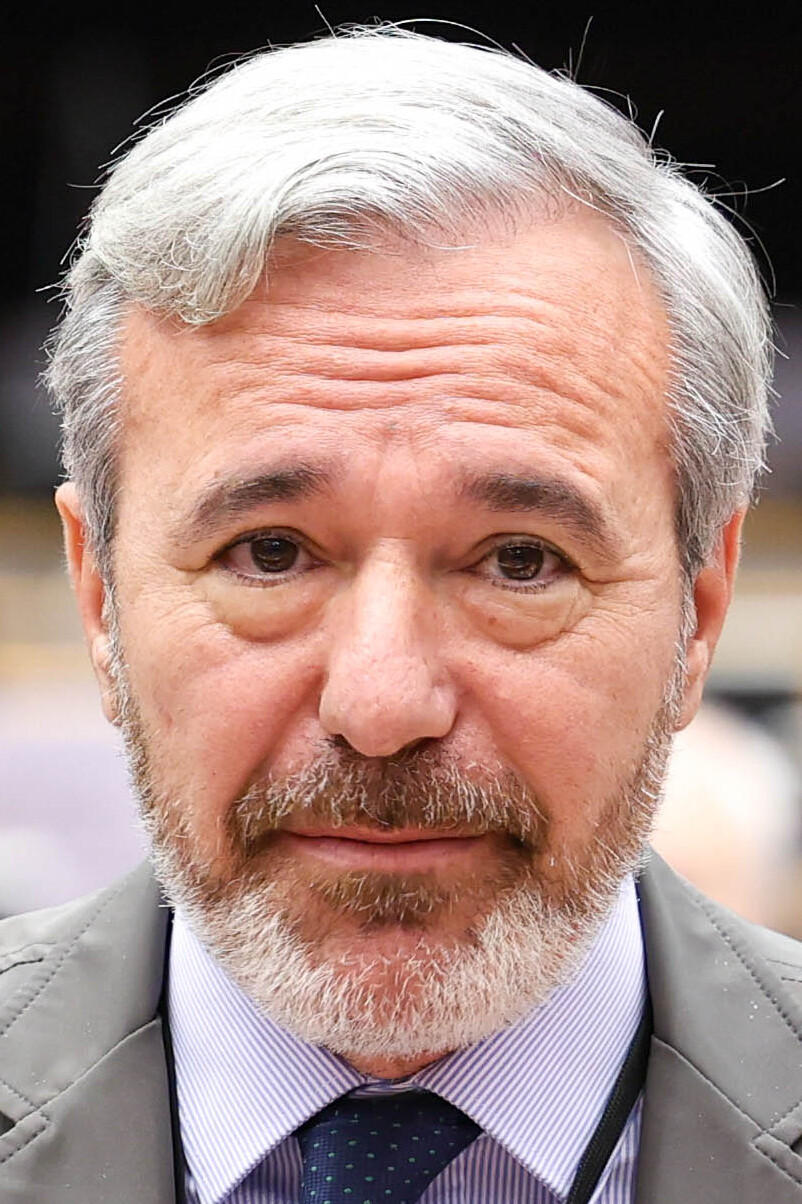
- Jorge Azcón in October 2025.
- Date formed: 4 May 2026

People and organisations
- Monarch: Felipe VI
- President: Jorge Azcón
- Vice Presidents: Alejandro Nolasco, Mar Vaquero
- No. of ministers: 9 (Note: Does not include the President.)
- Member party: PP; Vox
- Status in legislature: Majority (coalition)
- Opposition party: PSOE
- Opposition leader: Pilar Alegría

History
- Election: 2026 regional election
- Legislature term: 12th Cortes
- Predecessor: Azcón I

The second government of Jorge Azcón was formed on 4 May 2026, following the latter's election as President of the Government of Aragon by the Cortes of Aragon on 29 April and his swearing-in on 30 April, as a result of the People's Party (PP) and Vox being able to muster a majority of seats in the Cortes following the 2026 regional election. It succeeded the first Azcón government and is the incumbent Government of Aragon since 4 May 2026, a total of 63 days.

The cabinet comprises members of the PP and Vox.

== Investiture ==
Investiture; Nomination of Jorge Azcón (PP)
Ballot →	29 April 2026
Required majority →	34 out of 67
Yes: • PP (26); • Vox (13)	39 / 67
No: • PSOE (18); • CHA (6); • Existe (2); • IU (1)	27 / 67
Abstentions	0 / 67
Absentees: • Vox (1)	1 / 67

== Council of Government ==
The Council of Government is structured into the offices for the president, the two vice presidents, nine ministries and the post of spokesperson of the Government.

← Azcón II Government → (4 May 2026 – present)
Portfolio	Name	Party	Took office	Left office	Ref.
President	Jorge Azcón	PP	30 April 2026	Incumbent	
Vice President; Minister of Deregulation, Social Welfare and Family Affairs	Alejandro Nolasco	Vox	4 May 2026	Incumbent	
Vice President; Minister of the Presidency, Justice and Culture; Spokesperson of the Government	Mar Vaquero	PP	4 May 2026	Incumbent	
Minister of Finance, Interior and Public Administration	Roberto Bermúdez de Castro	PP	4 May 2026	Incumbent	
Minister of Housing, Development, Logistics and Territorial Cohesion	Octavio López	PP	4 May 2026	Incumbent	
Minister of Economy, Competitiveness and Employment	Eva Valle	Independent	4 May 2026	Incumbent	
Minister of Agriculture, Livestock and Food	Aránzazu Simón	Vox	4 May 2026	Incumbent	
Minister of Environment and Tourism	Luis Biendicho	Vox	4 May 2026	Incumbent	
Minister of Health	Ángel Sanz Barea	Independent	4 May 2026	Incumbent	
Minister of Education, Science and Universities	Carmen María Susín	PP	4 May 2026	Incumbent	

== Notes ==
Preceded by Azcón I	Government of Aragon; 2026–present	Incumbent
