= 2027 Zaragoza municipal election =

Election in the Spanish municipality of Zaragoza

- 23 May 2027

All 31 seats in the City Council of Zaragoza 16 seats needed for a majority
- Opinion polls
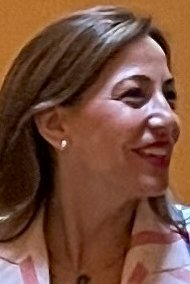

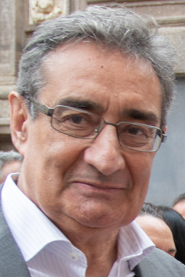

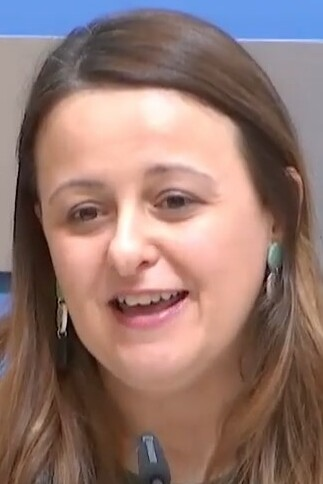
Leader	Natalia Chueca	Lola Ranera	Julio Calvo
Party	PP	PSOE	Vox
Leader since	10 January 2023	19 February 2020	22 April 2019
Last election	15 seats, 37.9%	10 seats, 26.4%	4 seats, 12.4%
Current seats	15	10	4
Seats needed	▲1	▲6	▲12
Leader	Elena Tomás
Party	ZGZ/ZeC
Leader since	19 December 2022
Last election	2 seats, 5.8%
Current seats	2
Seats needed	▲14
Incumbent Mayor
Natalia Chueca
PP

A municipal election will be held in Zaragoza on 23 May 2027 to elect the 13th City Council of the municipality. All 31 seats in the City Council will be up for election. It will be held concurrently with regional elections in at least seven autonomous communities and local elections all across Spain.

== Overview ==
Under the 1978 Constitution, the governance of municipalities in Spain—part of the country's local government system—is centered on the figure of city councils (Spanish: ayuntamientos), local corporations with independent legal personality composed of a mayor, a government council and an elected legislative assembly. The mayor is indirectly elected by the local assembly, requiring an absolute majority; otherwise, the candidate from the most-voted party automatically becomes mayor (ties are resolved by drawing lots). In the case of Zaragoza, the top-tier administrative and governing body is the City Council of Zaragoza.

=== Date ===
The term of local assemblies in Spain expires four years after the date of their previous election, with election day being fixed for the fourth Sunday of May every four years (as of 2026, this has been the year before a leap year). The election decree shall be issued no later than 54 days before the scheduled election date and published on the following day in the Official State Gazette (BOE). The previous local elections were held on 28 May 2023, setting the date for election day on the fourth Sunday of May four years later, which is 23 May 2027.

Local assemblies can not be dissolved before the expiration of their term, except in cases of mismanagement that seriously harm the public interest and imply a breach of constitutional obligations, in which case the Council of Ministers can—optionally—decide to call a by-election.

=== Electoral system ===
Voting for local assemblies is based on universal suffrage, comprising all Spanish nationals over 18 years of age, registered and residing in the municipality and with full political rights (provided that they have not been deprived of the right to vote by a final sentence), as well as resident non-national European citizens, and those whose country of origin allow reciprocal voting by virtue of a treaty.

Local councillors are elected using the D'Hondt method and closed-list proportional voting, with a five percent-threshold of valid votes (including blank ballots) in each municipality. Each municipality is a multi-member constituency, with a number of seats based on the following scale:

Population	Councillors
<100	3
101–250	5
251–1,000	7
1,001–2,000	9
2,001–5,000	11
5,001–10,000	13
10,001–20,000	17
20,001–50,000	21
50,001–100,000	25
>100,001	+1 per each 100,000 inhabitants or fraction +1 if total is an even number

The law does not provide for by-elections to fill vacant seats; instead, any vacancies arising after the proclamation of candidates and during the legislative term will be filled by the next candidates on the party lists or, when required, by designated substitutes.

=== Current council ===
The table below shows the composition of the political groups in the local assembly at the present time.

Current council composition
Groups	Parties	Councillors	
Groups	Parties	Seats	Total
People's Municipal Group	PP	15	15
Socialist Municipal Group	PSOE	10	10
Vox Municipal Group	Vox	4	4
Zaragoza in Common Municipal Group	IU	2	2

== Parties and candidates ==
The electoral law allows for parties and federations registered in the interior ministry, alliances and groupings of electors to present lists of candidates. Parties and federations intending to form an alliance are required to inform the relevant electoral commission within 10 days of the election call, whereas groupings of electors need to secure the signature of a determined amount of the electors registered in the municipality for which they seek election, disallowing electors from signing for more than one list. In the case of Zaragoza, as its population is between 300,001 and 1,000,000, at least 5,000 signatures are required. Amendments in 2024 required a balanced composition of men and women in the electoral lists through the use of a zipper system.

Below is a list of the main parties and alliances which will likely contest the election:

Candidacy	Parties and alliances	Leading candidate	Ideology	Previous result		Gov.	Ref.
Candidacy	Parties and alliances	Leading candidate	Ideology	Vote %	Seats	Gov.	Ref.
PP	List: People's Party (PP)	Natalia Chueca	Conservatism; Christian democracy	37.9%	15	Yes	
PSOE	List: Spanish Socialist Workers' Party (PSOE)	Lola Ranera	Social democracy	26.4%	10	No	
Vox	List: Vox (Vox)	Julio Calvo	Right-wing populism Ultranationalism; National conservatism	12.4%	4	No	
ZGZ/ZeC	List: United Left of Aragon (IU) – Communist Party of Aragon (PCE–A) – The Dawn Marxist Organization (La Aurora (OM)) – Republican Left (IR)	Elena Tomás	Localism; Left-wing populism Participatory democracy	5.8%	2	No	

== Opinion polls ==
The tables below list opinion polling results in reverse chronological order, showing the most recent first and using the dates when the survey fieldwork was done, as opposed to the date of publication. Where the fieldwork dates are unknown, the date of publication is given instead. The highest percentage figure in each polling survey is displayed with its background shaded in the leading party's colour. If a tie ensues, this is applied to the figures with the highest percentages. The "Lead" column on the right shows the percentage-point difference between the parties with the highest percentages in a poll.

=== Voting intention estimates ===
The table below lists weighted voting intention estimates. Refusals are generally excluded from the party vote percentages, while question wording and the treatment of "don't know" responses and those not intending to vote may vary between polling organisations. When available, seat projections determined by the polling organisations are displayed below (or in place of) the percentages in a smaller font; 16 seats are required for an absolute majority in the City Council of Zaragoza.

Polling firm/Commissioner	Fieldwork date	Sample size	Turnout	PP	PSOE	Vox	ZGZ/ZeC	CHA	Podemos	PAR	Sumar	Existe	SALF	Lead
A+M/Heraldo de Aragón	1–6 Oct 2026	1,000	68.0	34.2; 13	24.3; 9	18.5; 7	4.9; 0	12.1; 4	–	–	–	2.8; 0	–	9.9
SocioMétrica/El Español	28 Sep–2 Oct 2026	1,100	?	40.5; 16/17	22.7; 8/9	12.9; 4/5	3.9; 0	7.0; 2/3	1.9; 0	0.9; 0	2.5; 0	3.2; 0	–	17.8
2026 regional election	8 Feb 2026	—N/a	68.9	36.3 (13)	23.2 (8)	16.0 (6)	(Note: Within Sumar.)	11.3 (4)	1.1 (0)	0.7 (0)	3.6 (0)	2.5 (0)	2.8 (0)	13.1
SocioMétrica/El Español	29 Sep–3 Oct 2025	1,013	?	40.3; 15/16	24.2; 8/9	15.3; 5/6	5.1; 1/2	–	–	–	–	–	–	16.1
Sigma Dos/PP	15–30 Jun 2025	?	?	44.4; 15/16	26.0; 8/9	? 3	8.4; 2/3	–	–	–	–	–	–	18.4
A+M/Heraldo de Aragón	2–10 Apr 2025	800	67.0	42.9; 16	30.9; 11	10.9; 4	4.1; 0	4.7; 0	2.7; 0	–	–	–	–	12.0
SocioMétrica/El Español	1–6 Oct 2024	900	?	41.7; 16	27.0; 11	11.6; 4	4.0; 0	4.0; 0	2.2; 0	0.6; 0	4.5; 0	2.0; 0	–	14.7
2024 EP election	9 Jun 2024	—N/a	54.2	37.0 (13)	29.5 (11)	11.1 (4)			3.7 (0)	–	5.9 (2)	2.2 (0)	5.2 (1)	7.5
A+M/Heraldo de Aragón	10–15 Apr 2024	800	67.3	39.4; 14	32.1; 12	13.6; 5	4.0; 0	4.9; 0	2.1; 0	–	–	–	–	7.3
2023 general election	23 Jul 2023	—N/a	72.5	36.1 (12)	30.2 (10)	14.6 (5)				0.5 (0)	14.6 (4)	1.6 (0)	–	5.9
2023 municipal election	28 May 2023	—N/a	66.6	37.9; 15	26.4; 10	12.4; 4	5.8; 2	4.7; 0	4.5; 0	0.9; 0	–	–	–	11.5

=== Voting preferences ===
The table below lists raw, unweighted voting preferences.

Polling firm/Commissioner	Fieldwork date	Sample size	PP	PSOE	Vox	ZGZ/ZeC	CHA	Podemos	PAR	Sumar	Existe	SALF	Question	X mark	Lead
Fundación DFA/City Council	17 Jun–17 Jul 2026	2,025	23.2	10.6	10.0	2.6	4.4	–	0.2	–	–	1.1	–	–	12.6
Fundación DFA/City Council	8 Jan–5 Feb 2026	2,025	20.3	9.5	9.3	2.6	3.0	0.8	0.1	–	–	–	40.0	7.6	10.8
Fundación DFA/City Council	14 Jul–8 Aug 2025	2,025	20.2	9.3	8.8	3.2	1.4	0.6	0.4	–	–	–	39.7	9.4	10.9
Fundación DFA/City Council	10 Jun–3 Jul 2024	2,025	22.8	12.5	5.1	2.2	0.7	1.2	0.1	–	–	–	41.3	8.0	10.3
2024 EP election (Note: Does not include non-resident citizens.)	9 Jun 2024	—N/a	20.0	15.9	6.0			2.0	–	3.2	1.2	2.8	—N/a	45.8	4.1
Fundación DFA/City Council	16 Nov–23 Dec 2023	2,025	24.7	13.5	5.5	3.4	0.9	0.3	0.2	–	–	–	37.9	7.8	11.2
2023 general election	23 Jul 2023	—N/a	25.9	21.7	10.5				0.4	10.5	1.1	–	—N/a	27.5	4.2
2023 municipal election	28 May 2023	—N/a	25.0	17.4	8.2	3.8	3.1	3.0	0.6	–	–	–	—N/a	33.4	7.6

=== Preferred Mayor ===
The table below lists opinion polling on leader preferences to become mayor of Zaragoza.

Polling firm/Commissioner	Fieldwork date	Sample size			Other/ None/ Not care	Question	Lead
Polling firm/Commissioner	Fieldwork date	Sample size	Chueca PP	Ranera PSOE	Other/ None/ Not care	Question	Lead
SocioMétrica/El Español	29 Sep–3 Oct 2025	1,013	47.5	30.8	–	21.7	16.7

=== Predicted Mayor ===
The table below lists opinion polling on the perceived likelihood for each leader to become mayor.

Polling firm/Commissioner	Fieldwork date	Sample size			Other/ None/ Not care	Question	Lead
Polling firm/Commissioner	Fieldwork date	Sample size	Chueca PP	Ranera PSOE	Other/ None/ Not care	Question	Lead
SocioMétrica/El Español	29 Sep–3 Oct 2025	1,013	52.5	?	–	–	?

== Bibliography ==
- Constitución Española (Constitution). Official State Gazette (in Spanish). 27 December 1978 [version as of 20 May 2026]. BOE-A-1978-31229.
- Ley 7/1985, de 2 de abril, Reguladora de las Bases del Régimen Local (Law 7/1985). Official State Gazette (in Spanish). 2 April 1985 [version as of 3 June 2026]. BOE-A-1985-5392.
- Ley Orgánica 5/1985, de 19 de junio, del Régimen Electoral General (Organic Law 5/1985). Official State Gazette (in Spanish). 19 June 1985 [version as of 2 July 2026]. BOE-A-1985-11672.
