= Alcaldes del cambio =

Alcaldes del cambio (Spanish for Mayors of change) is the name given to a group of local elected politicians after the 2015 municipal elections in Spain, following the 2008 financial crisis and the anti-austerity protests that formed the 15-M movement.

These mayors reached power by defeating the traditional parties of Spanish politics: the centre-left Spanish Socialist Workers' Party and mostly the conservative People's Party, who in cities such as Madrid, Valencia or Cádiz had been governing for over two decades. Most of their platforms were formed as municipalist-centered citizen movements supported by newer left-wing parties like Podemos or more established forces such as Izquierda Unida, as well as local grassroots organizations. Despite their anti-establishment rhetoric against the traditional two-party system (known as bipartidismo), most of them did not win outright majorities in their local assemblies and instead had to rely on parliamentary backing from other parties, particularly from the PSOE, to successfully oust the incumbent administrations.

Among their proposals, under the label of "new politics", they promised to fight against corruption and austerity, improving social policies such as housing or fighting child poverty, banning evictions or put a stop to real-estate bubble; green policies and advancing in direct democracy.

== Key policies ==
Ada Colau and Manuela Carmena, mayors of Barcelona and Madrid at the time, maintained a close relationship and promoted closer ties between both cities.

During their terms, these administrations implemented several structural changes in city management. Cities like Madrid, Barcelona, Cádiz or Zaragoza significantly reduced municipal public debt while increasing social spending. Barcelona and Valencia pioneered sustainable urban models, notably through the creation of Barcelona's Superblocks (Superilles) and the massive expansion of Valencia's bicycle lane infrastructure under Ribó. In Madrid, Carmena's administration promoted the so-called "renaturalización del Manzanares" (renaturalization), whilst Ribó in Valencia attempted to do the same within the old Turia river basin that crosses through the city. In Zaragoza, Santisteve increased the city council's spending in public housing and created superblocks following the Barcelona model.

Several cities attempted to remunicipalize public services, such as water supply, funeral services, or garbage collection, with varying degrees of administrative success, as well as the pedestrianization of their city centres.

== Controversies and criticisms ==
Despite their focus on social justice and transparency, these administrations faced significant opposition and polarization throughout their terms, including tourism and commercial friction, accusations of "alleged permissiveness" regarding unregulated street vending (known as manteros) and illegal housing squats (okupas) leading to intense media debates over public safety and urban order; intense backlash from motorist associations, transport lobbies and merchant unions over major infrastructure shifts such as the implementation of Madrid Central under Carmena or the massive expansion of bicycle lanes and pedestrian zones in Valencia, whose restrictions they claimed the restrictions harmed commerce; or the fact that these administrations operated under severe financial constraints imposed by the national government's Budgetary Stability Law of 2012 (popularly known as the Montoro Law), which forced municipalities to prioritize debt repayment over local investments. In late 2017, this led to a major political crisis within Madrid's government, culminating in Carmena dismissing her own economic councilor, Carlos Sánchez Mato, to avoid a direct intervention of the city's accounts by the national Ministry of Finance.

== List ==
Name	Party	City	Region	Population	Won from	Term
Manuela Carmena	Now Madrid (Ahora Madrid)	Madrid	Community of Madrid	3,416,771 (1st)	Ana Botella (PP)	13 June 2015 – 15 June 2019
Ada Colau	Barcelona in Common (Barcelona en Comú)	Barcelona	Catalonia	1,702,547 (2nd)	Xavier Trias (CDC)	13 June 2015 – 17 June 2023
Joan Ribó	Commitment (Compromís)	Valencia	Valencian Community	825,948 (3rd)	Rita Barberá (PP)	13 June 2015 – 17 June 2023
Pedro Santisteve	Zaragoza in Common (Zaragoza en Común)	Zaragoza	Aragon	686,986 (5th)	Juan Alberto Belloch (PSOE)	13 June 2015 – 15 June 2019
Xulio Ferreiro	Atlantic Tide (Marea Atlántica)	La Coruña	Galicia	249,255 (18th)	Carlos Negreira (PP)	13 June 2015 – 15 June 2019
Dolors Sabater	Let's win Badalona in Common (Guanyem Badalona en Comú)	Badalona	Catalonia	231,542 (22nd)	Xavier García Albiol (PP)	13 June 2015 – 20 June 2018
José María González Santos	We Can for Cádiz (Por Cádiz Sí Se Puede)	Cádiz	Andalusia	109,950 (60th)	Teófila Martínez (PP)	13 June 2015 – 17 June 2023
José María González Santos	Andalusia Forward (Adelante Andalucía)	Cádiz	Andalusia	109,950 (60th)	Teófila Martínez (PP)	13 June 2015 – 17 June 2023
Martiño Noriega	Open Compostela (Compostela Aberta)	Santiago de Compostela	Galicia	100,965 (66th)	Agustín Hernández Fernández (PP)	13 June 2015 – 15 June 2019
Jorge Suárez Fernández	Ferrol in Common (Ferrol en Común)	Ferrol	Galicia	64,358 (122nd)	José Manuel Rey Varela (PP)	13 June 2015 – 15 June 2019

== Decline and legacy ==
The "mayors of change" era faced a sharp decline starting in 2019 due to internal fragmentation within the left-wing coalitions (notably the split between Podemos and Más Madrid), intense media opposition and judicial challenges against municipal decrees, with heavy judicialization of municipal governance. Left-wing platforms frequently denounced what they described as a coordinated campaign of "lawfare".

Dozens of criminal complaints and lawsuits were filed against mayors and city councilors by investment funds, real-estate lobbies, and far-right legal organizations such as Manos Limpias. These lawsuits targeted municipal housing policies, green zone regulations and public service remunicipalization projects. While the vast majority of these criminal cases were ultimately archived and dismissed by Spanish judges due to a lack of evidence of wrongdoing, the constant legal challenges created significant administrative delays and sustained negative media coverage throughout their mandates.

In the 2019 municipal elections, platforms in Madrid, Zaragoza, Santiago, Ferrol and La Coruña lost power to right-wing coalitions. José María González "Kichi" in Cádiz, Ada Colau in Barcelona, and Joan Ribó in Valencia managed to secure second terms. However, González chose not to run again in 2023, and both Colau and Ribó lost their mayoralties following the May 2023 municipal elections, effectively bringing an end to the political phenomenon.

=== Legacy ===
In Madrid, Manuela Carmena pedestrianized the Gran Vía, implemented a low-emission zone (Madrid Central) and promoted a reform in the area surrounding the Temple of Debod, the Plaza de España square and Príncipe Pío along with the renaturalization of the Manzanares area known as Madrid Río and the decision to cover the new section of the city where the estadio Vicente Calderón instead of placing it underground. Despite initial opposition from his eventual successor José Luis Martínez-Almeida to most or all of these reforms, he decided to keep or modify some of them instead of scrapping them.

In Valencia, Ribó implemented many cycling lanes throughout the city, whilst his successor María José Catalá promised to dismantle.
