= 2023 Zaragoza municipal election =

Election in the Spanish municipality of Zaragoza

- 28 May 2023

All 31 seats in the City Council of Zaragoza 16 seats needed for a majority
- Opinion polls
- Registered: 503,743 ▼0.4%
- Turnout: 335,350 (66.6%) ▲0.8 pp
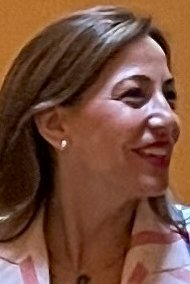

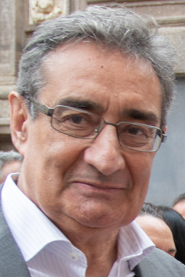

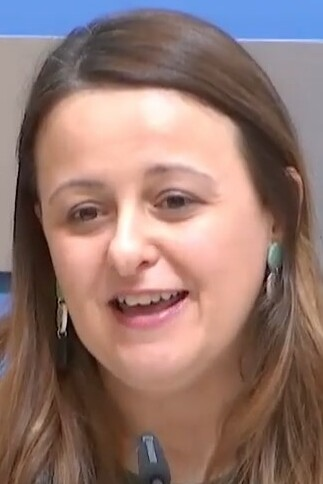

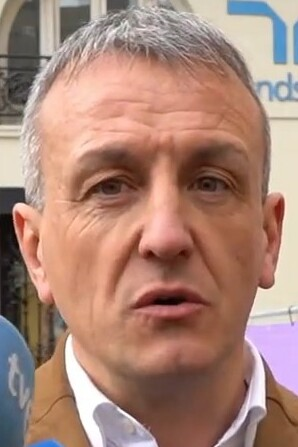

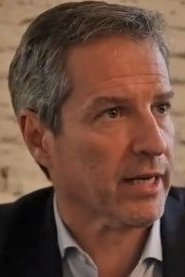
	First party	Second party	Third party
Leader	Natalia Chueca	Lola Ranera	Julio Calvo
Party	PP	PSOE	Vox
Leader since	10 January 2023	19 February 2020	22 April 2019
Last election	8 seats, 22.0%	10 seats, 28.0%	2 seats, 6.2%
Seats won	15	10	4
Seat change	▲7	0	▲2
Popular vote	125,751	87,790	41,061
Percentage	37.9%	26.4%	12.4%
Swing	▲15.9 pp	▼1.6 pp	▲6.2 pp
	Fourth party	Fifth party	Sixth party
Leader	Elena Tomás	Fernando Rivarés	Daniel Pérez Calvo
Party	ZGZ/ZeC	Podemos–AV	CS–Tú Aragón
Leader since	19 December 2022	15 July 2020	22 March 2023
Last election	3 seats, 10.1%	2 seats, 6.2%	6 seats, 18.3%
Seats won	2	0	0
Seat change	▼1	▼2	▼6
Popular vote	19,381	14,908	5,530
Percentage	5.8%	4.5%	1.7%
Swing	▼4.3 pp	▼1.7 pp	▼16.6 pp
Mayor before election
Jorge Azcón
PP
Mayor after election
Natalia Chueca
PP

A municipal election was held in Zaragoza on 28 May 2023 to elect the 12th City Council of the municipality. All 31 seats in the City Council were up for election. It was held concurrently with regional elections in twelve autonomous communities and local elections all across Spain.

== Overview ==
Under the 1978 Constitution, the governance of municipalities in Spain—part of the country's local government system—was centered on the figure of city councils (Spanish: ayuntamientos), local corporations with independent legal personality composed of a mayor, a government council and an elected legislative assembly. The mayor was indirectly elected by the local assembly, requiring an absolute majority; otherwise, the candidate from the most-voted party automatically became mayor (ties were resolved by drawing lots). In the case of Zaragoza, the top-tier administrative and governing body was the City Council of Zaragoza.

=== Date ===
The term of local assemblies in Spain expired four years after the date of their previous election, with election day being fixed for the fourth Sunday of May every four years. The election decree was required to be issued no later than 54 days before the scheduled election date and published on the following day in the Official State Gazette (BOE). The previous local elections were held on 26 May 2019, setting the date for election day on the fourth Sunday of May four years later, which was 28 May 2023.

Local assemblies could not be dissolved before the expiration of their term, except in cases of mismanagement that seriously harmed the public interest and implied a breach of constitutional obligations, in which case the Council of Ministers could—optionally—decide to call a by-election.

Elections to the assemblies of local entities were officially called on 4 April 2023 with the publication of the corresponding decree in the BOE, setting election day for 28 May.

=== Electoral system ===
Voting for local assemblies was based on universal suffrage, comprising all Spanish nationals over 18 years of age, registered and residing in the municipality and with full political rights (provided that they had not been deprived of the right to vote by a final sentence), as well as resident non-national European citizens, and those whose country of origin allowed reciprocal voting by virtue of a treaty.

Local councillors were elected using the D'Hondt method and closed-list proportional voting, with a five percent-threshold of valid votes (including blank ballots) in each municipality. Each municipality was a multi-member constituency, with a number of seats based on the following scale:

Population	Councillors
<100	3
101–250	5
251–1,000	7
1,001–2,000	9
2,001–5,000	11
5,001–10,000	13
10,001–20,000	17
20,001–50,000	21
50,001–100,000	25
>100,001	+1 per each 100,000 inhabitants or fraction +1 if total is an even number

The law did not provide for by-elections to fill vacant seats; instead, any vacancies arising after the proclamation of candidates and during the legislative term were filled by the next candidates on the party lists or, when required, by designated substitutes.

== Parties and candidates ==
The electoral law allowed for parties and federations registered in the interior ministry, alliances and groupings of electors to present lists of candidates. Parties and federations intending to form an alliance were required to inform the relevant electoral commission within 10 days of the election call, whereas groupings of electors needed to secure the signature of a determined amount of the electors registered in the municipality for which they sought election, disallowing electors from signing for more than one list. In the case of Zaragoza, as its population was between 300,001 and 1,000,000, at least 5,000 signatures were required. Additionally, a balanced composition of men and women was required in the electoral lists, so that candidates of either sex made up at least 40 percent of the total composition.

Below is a list of the main parties and alliances which contested the election:

Candidacy	Parties and alliances	Leading candidate	Ideology	Previous result		Gov.	Ref.
Candidacy	Parties and alliances	Leading candidate	Ideology	Vote %	Seats	Gov.	Ref.
PSOE	List: Spanish Socialist Workers' Party (PSOE)	Lola Ranera	Social democracy	28.0%	10	No	
PP	List: People's Party (PP)	Natalia Chueca	Conservatism; Christian democracy	22.0%	8	Yes	
CS– Tú Aragón	List: Citizens–Party of the Citizenry (CS); You Aragon (Tú Aragón)	Daniel Pérez Calvo	Liberalism	18.3%	6	Yes	
ZGZ/ZeC	List: United Left of Aragon (IU) – Communist Party of Aragon (PCE–A) – The Dawn Marxist Organization (La Aurora (OM)) – Republican Left (IR)	Elena Tomás	Localism; Left-wing populism Participatory democracy	10.1%	3	No	
Podemos–AV	List: We Can (Podemos); Green Alliance (AV)	Fernando Rivarés	Left-wing populism Direct democracy Democratic socialism	6.2%	2	No	
Vox	List: Vox (Vox)	Julio Calvo	Right-wing populism Ultranationalism; National conservatism	6.2%	2	No	

== Opinion polls ==
The tables below list opinion polling results in reverse chronological order, showing the most recent first and using the dates when the survey fieldwork was done, as opposed to the date of publication. Where the fieldwork dates are unknown, the date of publication is given instead. The highest percentage figure in each polling survey is displayed with its background shaded in the leading party's colour. If a tie ensues, this is applied to the figures with the highest percentages. The "Lead" column on the right shows the percentage-point difference between the parties with the highest percentages in a poll.

=== Voting intention estimates ===
The table below lists weighted voting intention estimates. Refusals are generally excluded from the party vote percentages, while question wording and the treatment of "don't know" responses and those not intending to vote may vary between polling organisations. When available, seat projections determined by the polling organisations are displayed below (or in place of) the percentages in a smaller font; 16 seats were required for an absolute majority in the City Council of Zaragoza.

Color key:

Poll conducted after legal ban on opinion polls

Polling firm/Commissioner	Fieldwork date	Sample size	Turnout	PSOE	PP	CS	ZGZ/ZeC	Podemos	Vox	CHA	PAR	Unidas Podemos	Lead
2023 municipal election	28 May 2023	—N/a	66.6	26.4; 10	37.9; 15	1.7; 0	5.8; 2	4.5; 0	12.4; 4	4.7; 0	0.9; 0	–	11.5
GAD3/RTVE–FORTA	12–27 May 2023	1,100	?	28.0; 10/11	37.0; 14	3.0; 0	5.0; 0/2	5.0; 1/2	11.0; 4	4.0; 0	2.0; 0	–	9.0
40dB/Prisa	12–17 May 2023	800	?	26.7; 9/10	37.5; 14/15	3.2; 0	8.0; 2/3	5.3; 0/1	8.5; 3	5.7; 0/2	–	–	10.8
CIS	10–26 Apr 2023	1,088	?	26.9; 9/10	36.4; 12/14	3.6; 0	8.6; 2/3	5.6; 0/2	8.6; 2/3	5.6; 0/2	1.0; 0	–	9.5
A+M/Heraldo de Aragón	14–18 Apr 2023	800	66.2	30.7; 10/11	39.5; 14/15	2.3; 0	9.3; 3	5.8; 2	4.8; 0/2	5.4; 1/2	1.2; 0	–	8.8
Sigma Dos/El Mundo	14–17 Nov 2022	500	?	29.0; 10	39.0; 14	3.8; 0	9.3; 3	4.6; 0	6.9; 2	5.7; 2	–	–	10.0
SocioMétrica/El Español	3–7 Oct 2022	600	?	26.2; 9/10	36.9; 14/15	3.6; 0	8.1; 3	4.5; 0	11.6; 4	4.2; 0	1.6; 0	–	10.7
A+M/Heraldo de Aragón	27 Sep–6 Oct 2022	900	68.8	26.0; 9	39.6; 14	3.7; 0	6.0; 2	6.6; 2	7.4; 2	6.4; 2	1.3; 0	–	13.6
A+M/Heraldo de Aragón	4–18 Apr 2022	800	68.6	21.7; 7	42.9; 15	6.3; 2	6.6; 2	5.3; 1	7.3; 2	6.4; 2	1.9; 0	–	21.2
EM-Analytics/Electomanía	13 May–6 Aug 2021	405	?	24.5; 9	35.7; 13	5.0; 1	7.7; 2	5.1; 1	8.9; 3	6.8; 2	1.6; 0	–	11.2
A+M/Heraldo de Aragón	15–16 Apr 2021	800	66.2	28.7; 10	36.9; 14	5.2; 1	5.9; 2	4.6; 0	7.6; 2	6.9; 2	1.4; 0	–	8.2
November 2019 general election	10 Nov 2019	—N/a	72.5	30.0 (10)	23.2 (8)	9.6 (3)	(Note: Within Unidas Podemos.)		17.3 (6)	4.9 (0)	–	12.0 (4)	6.8
2019 municipal election	26 May 2019	—N/a	65.8	28.0; 10	22.0; 8	18.3; 6	10.1; 3	6.2; 2	6.2; 2	4.6; 0	1.7; 0	–	6.0

=== Voting preferences ===
The table below lists raw, unweighted voting preferences.

Polling firm/Commissioner	Fieldwork date	Sample size	PSOE	PP	CS	ZGZ/ZeC	Podemos	Vox	CHA	PAR	Unidas Podemos	Question	X mark	Lead
2023 municipal election	28 May 2023	—N/a	17.4	25.0	1.1	3.8	3.0	8.2	3.1	0.6	–	—N/a	33.4	7.6
40dB/Prisa	12–17 May 2023	800	15.6	22.3	3.0	5.4	4.0	8.2	4.2	0.4	–	23.4	6.8	6.7
CIS	10–26 Apr 2023	1,088	18.8	25.9	1.4	6.1	3.7	6.8	2.6	0.4	–	26.9	3.4	7.1
Fundación DFA/City Council	16 Feb–22 Mar 2023	2,025	10.3	18.4	1.1	1.4	1.9	4.9	0.5	0.3	–	47.9	8.8	8.1
Fundación DFA/City Council	24 Oct–29 Nov 2022	2,030	12.5	18.1	0.9	1.6	2.8	6.3	0.9	0.0	–	40.9	10.0	5.6
Fundación DFA/City Council	6 Apr–16 May 2022	2,025	13.3	19.7	1.4	2.3	2.7	6.4	1.3	0.2	–	35.1	10.4	6.4
Fundación DFA/City Council	27 Oct–29 Nov 2021	2,025	12.1	18.4	1.5	2.6	2.9	5.8	1.0	0.1	–	38.0	9.2	6.3
Fundación DFA/City Council	10 May–11 Jun 2021	2,025	12.9	21.1	3.1	3.6	2.4	5.2	0.6	0.3	–	31.5	10.4	8.2
Fundación DFA/City Council	9 Nov–2 Dec 2020	2,025	14.3	15.4	4.0	3.1	2.4	4.7	0.4	0.3	–	35.0	10.7	1.1
Fundación DFA/City Council	25 May–2 Jul 2020	2,038	16.8	17.7	3.7	3.7	4.2	3.9	1.0	0.2	–	28.8	13.8	0.9
November 2019 general election (Note: Does not include non-resident citizens.)	10 Nov 2019	—N/a	21.6	16.7	6.9			12.5	3.5	–	8.7	—N/a	28.7	4.9
2019 municipal election	26 May 2019	—N/a	18.1	14.2	11.8	6.5	4.0	4.0	3.1	1.1	–	—N/a	34.2	3.9

== Results ==
← Summary of the 28 May 2023 City Council of Zaragoza election results →
Parties and alliances	Popular vote			Seats	
Parties and alliances	Votes	%	±pp	Total	+/−
People's Party (PP)	125,751	37.88	+15.84	15	+7
Spanish Socialist Workers' Party (PSOE)	87,790	26.45	−1.55	10	±0
Vox (Vox)	41,061	12.37	+6.20	4	+2
Zaragoza in Common: United Left–Let's Win Zaragoza (ZGZ/ZeC)	19,381	5.84	−4.24	2	−1
Aragonese Union (CHA)	15,757	4.75	+0.13	0	±0
We Can–Green Alliance (Podemos–AV)	14,908	4.49	−1.71	0	−2
Aragon Exists–Exists Coalition (Existe)	8,081	2.43	New	0	±0
Citizens–You Aragon (CS–Tú Aragón)	5,530	1.67	−16.60	0	−6
Aragonese Party (PAR)	2,902	0.87	−0.82	0	±0
Zaragoza Now (Zaragoza Ya)	2,104	0.63	New	0	±0
Blank Seats to Leave Empty Seats (EB)	1,641	0.49	+0.26	0	±0
Communist Party of the Workers of Spain (PCTE)	699	0.21	+0.14	0	±0
For a Fairer World (PUM+J)	601	0.18	New	0	±0
Federation of Independents of Aragon (FIA)	370	0.11	+0.05	0	±0
We Propose for Minorities (Proponemos XM)	188	0.06	New	0	±0
Blank ballots	5,202	1.57	+0.93		
Total	331,966			31	±0
Valid votes	331,966	98.99	−0.61		
Invalid votes	3,384	1.01	+0.61		
Votes cast / turnout	335,350	66.57	+0.76		
Abstentions	168,393	33.43	−0.76		
Registered voters	503,743				

Popular vote
PP	37.88%
PSOE	26.45%
Vox	12.37%
ZGZ/ZeC	5.84%
CHA	4.75%
Podemos–AV	4.49%
Existe	2.43%
CS–Tú Aragón	1.67%
Others	2.56%
Blank ballots	1.57%

Seats
PP	48.39%
PSOE	32.26%
Vox	12.90%
ZGZ/ZeC	6.45%

== Aftermath ==
=== Government formation ===
Investiture
Ballot →	17 June 2023	
Required majority →	16 out of 31	
Natalia Chueca (PP): • PP (15)	15 / 31	check
Lola Ranera (PSOE): • PSOE (10)	10 / 31	X mark
Julio Calvo (Vox): • Vox (4)	4 / 31	X mark
Elena Tomás (ZGZ/ZeC): • ZGZ/ZeC (2)	2 / 31	X mark
Abstentions/Blank ballots	0 / 31	
Absentees	0 / 31	

== Bibliography ==
- Constitución Española (Constitution). Official State Gazette (in Spanish). 27 December 1978 [version as of 27 September 2011]. BOE-A-1978-31229.
- Ley 7/1985, de 2 de abril, Reguladora de las Bases del Régimen Local (Law 7/1985). Official State Gazette (in Spanish). 2 April 1985 [version as of 29 December 2021]. BOE-A-1985-5392.
- Ley Orgánica 5/1985, de 19 de junio, del Régimen Electoral General (Organic Law 5/1985). Official State Gazette (in Spanish). 19 June 1985 [version as of 3 October 2022]. BOE-A-1985-11672.
- Real Decreto 207/2023, de 3 de abril, por el que se convocan elecciones locales y a las Asambleas de Ceuta y Melilla para el 28 de mayo de 2023 (Royal Decree 207/2023). Official State Gazette (in Spanish). 3 April 2023. BOE-A-2023-8458.
