= Violeta Barba =

Spanish politician (born 1987)

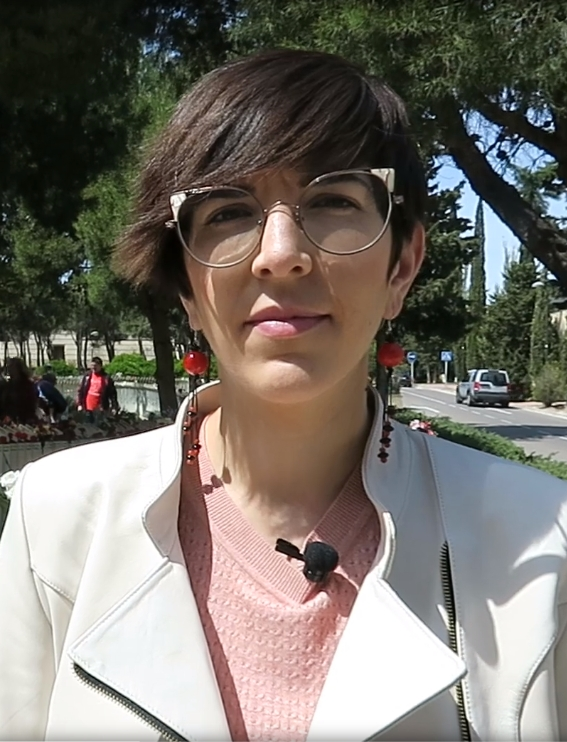

President of the Cortes of Aragon
- In office September 2016 – 26 May 2019
- Preceded by: Antonio Cosculluela
- Succeeded by: Javier Sada

Member of the Cortes of Aragon
- In office 24 May 2015 – 26 May 2019
- Constituency: Zaragoza

Member of Zaragoza City Council
- In office 26 May 2019 – 3 June 2019

Personal details
- Born: 1987 (age 38–39) Zaragoza, Aragon, Spain
- Party: Podemos
- Education: University of Zaragoza
- Profession: Lawyer

Violeta Barba Borderías (born 1987) is a Spanish lawyer and former politician of the Podemos party. Formerly the leader of the youth sector of the United Left of Aragon, she joined Podemos and was elected to the Cortes of Aragon in the 2015 election, becoming president of the Cortes (speaker) the following year; she was the first woman and youngest person in the office. She ran for mayor in the 2019 Zaragoza City Council election but resigned days after only winning two seats, and returned to the legal profession.

== Biography ==
Born in Zaragoza, Aragon, Barba graduated with a law degree from the University of Zaragoza and became a labour lawyer. After taking part in the 15M movement, she led the youth sector of the United Left of Aragon, and left in late 2014. Endorsed by party leader Pablo Iglesias, she ran for leader of Podemos in her native region against Pablo Echenique, but later conceded and ran as number two on his list as he was elected with 100% of the votes.

In the 2015 Aragonese regional election, Podemos led by Echenique came third with 14 out of 67 seats. Antonio Cosculluela of the Spanish Socialist Workers' Party (PSOE) was elected President of the Cortes of Aragon (speaker), with Barba as his deputy. When Cosculluela resigned in September 2016, Barba succeeded him, as the first woman in the office and the youngest person, aged 29. She was the second person from her party to preside over an autonomous legislature, after Ainhoa Aznárez in the Parliament of Navarre.

In the primaries in February, Barba took 68.37% of the votes to be Podemos's candidate for mayor in the 2019 Zaragoza City Council election on 26 May. Having come fifth and taken two of 16 seats, she resigned on 3 June, being replaced by Amparo Bella who was third on her list; she returned to her legal practice.
