= Ángel Cristóbal =

Spanish politician (1935–2022)

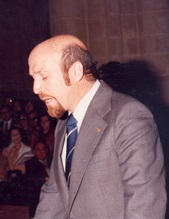

Ángel Cristóbal Montes (15 August 1935 – 15 July 2022) was a Spanish politician and professor of law.

== Biography ==
Cristóbal was born in Zaragoza and graduated with a law degree from the University of Zaragoza. In 1959, he moved to Venezuela alongside his father, a republican railway worker who was fleeing state repression during Francoist Spain. Cristóbal was a professor of civil law at the Central University of Venezuela, the Andrés Bello Catholic University and the University of Zaragoza, having returned to his homeland in 1972. He wrote more than 40 books on law, politics and philosophy.

Cristóbal began his political career in the Spanish Socialist Workers' Party (PSOE) and was elected to the Congress of Deputies in 1977, during the Spanish transition to democracy. He was a minister in the General Deputation of Aragon, the pre-autonomous government of the region.

In 1982, Cristóbal defected to the People's Alliance (AP), which would eventually become the People's Party (PP). He was a deputy in the Cortes of Aragon from 1987 to 2007, and the president (speaker) of the legislature in its third session, from 1991 to 1995. The PP did not hold the presidency again until the appointment of María Navarro in 2026.

Cristóbal died on 15 July 2022, aged 86. He died in hospital in his hometown, of complications from COVID-19. The Cortes of Aragon declared three days of mourning.
