= Elisa Moreu =

Spanish lawyer, legal scholar and professor of law

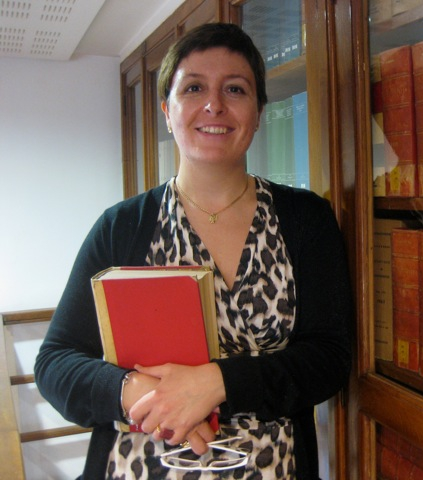
- Professor Elisa Moreu

Member of the Advisory Council of Aragon
- In office 2017–2023
- Appointed by: Government of Aragon
- President: Javier Lambán

Member of the Research Ethics Committee of Aragon
- In office 2010–2021
- Appointed by: Government of Aragon
- President: Marcelino Iglesias

Personal details
- Born: Elisa Moreu Carbonell; 1971 (age 54–55) Huesca (Aragon); Spain
- Education: University of Zaragoza
- Occupation: Lawyer, jurist and university teacher

Elisa Moreu Carbonell (born 1971) is a Spanish lawyer, legal scholar and professor of law.

She is a full professor of Administrative Law at the University of Zaragoza, being the first woman to hold a full professorship in that area in the history of the University of Zaragoza.

She was a member (counselor) of the Advisory Council of Aragon (the supreme consultative council of Government of Aragon), appointed by the Government of Aragon, between 2017 and 2023.

She previously held the position of member of the Research Ethics Committee of Aragon (CEICA), appointed by the Government of Aragon, between 2010 and 2021.

== Biography and career ==
Elisa Moreu was born in Huesca, Aragon, in 1971. She studied a licenciate degree in law at the University of Zaragoza and graduate din 1994. Later she obtained a doctorate in law at the University of Zaragoza in 1999, with the thesis "Legal analysis of the mining public domain. Crisis of the model and proposal for revision", directed by the Spanish full professor José Bermejo Vera, and with Rafael Entrena Cuesta and Eduardo García de Enterría in the doctoral examination committee. She obtained the Gascón y Marín Public Law Prize, awarded by the Aragonese Academy of Jurisprudence and Legislation, and also the Basque-Leonese Coal Society Award, awarded by the Royal Academy of Doctors of Spain.

She has been a university teacher since 1994. Since 2005 she has been a full professor of Administrative Law at the University of Zaragoza. She is a member of the Association of Women Researchers and Technologists (AMIT) and of the European Platform of Women Scientists. She has been a researcher at the University of Bochum (Germany), Sorbonne University (France) and University of Freiburg (Germany). She is also a member of the Spanish Association of Urban Planning Law (AEDUR).

Between 2010 and 2021 Moreu was a member of the Research Ethics Committee of the Community of Aragon (CEICA) of Aragon appointed by the Government of Aragon, a committee made up of 15 members who advise the Government of Aragon on ethics of the research and science.

In 2024, Moreu was appointed full professor of Administrative Law, becoming the first woman to hold a full professorship in Administrative Law in the history of the University of Zaragoza.

=== Advisory Council of Aragon ===
In 2017, she was appointed member (counselor) of the Advisory Council of Aragon by the Government of Aragon, the supreme consultative council of Government of Aragon, made up of 9 members of recognized prestige in the field of Law (according to its law, the Law 1/2009, of March 30, of the Advisory Council of Aragon).

Moreu was appointed along with the senior lawyer of the Cortes of Aragon, Vega Estella, and the State Attorney, Gabriel Morales, within the appointments of jurists of recognized competence and prestige. She was appointed for the 2017–2020 term of the Advisory Council and was renewed as a councilor for a second term (2020–2023 term). She ceased his position, due to the expiration of the term of his appointment, in the year 2023.

== Publications ==
=== Books ===
- Derecho administrativo fácil. Parte especial, Prensas Universitarias de Zaragoza, 2021.
- Derecho administrativo fácil. Parte general, Prensas Universitarias de Zaragoza, 2021.
- La administración anunciante: régimen jurídico de la publicidad institucional, Thomson Reuters Aranzadi, 2005.
- El examen en el nuevo sistema educativo español: régimen jurídico de los exámenes académicos, Comares, 2003.
- Minas: régimen jurídico de las actividades extractivas, Tirant lo Blanch, 2001.

=== Articles ===
- "Environmental compensation in German law", Revista Aragonesa de Administración Pública, 2022.
- "General principles of administrative action: Programming, forms of administrative action, control of effectiveness and efficiency and rights of people who relate to the Administration", Revista Aragonesa de Administración Pública, 2022.
- "The regulation of neuro-rights", Revista general de legislación y jurisprudencia, 2022.
- "The Regulation of neuro-rights", European review of digital administration & law, 2021.
- "Legal framework for the extraction of hydrocarbons through hydraulic fracturing (Fracking)", Revista Catalana de Dret Ambiental, 2012.
- "Demystification, privatization and globalization of public goods: from the public domain to "public domain obligations"", Revista de administración pública, 2003.
- "Legal regime of extractive activities in German Law: a suggestive mirror for our mining public domain", Revista de administración pública, 2000.

== See also ==
- University of Zaragoza
- José Bermejo Vera
