= Cosculluela (surname) =

Cosculluela is a Spanish surname, relating to the settlements of Coscojuela de Fantova or Coscojuela de Sobrarbe in the Province of Huesca. Notable people with the surname include:

- Cosculluela (born 1980), Puerto Rican rapper, full name José Fernando Cosculluela Suárez
- Antonio Cosculluela (born 1953), Spanish politician
- Luis Cosculluela (born 1939), Spanish politician

== See also ==
- Ma. Carissa Coscolluela, Filipina politician
