= Marta Fernández =

Marta Fernández may refer to:

- Marta Fernández (basketball) (born 1981), Spanish basketball player
- Marta Fernández Martín (born 1966), Spanish politician
- Marta Fernández Cornago (born 1993), Spanish politician
- Marta Fernández Infante (born 1994), Spanish paralympic swimmer
- Marta Fernández Miranda de Batista (1923–2006), first lady of Cuba
- Marta Fernández Vázquez (born 1973), Spanish writer
