= Marta Fernández Martín =

Spanish politician (born 1966)

Marta Fernández
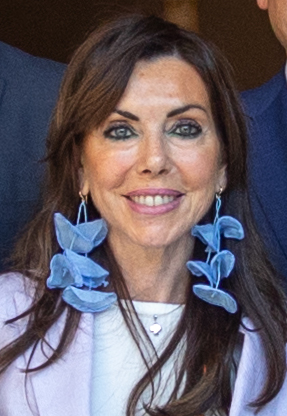

President of the Cortes of Aragon
- In office 23 June 2023 – 3 March 2026
- Preceded by: Javier Sada
- Succeeded by: María Navarro

Member of the Cortes of Aragon
- Incumbent
- Assumed office 20 June 2019
- Constituency: Zaragoza

Personal details
- Born: 23 August 1966 (age 60) Zaragoza, Aragon, Spain
- Party: Vox
- Education: University of Zaragoza
- Profession: Lawyer

Marta Fernández Martín (born 23 August 1966) is a Spanish politician of the party Vox. She was elected to the Cortes of Aragon in 2023 and served as its president from 2023 to 2026.

== Biography ==
Born in Zaragoza, Aragon, Fernández graduated with a law degree from the University of Zaragoza and worked as a lawyer for four years. After one year as an administrative assistant at Ibercaja Banco, she was in charge of human resources at Osca Gas between 1999 and 2019.

Fernández was one of three deputies elected to the Cortes of Aragon for Vox in the 2019 election. In 2023, the party increased to seven seats and she was installed as the president of the Cortes (speaker) after an agreement with the ruling People's Party. She was the second woman in the office, after Violeta Barba.

Fernández disabled her previous social media accounts after becoming president. She said that this was because the previous account was for her as a politician, while her new account represents an institution. She had previously used social media to criticise COVID-19 measures, deny climate change, attack prime minister of Spain Pedro Sánchez as a "communist dictator" and say that Irene Montero only knows how to "get down on her knees".

A snap election was held in Aragon in February 2026, in which Vox remained the third largest party but doubled its seats from 7 to 14. Fernández was second on Vox's list in Zaragoza behind Santiago Morón, and was re-elected. The new legislature voted María Navarro of the People's Party (PP) as its president, following Vox's abstention.
