= Mar Vaquero =

Spanish politician

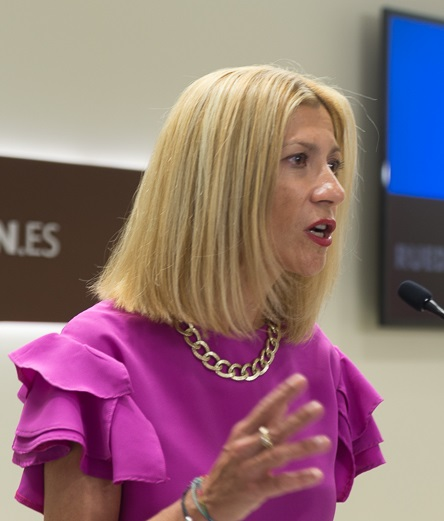
Vaquero in 2019

María del Mar Vaquero Periánez (born 26 June 1970) is a Spanish politician of the People's Party (PP). A member of the Cortes of Aragon since 2011, she became vice president of the Government of Aragon in 2024. She was the mayor of María de Huerva from 2007 to 2019.

== Biography ==
Vaquero was born in San Sebastián in the Basque Country and is the mother of two daughters. She graduated with a law degree from the University of Zaragoza as well as a master's degree in international relations and a further degree in labour law and social security. A member of the Illustrious College of Lawyers of Zaragoza since 1995, she put her legal practice on hiatus due to her political career.

Vaquero was elected to the town council in María de Huerva in the Province of Zaragoza in 2003, becoming mayor in 2007 and remaining in office for 12 years before declining to run again. Each of her terms resulted in a larger absolute majority for the PP in the council.

Vaquero was elected to the Cortes of Aragon in the 2011 Aragonese regional election by the Zaragoza constituency. In March 2017, she became secretary-general of the People's Party of Aragon, second-in-command to Luis María Beamonte. In January 2022, she replaced Beamonte as the party's parliamentary spokesperson.

After the 2023 Aragonese regional election, the PP under Jorge Azcón formed a government with Vox. Azcón became President of the Government of Aragon, with Vox leader Alejandro Nolasco first vice president and Vaquero the second; she was also Minister of Economy, Employment and Industry. Nolasco resigned in July 2024 in a row over immigration, making Vaquero the sole vice president in a PP-only government, and taking Nolasco's portfolio as Minister of Justice.
