= 2015 Zaragoza municipal election =

Election in the Spanish municipality of Zaragoza

- 24 May 2015

All 31 seats in the City Council of Zaragoza 16 seats needed for a majority
- Opinion polls
- Registered: 502,076 ▲1.2%
- Turnout: 328,920 (65.5%) ▲0.4 pp
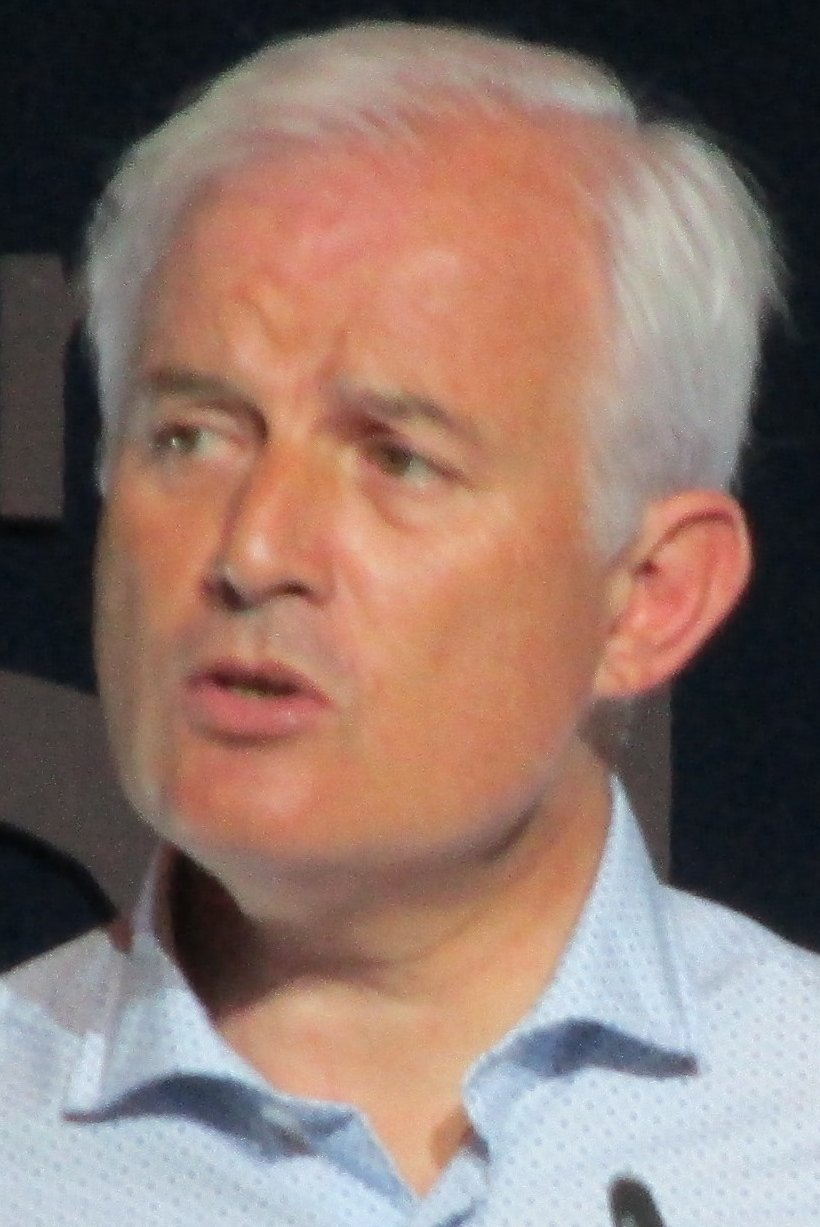

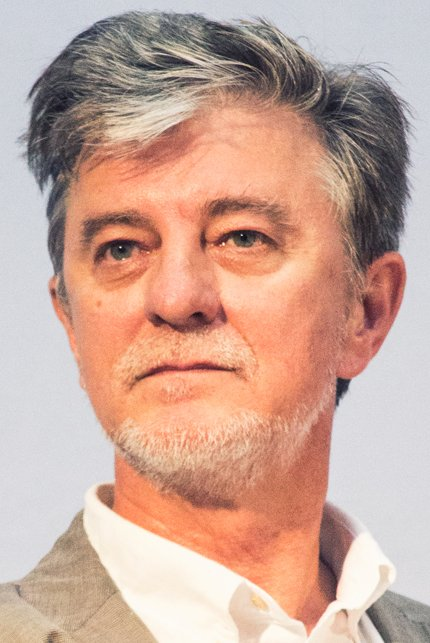

	First party	Second party	Third party
Leader	Eloy Suárez	Pedro Santisteve	Carlos Pérez Anadón
Party	PP	ZGZ	PSOE
Leader since	3 December 2010	1 March 2015	7 October 2014
Last election	15 seats, 41.3%	3 seats, 7.9% (Note: Results for IU in the 2011 election.)	10 seats, 27.1%
Seats won	10	9	6
Seat change	▼5	▲6	▼4
Popular vote	87,569	80,055	60,807
Percentage	26.9%	24.6%	18.7%
Swing	▼14.4 pp	▲16.7 pp	▼8.4 pp
	Fourth party	Fifth party
Leader	Elena Martínez Ortín	Juan Martín Expósito
Party	C's	CHA
Leader since	14 April 2015	18 December 2018
Last election	Did not contest	3 seats, 9.2%
Seats won	4	2
Seat change	▲4	▼1
Popular vote	40,018	22,067
Percentage	12.3%	6.8%
Swing	New party	▼2.4 pp
Mayor before election
Juan Alberto Belloch
PSOE
Mayor after election
Pedro Santisteve
ZGZ

A municipal election was held in Zaragoza on 24 May 2015 to elect the 10th City Council of the municipality. All 31 seats in the City Council were up for election. It was held concurrently with regional elections in thirteen autonomous communities and local elections all across Spain.

== Overview ==
Under the 1978 Constitution, the governance of municipalities in Spain—part of the country's local government system—was centered on the figure of city councils (Spanish: ayuntamientos), local corporations with independent legal personality composed of a mayor, a government council and an elected legislative assembly. The mayor was indirectly elected by the local assembly, requiring an absolute majority; otherwise, the candidate from the most-voted party automatically became mayor (ties were resolved by drawing lots). In the case of Zaragoza, the top-tier administrative and governing body was the City Council of Zaragoza.

=== Date ===
The term of local assemblies in Spain expired four years after the date of their previous election, with election day being fixed for the fourth Sunday of May every four years. The election decree was required to be issued no later than 54 days before the scheduled election date and published on the following day in the Official State Gazette (BOE). The previous local elections were held on 22 May 2011, setting the date for election day on the fourth Sunday of May four years later, which was 24 May 2015.

Local assemblies could not be dissolved before the expiration of their term, except in cases of mismanagement that seriously harmed the public interest and implied a breach of constitutional obligations, in which case the Council of Ministers could—optionally—decide to call a by-election.

Elections to the assemblies of local entities were officially called on 31 March 2015 with the publication of the corresponding decree in the BOE, setting election day for 24 May.

=== Electoral system ===
Voting for local assemblies was based on universal suffrage, comprising all Spanish nationals over 18 years of age, registered and residing in the municipality and with full political rights (provided that they had not been deprived of the right to vote by a final sentence, nor were legally incapacitated), as well as resident non-national European citizens, and those whose country of origin allowed reciprocal voting by virtue of a treaty.

Local councillors were elected using the D'Hondt method and closed-list proportional voting, with a five percent-threshold of valid votes (including blank ballots) in each municipality. Each municipality was a multi-member constituency, with a number of seats based on the following scale:

Population	Councillors
<100	3
101–250	5
251–1,000	7
1,001–2,000	9
2,001–5,000	11
5,001–10,000	13
10,001–20,000	17
20,001–50,000	21
50,001–100,000	25
>100,001	+1 per each 100,000 inhabitants or fraction +1 if total is an even number

The law did not provide for by-elections to fill vacant seats; instead, any vacancies arising after the proclamation of candidates and during the legislative term were filled by the next candidates on the party lists or, when required, by designated substitutes.

== Parties and candidates ==
The electoral law allowed for parties and federations registered in the interior ministry, alliances and groupings of electors to present lists of candidates. Parties and federations intending to form an alliance were required to inform the relevant electoral commission within 10 days of the election call, whereas groupings of electors needed to secure the signature of a determined amount of the electors registered in the municipality for which they sought election, disallowing electors from signing for more than one list. In the case of Zaragoza, as its population was between 300,001 and 1,000,000, at least 5,000 signatures were required. Additionally, a balanced composition of men and women was required in the electoral lists, so that candidates of either sex made up at least 40 percent of the total composition.

Below is a list of the main parties and alliances which contested the election:

Candidacy	Parties and alliances	Leading candidate	Ideology	Previous result		Gov.	Ref.
Candidacy	Parties and alliances	Leading candidate	Ideology	Vote %	Seats	Gov.	Ref.
PP	List: People's Party (PP)	Eloy Suárez	Conservatism; Christian democracy	41.3%	15	No	
PSOE	List: Spanish Socialist Workers' Party (PSOE)	Carlos Pérez Anadón	Social democracy	27.1%	10	Yes	
CHA	List: Aragonese Union (CHA)	Juan Martín Expósito	Aragonese nationalism Eco-socialism	9.2%	3	No	
ZGZ	List: United Left of Aragon (IU) – Communist Party of Aragon (PCE–A) – The Dawn Marxist Organization (La Aurora (OM)) – Republican Left (IR) – Open Left (IzAb); We Can (Podemos); Equo (Equo); Puyalón de Cuchas (Puyalón)	Pedro Santisteve	Localism; Left-wing populism Participatory democracy	7.9%	3	No	
PAR	List: Aragonese Party (PAR)	Xavier de Pedro	Regionalism; Centrism	4.5%	0	No	
UPyD	List: Union, Progress and Democracy (UPyD)	Jesús López Floria	Social liberalism Radical centrism	3.6%	0	No	
C's	List: Citizens–Party of the Citizenry (C's)	Elena Martínez Ortín	Liberalism	Did not contest		No	

== Opinion polls ==
The tables below list opinion polling results in reverse chronological order, showing the most recent first and using the dates when the survey fieldwork was done, as opposed to the date of publication. Where the fieldwork dates are unknown, the date of publication is given instead. The highest percentage figure in each polling survey is displayed with its background shaded in the leading party's colour. If a tie ensues, this is applied to the figures with the highest percentages. The "Lead" column on the right shows the percentage-point difference between the parties with the highest percentages in a poll.

=== Voting intention estimates ===
The table below lists weighted voting intention estimates. Refusals are generally excluded from the party vote percentages, while question wording and the treatment of "don't know" responses and those not intending to vote may vary between polling organisations. When available, seat projections determined by the polling organisations are displayed below (or in place of) the percentages in a smaller font; 16 seats were required for an absolute majority in the City Council of Zaragoza.

Color key:

Poll conducted after legal ban on opinion polls Exit poll

Polling firm/Commissioner	Fieldwork date	Sample size	Turnout	PP	PSOE	CHA	IU	PAR	UPyD	Podemos	Cs	ZGZ	Lead
2015 municipal election	24 May 2015	—N/a	65.5	26.9; 10	18.7; 6	6.8; 2	(Note: Within ZGZ.)	2.8; 0	1.5; 0		12.3; 4	24.6; 9	2.3
TNS Demoscopia/RTVE–FORTA	24 May 2015	?	?	24.1; 8/9	16.5; 5/6	6.9; 1/2		–	–		12.4; 4/5	27.7; 9/11	3.6
GAD3/Antena 3	11–22 May 2015	?	?	? 9	? 6/7	? 2		–	–		? 4/5	? 8/9	?
SoydeZaragoza.es	16–17 May 2015	900	?	? 9/10	? 6/7	? 2/3		–	–		? 4/5	? 10/11	?
JM&A/Público	12 May 2015	?	?	? 9	? 7	? 2		–	–		? 5	? 8	?
JM&A/Público	3 May 2015	?	?	25.8; 9	20.2; 7	6.8; 2		3.6; 0	1.4; 0		16.3; 5	22.0; 8	3.8
GAD3/ABC	20–29 Apr 2015	?	?	? 9	? 7	? 2		–	–		? 6	? 7	?
A+M/Heraldo de Aragón	15–17 Apr 2015	1,056	68.7	27.0; 9/11	20.3; 7/8	7.8; 1/2		4.1; 0	1.2; 0		15.0; 5/6	20.5; 7/8	6.5
CIS	23 Mar–20 Apr 2015	741	?	27.3; 9/10	20.0; 7	7.1; 2		4.4; 0	–		14.4; 5	21.8; 7/8	5.5
ZGZ	24–29 Mar 2015	380	65.5	24.5; 8/9	20.0; 7/8	4.0; 0		3.0; 0	1.5; 0		17.5; 6/7	23.5; 8/9	1.0
Llorente & Cuenca	31 Oct 2014	?	?	? 10/12	? 8/10	? 3	? 2/3	? 1	? 1	? 6/7	–	–	?
2014 EP election	25 May 2014	—N/a	48.6	24.4 (10)	20.6 (9)	5.0 (0)	10.5 (4)	–	10.0 (4)	11.0 (4)	3.6 (0)	–	3.8
AC–MyWord/El Periódico	11 May 2014	?	61.5	27.3; 11	25.3; 10	6.3; 2	12.8; 5	2.2; 0	8.8; 3	–	–	–	2.0
A+M/Heraldo de Aragón	6–12 Mar 2014	1,000	61.2	32.1; 10/11	29.4; 9/10	8.7; 2/3	7.2; 2	5.2; 0/1	10.8; 3/4	–	–	–	2.7
AC Consultores/El Periódico (Note: Undecided and/or abstentionists excluded.)	19 Jan 2014	?	59.0	27.0; 9/10	27.0; 10/11	12.0; 3/4	17.0; 5/6	3.0; 0	7.0; 2	–	–	–	Tie
AC Consultores/El Periódico	21 Apr 2013	?	57.0	21.0; 8/9	32.0; 10/11	12.0; 3/4	18.0; 5/6	2.0; 0	14.0; 3/4	–	–	–	11.0
2011 general election	20 Nov 2011	—N/a	72.8	45.8 (15)	29.3 (10)	(Note: Within IU.)	12.7 (4)	(Note: Within PP.)	7.4 (2)	–	–	–	16.5
2011 municipal election	22 May 2011	—N/a	65.1	41.3; 15	27.1; 10	9.2; 3	7.9; 3	4.5; 0	3.6; 0	–	–	–	14.2

=== Voting preferences ===
The table below lists raw, unweighted voting preferences.

Polling firm/Commissioner	Fieldwork date	Sample size	PP	PSOE	CHA	IU	PAR	UPyD	Podemos	Cs	ZGZ	Question	X mark	Lead
2015 municipal election	24 May 2015	—N/a	17.4	12.1	4.4		1.8	1.0		8.0	15.9	—N/a	34.5	1.5
CIS	23 Mar–20 Apr 2015	741	13.0	13.8	3.1		1.2	0.7		8.4	17.8	34.0	6.9	4.0
ZGZ	24–29 Mar 2015	380	13.3	13.1	1.0		0.2	0.3		10.3	15.1	32.5	9.9	1.8
2014 EP election (Note: Does not include non-resident citizens.)	25 May 2014	—N/a	11.7	9.9	2.4	5.1	–	4.8	5.3	1.7	–	—N/a	51.4	1.8
AC Consultores/El Periódico	19 Jan 2014	?	16.0	16.0	7.0	10.0	2.0	4.0	–	–	–	17.0	24.0	Tie
AC Consultores/El Periódico	21 Apr 2013	?	12.0	18.0	7.0	10.0	1.0	8.0	–	–	–	14.0	29.0	6.0
2011 general election	20 Nov 2011	—N/a	32.9	21.1		9.1		5.3	–	–	–	—N/a	27.2	11.8
2011 municipal election	22 May 2011	—N/a	26.5	17.4	5.9	5.1	2.9	2.3	–	–	–	—N/a	34.9	9.1

== Results ==
← Summary of the 24 May 2015 City Council of Zaragoza election results →
Parties and alliances	Popular vote			Seats	
Parties and alliances	Votes	%	±pp	Total	+/−
People's Party (PP)	87,569	26.88	−14.38	10	−5
Zaragoza in Common (ZGZ)^{1}	80,055	24.57	+16.65	9	+6
Spanish Socialist Workers' Party (PSOE)	60,807	18.67	−8.47	6	−4
Citizens–Party of the Citizenry (C's)	40,018	12.28	New	4	+4
Aragonese Union (CHA)	22,067	6.77	−2.47	2	−1
Aragonese Party (PAR)	9,185	2.82	−1.72	0	±0
Union, Progress and Democracy (UPyD)	4,928	1.51	−2.07	0	±0
Blank Seats (EB)	4,426	1.36	New	0	±0
Animalist Party Against Mistreatment of Animals (PACMA)	3,849	1.18	+0.85	0	±0
Commitment with Aragon (CCA)	2,088	0.64	+0.31	0	±0
The Greens–Green Group (LV–GV)	1,818	0.56	+0.09	0	±0
Communist Party of the Peoples of Spain (PCPE)	900	0.28	+0.16	0	±0
Republican Social Movement (MSR)	629	0.19	New	0	±0
Aragonese Bloc (BAR)	465	0.14	New	0	±0
Aragonese State (EAR)	453	0.14	New	0	±0
Federation of Independents of Aragon (FIA)	374	0.11	−0.04	0	±0
Blank ballots	6,145	1.89	−1.69		
Total	325,776			31	±0
Valid votes	325,776	99.04	+0.52		
Invalid votes	3,144	0.96	−0.52		
Votes cast / turnout	328,920	65.51	+0.38		
Abstentions	173,156	34.49	−0.38		
Registered voters	502,076				
Sources
Footnotes: ^{1} Zaragoza in Common results are compared to United Left of Aragon totals in the 2011 election.

Popular vote
PP	26.88%
ZGZ	24.57%
PSOE	18.67%
C's	12.28%
CHA	6.77%
PAR	2.82%
UPyD	1.51%
EB	1.36%
PACMA	1.18%
Others	2.06%
Blank ballots	1.89%

Seats
PP	32.26%
ZGZ	29.03%
PSOE	19.35%
C's	12.90%
CHA	6.45%

== Aftermath ==
=== Government formation ===
Investiture
Ballot →	13 June 2015	
Required majority →	16 out of 31	
Pedro Santisteve (ZGZ): • ZGZ (9); • PSOE (6); • CHA (2)	17 / 31	check
Eloy Suárez (PP): • PP (10)	10 / 31	X mark
Elena Martínez Ortín (C's): • C's (4)	4 / 31	X mark
Abstentions/Blank ballots	0 / 31	
Absentees	0 / 31	

== Bibliography ==
- Constitución Española (Constitution). Official State Gazette (in Spanish). 27 December 1978 [version as of 27 September 2011]. BOE-A-1978-31229.
- Ley 7/1985, de 2 de abril, Reguladora de las Bases del Régimen Local (Law 7/1985). Official State Gazette (in Spanish). 2 April 1985 [version as of 30 December 2013]. BOE-A-1985-5392.
- Ley Orgánica 5/1985, de 19 de junio, del Régimen Electoral General (Organic Law 5/1985). Official State Gazette (in Spanish). 19 June 1985 [version as of 31 March 2015]. BOE-A-1985-11672.
- Real Decreto 233/2015, de 30 de marzo, por el que se convocan elecciones locales y a las Asambleas de Ceuta y Melilla para el 24 de mayo de 2015 (Royal Decree 233/2015). Official State Gazette (in Spanish). 30 March 2015. BOE-A-2015-3448.
