= Natalia Chueca =

Spanish politician

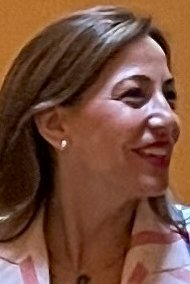
- Chueca in 2023

Mayor of Zaragoza
- Incumbent
- Assumed office 17 June 2023
- Preceded by: Jorge Azcón

Councillor in Zaragoza
- Incumbent
- Assumed office 15 June 2019

Personal details
- Born: 7 September 1976 (age 49) Zaragoza, Spain
- Party: People's Party
- Education: University of Zaragoza (MBA); EADA Business School
- Occupation: Marketing professional

Natalia Chueca Muñoz (born 1976) is a Spanish People's Party (PP) politician. She has been a member of the city council in Zaragoza since 2019 and mayor since 2023.

== Early and personal life ==
Born in Zaragoza, Chueca is married and has three children as of 2023. She graduated in business administration and management from the University of Zaragoza in 1998 and earned a Master of Business Administration from the EADA Business School in Barcelona. She worked in marketing as well as giving classes for the MBA course at ESIC University. She was director of marketing for the Zaragoza-based toy retailers Imaginarium SA.

== Political career ==
Chueca was placed sixth on the People's Party (PP) list headed by Jorge Azcón for the 2019 Zaragoza City Council election; she was the second highest candidate on the list to not have previous political experience. She was made councillor in charge of public services and mobility in Azcón's administration.

In January 2023, Azcón, in his role as leader of the People's Party of Aragon, named Chueca as his successor as candidate for mayor in the city council election. She ran on a platform including improving relationships between residents and institutions, increasing social support, improving public transport and infrastructure, and rebuilding La Romareda stadium for the 2030 FIFA World Cup.

The 2023 election results saw the PP rise by seven seats to 15 out of 31, and Chueca was invested as mayor. All three provincial capitals of Aragon, the others being Huesca and Teruel, had PP women mayors. In September 2023, she was chosen by national PP leader Alberto Núñez Feijóo as spokeswoman of the Spanish Federation of Municipalities and Provinces (FEMP).
