= Alejandro Nolasco =

Spanish politician

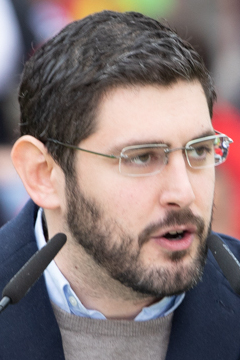
- Nolasco in 2023

First Vice President of the Government of Aragon
- Incumbent
- Assumed office 4 May 2026
- Preceded by: Mar Vaquero
- In office 12 August 2023 – 12 July 2024
- Preceded by: Arturo Aliaga
- Succeeded by: Mar Vaquero

Personal details
- Born: Alejandro Nolasco Asensio; 1991 (age 34–35) Pamplona, Navarre, Spain
- Party: Vox
- Education: Complutense University of Madrid; National University of Distance Education; Universidad CEU San Pablo

Alejandro Nolasco Asensio (born 22 August 1991) is a Spanish writer, lawyer and politician of the party Vox. He was first voted onto the city council of Teruel in 2019 and led his party to third place in the 2023 Aragonese regional election.

After the election, Vox formed a government with the People's Party (PP) and Nolasco became vice president under the presidency of the PP's Jorge Azcón. Nolasco resigned in July 2024 in a dispute over immigration. In a snap election in February 2026, Nolasco led Vox to another third place with twice as many seats as before. Vox again formed government with the PP, with Azcón as president and Nolasco vice president.

== Early life and writings ==
Born in Pamplona in Navarre, Nolasco completed his secondary education at St Mary's Springs High School in Fond du Lac, Wisconsin. He graduated in law from the Complutense University of Madrid and in philosophy from the National University of Distance Education, as well as earning a doctorate in history from the Universidad CEU San Pablo. In 2022, he published a book of the memories of the last fifty members of the Blue Division, the Spanish volunteers in the Nazi invasion of the Soviet Union.

== Political career ==
In 2017, Nolasco moved to Teruel in Aragon, where he set up a law firm. He was Vox's candidate for mayor of his adopted city in the 2019 Spanish local elections, being the only member of the party voted onto the city council; he was also an unsuccessful candidate for the Congress of Deputies in the April and November 2019 general elections, running in the Teruel constituency.

Nolasco became president of Vox in the Province of Teruel in 2020. He ran simultaneously for mayor of Teruel and President of the Government of Aragon in May 2023. In the local election, his party increased to two councillors, while in the regional election his list came third, increasing its seats in the Cortes of Aragon from three to seven.

Jorge Azcón, leader of the People's Party (PP) wished to govern alone in a minority government, but ended up forming a coalition government with Vox. Vox received two ministries, including Nolasco as vice president. Nolasco was also Minister of Territorial Development, Depopulation and Justice, while Ángel Samper Secorún, an independent nominated by Vox, was Minister of Agriculture.

In July 2024, Nolasco resigned from the government due to a dispute with the PP's decision to accommodate 20 unaccompanied migrant children (known in Spain by the acronym mena for Menor extranjero no acompañado). He said "Now they are 20 but tomorrow they could be 40, 100 or 1,000. If they rape, murder or rob it won't be on my conscience".

Vox opposed Azcón's budget for Aragon in December 2025, following which the regional president dissolved the legislature and called a snap election for February. While the three biggest parties were again the PP, Spanish Socialist Workers' Party (PSOE) and Vox, the first two lost seats while Vox doubled its seats to 14. The 17.9% vote share surpassed the 2023 Murcian regional election as Vox's best percentage in a regional election. Vox surpassed the PSOE in 26% of municipalities, including the third-biggest, Teruel. His party formed with the PP Azcón's second government, taking three out of nine ministries, including Nolasco as vice president and minister of deregulation, welfare and family. In August 2026, following the 2026 Ceuta migrant crisis, Nolasco announced Aragon's position that it would not contribute to the hosting of unaccompanied migrant minors.
