= José Manuel Rey Varela =

Spanish politician

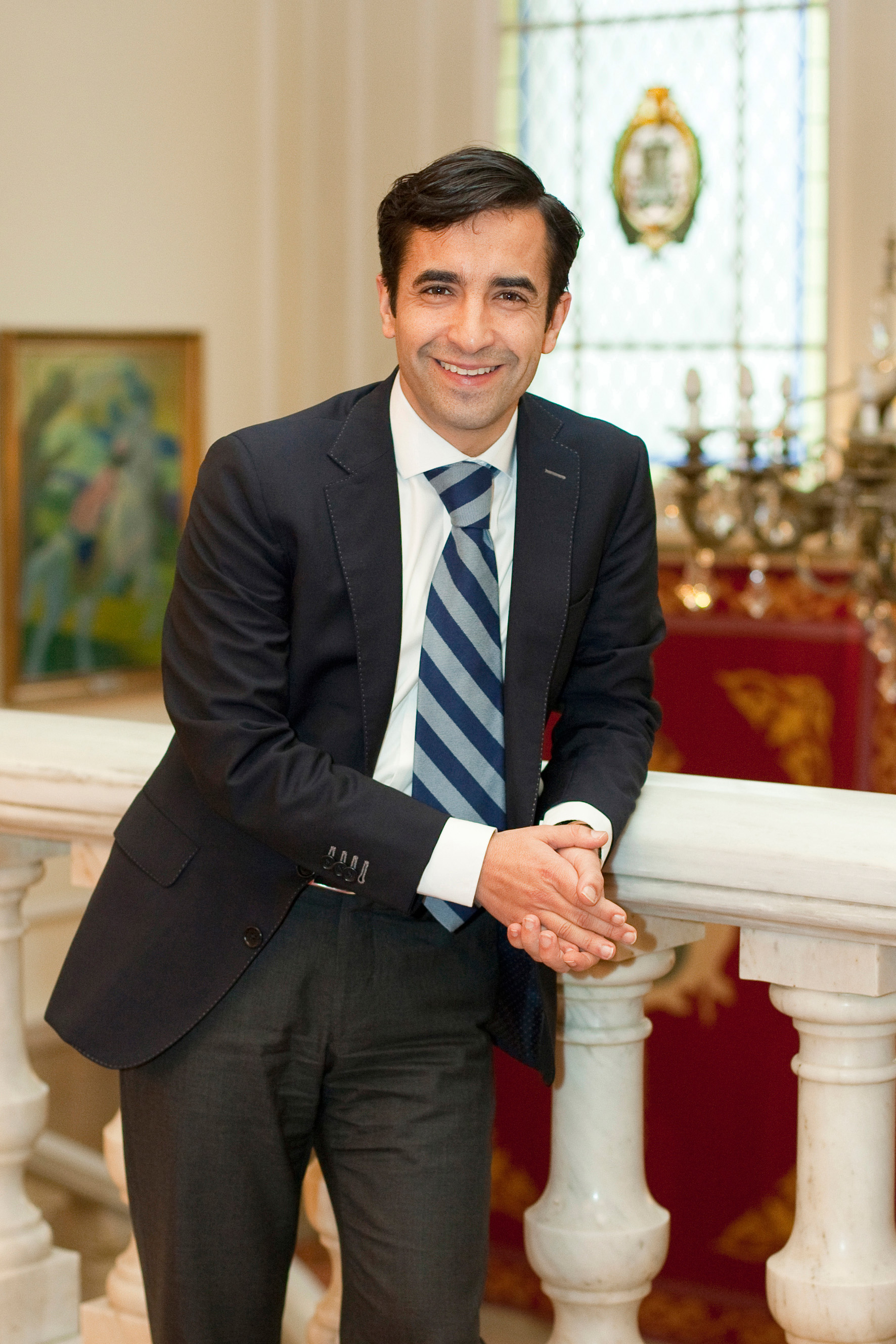

José Manuel Rey Varela (born 31 December 1975 in Ferrol) is a Spanish People's Party (PPdeG) politician as well as a solicitor, former mayor of Ferrol the industrial city and naval station of Galicia and (Spain). He is also the current president of the Galician Federation of Municipalities and Provinces (FEGAMP) and is married to María Casal Pereira.
