= List of presidents of the Cortes of Aragon =

President of Cortes of Aragon
- Presidents d'as Cortz d'Aragón
- Flag of Aragon
- Incumbent; María Navarro since 3 March 2026
- Member of: Cortes of Aragon
- Formation: 20 May 1983
- First holder: Antonio Embid
- Website: cortesaragon.es

This article lists the presidents of the Cortes of Aragon, the regional legislature of Aragon.

== Presidents ==
No.	Name	Portrait	Party	Took office	Left office	^{Legs.}	^{Refs.}
1	Antonio Embid		Socialists' Party of Aragon	20 May 1983	5 July 1987	1st	
2	Juan Bautista Monserrat		Democratic and Social Centre	6 July 1987	19 June 1991	2nd	
3	Ángel Cristóbal		People's Party of Aragon	20 June 1991	25 June 1995	3rd	
4	Emilio Eiroa		Aragonese Party	26 June 1995	6 July 1999	4th	
5	José María Mur		Aragonese Party	7 July 1999	19 June 2003	5th	
6	Francisco Pina		Socialists' Party of Aragon	20 June 2003	20 June 2007	6th	
6	Francisco Pina		Socialists' Party of Aragon	21 June 2007	20 June 2011	7th	
7	José Ángel Biel		Aragonese Party	21 June 2011	17 June 2015	8th	
8	Antonio José Cosculluela		Socialists' Party of Aragon	18 June 2015	15 September 2016	9th	
9	Violeta Barba		Podemos	15 September 2016	19 June 2019	9th	
10	Javier Sada		Socialists' Party of Aragon	19 June 2019	23 June 2023	10th	
11	Marta Fernández		Vox	23 June 2023	3 March 2026	11th	
12	María Navarro		People's Party of Aragon	3 March 2026	Incumbent	12th	
