= Julio Azcón =

Spanish footballer (1931–2022)

Julio Azcón (16 November 1931 – 27 May 2022) was a Spanish footballer who played as a midfielder.

== Biography ==
Born in Zaragoza, Aragon, Azcón began his career in minor teams Avance, Búfalo, Agrupación and Hernán Cortés. He then played for UD Amistad and SD Escoriaza in the Tercera División.

A defensive midfielder known for creativity and technique, Azcón signed for Real Zaragoza on 7 February 1953, remaining there until 27 January 1956. He played ten games in the Segunda División, scoring twice – the first on 11 October 1953 in a 5–3 win away to Escoriaza, and the latter on 17 October 1954 in a 4–1 home win over Racing de Ferrol.

Azcón then returned to Amistad before playing for French club Uzay-le-Venon, where he retired on 30 June 1957. The 25-year-old then started a construction company.

Azcón had five children. The youngest, Jorge (born 1973), became a politician and served as mayor of Zaragoza and President of the Government of Aragon.

In April 2020, Azcón was one of several elderly former employees of Real Zaragoza to receive letters of congratulation from the club during the COVID-19 pandemic in Spain. He died on 27 May 2022, aged 90.
