= Pedro Santisteve =

Spanish politician & lawyer (born 1958)

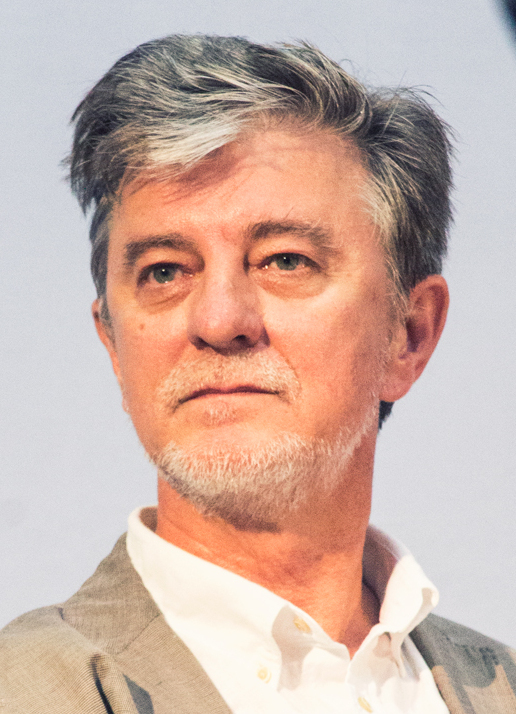
Pedro Santisteve

Pedro Santisteve Roche (born 28 May 1958) is a Spanish criminal lawyer, social activist and university professor. Part of the so-called "mayors of change", he was the mayor of Zaragoza from 13 June 2015 until 15 June 2019.

Santisteve graduated in law and has been a criminal lawyer since 1984. He is a vocal critic of the current penitentiary system and an advocate for the rights of the prisoners. He is the founder of the Asociación de Seguimiento y Apoyo a Presas y Presos en Aragón (Association for Monitoring and Supporting Prisoners in Aragon, ASAPA), which in 2000 received a medal from the Aragon Provincial Council. Since the 1990s, he has been a professor in the Faculty of Law of the University of Zaragoza.

Santisteve's political career began with the 15-M movement. In 2015 he won the party primary of Ganemos Zaragoza, which involved more than 3,700 people. As a result, Santisteve was the head of list of the political alliance Zaragoza in Común (ZeC), formed by Podemos, Izquierda Unida, Equo, Puyalón de Cuchas, Piratas de Aragón and Somos y Demos+. Santisteve's party and platform in the municipal election emphasized institutional transparency, participatory decision-making, accountability and a broader social policy. On 24 May 2015, the party won 80,040 votes (24.57%) and 9 councillors, remaining as the second political force behind PP, with 10 councilors, and above PSOE, with 6 councilors, Citizens, with 4 and CHA with 2.

On 13 June 2015, councilors from Zaragoza en Común (ZeC), PSOE and Chunta Aragonesista (CHA) parties elected Santisteve as mayor.
