= Antonio Cosculluela =

Spanish politician

Antonio José Cosculluela Bergua (born 9 March 1953) is a Spanish former politician. As a member of the Spanish Socialist Workers' Party (PSOE), he was the mayor of Barbastro (1999–2019) and president of the Provincial Deputation of Huesca (1999–2015). He was a deputy in the Cortes of Aragon from 2015 to 2019, and the president of the legislature (speaker) from 2015 to 2016. He retired after spending 2019 to 2023 in the Senate of Spain.

== Biography ==
=== Early life and career ===
Born in Barbastro in the Province of Huesca, Cosculluela is married and has three children. A member of the Spanish Socialist Workers' Party (PSOE), he was elected to his hometown's council in the first democratic elections in 1979, and twenty years later he became the mayor and also the president of the Provincial Deputation of Huesca.

In April 2012, Cosculluela was elected secretary general of the PSOE in the Province of Huesca, with 94% of the vote at their congress. That year, he held nine public offices simultaneously. According to the law, he received only the €64,607 salary from the provincial deputation presidency, and he turned down tax-exempt allowances that he was entitled to receive for attending plenary sessions in Barbastro.

=== President of the Cortes of Aragon ===
Cosculluela was the PSOE's lead candidate in the Huesca constituency in the 2015 Aragonese regional election. He was the only candidate for president (speaker) of the Cortes of Aragon and was elected with the 35 votes of his party, Podemos, Chunta Aragonesista and the United Left, while the 32 of the People's Party (PP), Aragonese Party (PAR) and Citizens abstained. He remained mayor of Barbastro but resigned as president of the provincial deputation to be succeeded by Miguel Gracia of the same party. In July 2016, he announced his resignation as president of the Cortes to focus on his office as mayor, though summer recess meant that the change would not go into effect until September.

=== Senate of Spain and retirement ===
The 2019 local elections ended Coculluela's mayoralty after 20 years, as Fernando Torres Chavarría, an independent on the PP list, was elected. Cosculluela resigned from the town council in May 2021, and that September he announced that he would not run for re-election as secretary general of the provincial PSOE.

In the April 2019 Spanish general election, Cosculluela was elected to the Senate by the Huesca constituency, as his party took three of the four seats; the result was repeated in the November 2019 election. He announced that he would not run in the 2023 Spanish general election, and would retire from politics. He said that he would return to his agricultural interests in cereals and olives, and spend more time reading and travelling, with two of his children living abroad.
