= 2019 Zaragoza municipal election =

Election in the Spanish municipality of Zaragoza

- 26 May 2019

All 31 seats in the City Council of Zaragoza 16 seats needed for a majority
- Opinion polls
- Registered: 505,756 ▲0.7%
- Turnout: 332,813 (65.8%) ▲0.3 pp
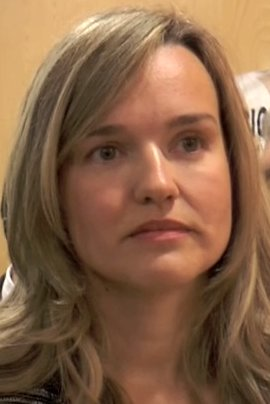

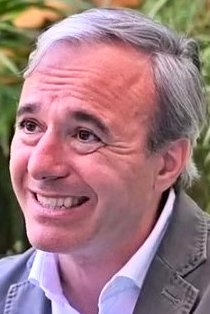

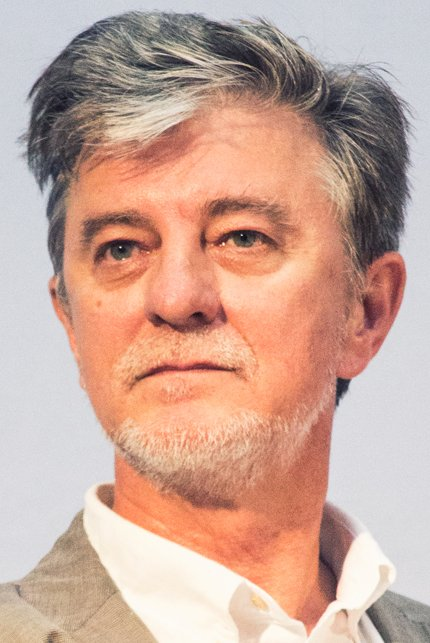

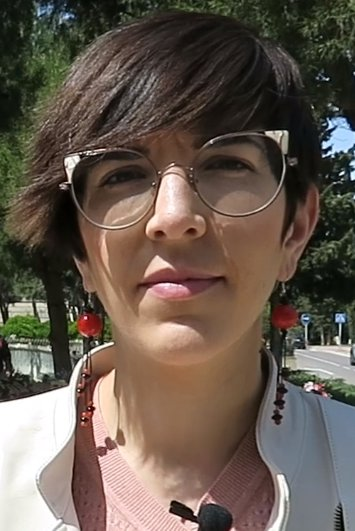

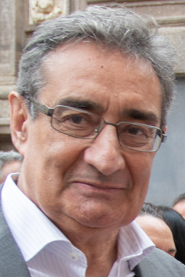
	First party	Second party	Third party
Leader	Pilar Alegría	Jorge Azcón	Sara Fernández
Party	PSOE	PP	Cs
Leader since	28 September 2018	1 February 2016	9 March 2019
Last election	6 seats, 18.7%	10 seats, 26.9%	4 seats, 12.3%
Seats won	10	8	6
Seat change	▲4	▼2	▲2
Popular vote	92,823	73,065	60,552
Percentage	28.0%	22.0%	18.3%
Swing	▲9.3 pp	▼4.9 pp	▲6.0 pp
	Fourth party	Fifth party	Sixth party
Leader	Pedro Santisteve	Violeta Barba	Julio Calvo
Party	ZGZ	Podemos–Equo	Vox
Leader since	1 March 2015	8 February 2019	22 April 2019
Last election	9 seats, 24.6%	Did not contest	Did not contest
Seats won	3	2	2
Seat change	▼6	▲2	▲2
Popular vote	33,423	20,551	20,458
Percentage	10.1%	6.2%	6.2%
Swing	▼14.5 pp	New party	New party
Mayor before election
Pedro Santisteve
ZGZ
Mayor after election
Jorge Azcón
PP

A municipal election was held in Zaragoza on 26 May 2019 to elect the 11th City Council of the municipality. All 31 seats in the City Council were up for election. It was held concurrently with regional elections in twelve autonomous communities and local elections all across Spain, as well as the 2019 European Parliament election.

== Overview ==
Under the 1978 Constitution, the governance of municipalities in Spain—part of the country's local government system—was centered on the figure of city councils (Spanish: ayuntamientos), local corporations with independent legal personality composed of a mayor, a government council and an elected legislative assembly. The mayor was indirectly elected by the local assembly, requiring an absolute majority; otherwise, the candidate from the most-voted party automatically became mayor (ties were resolved by drawing lots). In the case of Zaragoza, the top-tier administrative and governing body was the City Council of Zaragoza.

=== Date ===
The term of local assemblies in Spain expired four years after the date of their previous election, with election day being fixed for the fourth Sunday of May every four years. The election decree was required to be issued no later than 54 days before the scheduled election date and published on the following day in the Official State Gazette (BOE). The previous local elections were held on 24 May 2015, setting the date for election day on the fourth Sunday of May four years later, which was 26 May 2019.

Local assemblies could not be dissolved before the expiration of their term, except in cases of mismanagement that seriously harmed the public interest and implied a breach of constitutional obligations, in which case the Council of Ministers could—optionally—decide to call a by-election.

Elections to the assemblies of local entities were officially called on 2 April 2019 with the publication of the corresponding decree in the BOE, setting election day for 26 May.

=== Electoral system ===
Voting for local assemblies was based on universal suffrage, comprising all Spanish nationals over 18 years of age, registered and residing in the municipality and with full political rights (provided that they had not been deprived of the right to vote by a final sentence), (Note: Amendments in 2018 granted the right to vote to those legally incapacitated.) as well as resident non-national European citizens, and those whose country of origin allowed reciprocal voting by virtue of a treaty.

Local councillors were elected using the D'Hondt method and closed-list proportional voting, with a five percent-threshold of valid votes (including blank ballots) in each municipality. Each municipality was a multi-member constituency, with a number of seats based on the following scale:

Population	Councillors
<100	3
101–250	5
251–1,000	7
1,001–2,000	9
2,001–5,000	11
5,001–10,000	13
10,001–20,000	17
20,001–50,000	21
50,001–100,000	25
>100,001	+1 per each 100,000 inhabitants or fraction +1 if total is an even number

The law did not provide for by-elections to fill vacant seats; instead, any vacancies arising after the proclamation of candidates and during the legislative term were filled by the next candidates on the party lists or, when required, by designated substitutes.

== Parties and candidates ==
The electoral law allowed for parties and federations registered in the interior ministry, alliances and groupings of electors to present lists of candidates. Parties and federations intending to form an alliance were required to inform the relevant electoral commission within 10 days of the election call, whereas groupings of electors needed to secure the signature of a determined amount of the electors registered in the municipality for which they sought election, disallowing electors from signing for more than one list. In the case of Zaragoza, as its population was between 300,001 and 1,000,000, at least 5,000 signatures were required. Additionally, a balanced composition of men and women was required in the electoral lists, so that candidates of either sex made up at least 40 percent of the total composition.

Below is a list of the main parties and alliances which contested the election:

Candidacy	Parties and alliances	Leading candidate	Ideology	Previous result		Gov.	Ref.
Candidacy	Parties and alliances	Leading candidate	Ideology	Vote %	Seats	Gov.	Ref.
PP	List: People's Party (PP)	Jorge Azcón	Conservatism; Christian democracy	26.9%	10	No	
ZGZ	List: United Left of Aragon (IU) – Communist Party of Aragon (PCE–A) – The Dawn Marxist Organization (La Aurora (OM)) – Republican Left (IR) – Feminist Party of Spain (PFE); Anticapitalists (Anticapitalistas)	Pedro Santisteve	Localism; Left-wing populism Participatory democracy	24.6%	9	Yes	
PSOE	List: Spanish Socialist Workers' Party (PSOE)	Pilar Alegría	Social democracy	18.7%	6	No	
Cs	List: Citizens–Party of the Citizenry (Cs)	Sara Fernández	Liberalism	12.3%	4	No	
CHA	List: Aragonese Union (CHA)	Carmelo Asensio	Aragonese nationalism Eco-socialism	6.8%	2	No	
PAR	List: Aragonese Party (PAR)	María Elena Allué	Regionalism; Centrism	2.8%	0	No	
Podemos– Equo	List: We Can (Podemos); Equo (Equo)	Violeta Barba	Left-wing populism Direct democracy Democratic socialism	Contested in alliance (Note: Podemos and Equo contested the 2015 election within the ZGZ alliance.)		No	
Vox	List: Vox (Vox)	Julio Calvo	Right-wing populism Ultranationalism; National conservatism	Did not contest		No	

== Opinion polls ==
The tables below list opinion polling results in reverse chronological order, showing the most recent first and using the dates when the survey fieldwork was done, as opposed to the date of publication. Where the fieldwork dates are unknown, the date of publication is given instead. The highest percentage figure in each polling survey is displayed with its background shaded in the leading party's colour. If a tie ensues, this is applied to the figures with the highest percentages. The "Lead" column on the right shows the percentage-point difference between the parties with the highest percentages in a poll.

=== Voting intention estimates ===
The table below lists weighted voting intention estimates. Refusals are generally excluded from the party vote percentages, while question wording and the treatment of "don't know" responses and those not intending to vote may vary between polling organisations. When available, seat projections determined by the polling organisations are displayed below (or in place of) the percentages in a smaller font; 16 seats were required for an absolute majority in the City Council of Zaragoza.

Color key:

Exit poll

Polling firm/Commissioner	Fieldwork date	Sample size	Turnout	PP	ZGZ	PSOE	Cs	CHA	PAR	Podemos	IU	Vox	Unidas Podemos	Lead
2019 municipal election	26 May 2019	—N/a	65.8	22.0; 8	10.1; 3	28.0; 10	18.3; 6	4.6; 0	1.7; 0	6.2; 2	(Note: Within ZGZ.)	6.2; 2	–	6.0
GfK/FORTA	26 May 2019	?	?	18.2; 5/6	10.9; 3/4	27.6; 9/11	15.3; 4/5	6.5; 1/2	3.2; 0	9.6; 2/3		5.6; 0/1	–	9.4
KeyData/Público	19 May 2019	?	66.2	16.9; 6	11.7; 4	24.0; 9	17.7; 6	4.8; 0	2.2; 0	8.0; 3		8.1; 3	–	6.3
A+M/Heraldo de Aragón	9–10 May 2019	800	68.5	21.1; 7/8	10.3; 3/4	22.5; 8/9	19.3; 6/7	6.7; 2	2.0; 0	11.1; 4		5.0; 0/2	–	1.4
40dB/El País	3–8 May 2019	800	?	17.8; 6	14.0; 4/5	26.1; 9/10	15.1; 5	5.2; 1	–	10.4; 3		7.4; 2	–	8.3
April 2019 general election	28 Apr 2019	—N/a	78.5	17.2 (5)	–	30.5 (10)	21.5 (7)	–	–	(Note: Within Unidas Podemos.)		12.5 (4)	14.9 (5)	9.0
CIS	21 Mar–23 Apr 2019	498	?	24.2; 9/10	13.0; 4/6	23.5; 8/9	10.7; 3/4	5.7; 1/2	3.7; 0	11.8; 4/5		2.7; 0	–	0.7
ElectoPanel/Electomanía	31 Mar–7 Apr 2019	?	?	23.9; 8	6.1; 2	28.9; 10	13.3; 4	5.9; 2	2.6; 0	6.6; 2		10.2; 3	–	5.0
ElectoPanel/Electomanía	24–31 Mar 2019	?	?	23.6; 8	? 2	29.9; 10	13.5; 4	5.9; 2	2.8; 0	6.5; 2		10.0; 3	–	6.3
ElectoPanel/Electomanía	17–24 Mar 2019	?	?	23.6; 8	11.6; 4	29.9; 10	13.5; 4	5.9; 2	2.8; 0			10.0; 3	–	6.3
ElectoPanel/Electomanía	10–17 Mar 2019	?	?	24.1; 8	11.9; 4	28.6; 9	12.7; 4	5.8; 2	2.9; 0			11.7; 4	–	4.5
ElectoPanel/Electomanía	3–10 Mar 2019	?	?	23.6; 8	12.1; 4	28.2; 9	13.3; 4	5.7; 2	3.0; 0			11.6; 4	–	4.6
ElectoPanel/Electomanía	22 Feb–3 Mar 2019	?	?	24.1; 8	12.0; 4	27.9; 10	13.5; 5	5.6; 2	3.0; 0			11.1; 4	–	3.8
A+M/Heraldo de Aragón	3–4 Oct 2018	800	64.5	27.3; 9/10	15.2; 5/6	25.6; 9/10	18.5; 6/7	4.9; 0/1	1.6; 0			3.0; 0	–	1.7
A+M/Heraldo de Aragón	11–15 Apr 2018	800	65.0	23.9; 8/9	19.5; 6/7	21.8; 7/8	21.4; 7/8	4.9; 0/1	3.6; 0			–	–	2.1
Fundación DFA/City Council	8 Nov–1 Dec 2017	1,430	?	23.9; 8	18.7; 7	19.5; 7	17.5; 6	9.6; 3	–			–	–	4.4
A+M/Heraldo de Aragón	22–27 Nov 2017	600	69.2	25.8; 9/10	17.3; 6/7	23.4; 9/10	16.7; 5/6	7.4; 2	2.6; 0			–	–	2.4
2016 general election	26 Jun 2016	—N/a	72.6	33.8 (11)	–	22.9 (7)	17.7 (6)	–	(Note: Within PP.)			0.3 (0)	21.8 (7)	10.9
2015 general election	20 Dec 2015	—N/a	75.6	29.1 (10)	–	20.2 (6)	18.8 (6)	(Note: Within IU.)		20.7 (7)	7.0 (2)	0.4 (0)	–	8.4
2015 municipal election	24 May 2015	—N/a	65.5	26.9; 10	24.6; 9	18.7; 6	12.3; 4	6.8; 2	2.8; 0			–	–	2.3

=== Voting preferences ===
The table below lists raw, unweighted voting preferences.

Polling firm/Commissioner	Fieldwork date	Sample size	PP	ZGZ	PSOE	Cs	CHA	PAR	Podemos	IU	Vox	Unidas Podemos	Question	X mark	Lead
2019 municipal election	26 May 2019	—N/a	14.2	6.5	18.1	11.8	3.1	1.1	4.0		4.0	–	—N/a	34.2	3.9
April 2019 general election (Note: Does not include non-resident citizens.)	28 Apr 2019	—N/a	13.4	–	23.8	16.8	–	–			9.8	11.6	—N/a	21.5	7.0
CIS	21 Mar–23 Apr 2019	498	11.4	5.8	10.2	3.0	1.0	0.8	4.8		1.2	–	50.4	8.4	1.2
Fundación DFA/City Council	13 Sep–18 Oct 2018	2,072	8.4	9.8	11.6	8.6	2.4	0.2			–	–	38.7	14.1	1.8
Fundación DFA/City Council	8 Nov–1 Dec 2017	1,430	9.0	8.5	11.7	11.0	2.7	0.6			–	–	42.2	8.5	0.7
2016 general election	26 Jun 2016	—N/a	24.4	–	16.5	12.8	–				0.2	15.7	—N/a	27.4	7.9
2015 general election	20 Dec 2015	—N/a	21.9	–	15.2	14.1			15.6	5.3	0.3	–	—N/a	24.4	6.3
2015 municipal election	24 May 2015	—N/a	17.4	15.9	12.1	8.0	4.4	1.8			–	–	—N/a	34.5	1.5

== Results ==
← Summary of the 26 May 2019 City Council of Zaragoza election results →
Parties and alliances	Popular vote			Seats	
Parties and alliances	Votes	%	±pp	Total	+/−
Spanish Socialist Workers' Party (PSOE)	92,823	28.00	+9.33	10	+4
People's Party (PP)	73,065	22.04	−4.84	8	−2
Citizens–Party of the Citizenry (Cs)	60,552	18.27	+5.99	6	+2
Zaragoza in Common: United Left–Let's Win Zaragoza–Anticapitalists (ZGZ)	33,423	10.08	−14.49	3	−6
We Can–Equo (Podemos–Equo)	20,551	6.20	New	2	+2
Vox (Vox)	20,458	6.17	New	2	+2
Aragonese Union (CHA)	15,311	4.62	−2.15	0	−2
Aragonese Party (PAR)	5,608	1.69	−1.13	0	±0
Ñ Platform (PAÑ)	2,584	0.78	New	0	±0
Animalist Party Against Mistreatment of Animals (PACMA)	2,079	0.63	−0.55	0	±0
Giving More (Demos+)	782	0.24	New	0	±0
Blank Seats (EB)	768	0.23	−1.13	0	±0
Communist Party of the Workers of Spain (PCTE)	229	0.07	New	0	±0
Social Aragonese Movement (MAS)	219	0.07	New	0	±0
Spanish Phalanx of the CNSO (FE de las JONS)	212	0.06	New	0	±0
Aragonese Land (TA)	188	0.06	New	0	±0
Federation of Independents of Aragon (FIA)	184	0.06	−0.05	0	±0
Communist Party of the Peoples of Spain (PCPE)	164	0.05	−0.23	0	±0
Aragonese State (EAR)	160	0.05	−0.09	0	±0
Blank ballots	2,112	0.64	−1.25		
Total	331,472			31	±0
Valid votes	331,472	99.60	+0.56		
Invalid votes	1,342	0.40	−0.56		
Votes cast / turnout	332,814	65.81	+0.28		
Abstentions	172,942	34.19	−0.28		
Registered voters	505,756				

Popular vote
PSOE	28.00%
PP	22.04%
Cs	18.27%
ZGZ	10.08%
Podemos–Equo	6.20%
Vox	6.17%
CHA	4.62%
PAR	1.69%
Others	2.28%
Blank ballots	0.64%

Seats
PSOE	32.26%
PP	25.81%
Cs	19.35%
ZGZ	9.68%
Vox	6.45%
Podemos–Equo	6.45%

== Aftermath ==
=== Government formation ===
Investiture
Ballot →	15 June 2019	
Required majority →	16 out of 31	
Jorge Azcón (PP): • PP (8); • Cs (6); • Vox (2)	16 / 31	check
Pilar Alegría (PSOE): • PSOE (10)	10 / 31	X mark
Fernando Rivarés (Podemos–Equo): • Podemos–Equo (2)	2 / 31	X mark
Abstentions/Blank ballots: • ZGZ (3)	3 / 31	
Absentees	0 / 31	

== Bibliography ==
- Constitución Española (Constitution). Official State Gazette (in Spanish). 27 December 1978 [version as of 27 September 2011]. BOE-A-1978-31229.
- Ley 7/1985, de 2 de abril, Reguladora de las Bases del Régimen Local (Law 7/1985). Official State Gazette (in Spanish). 2 April 1985 [version as of 4 August 2018]. BOE-A-1985-5392.
- Ley Orgánica 5/1985, de 19 de junio, del Régimen Electoral General (Organic Law 5/1985). Official State Gazette (in Spanish). 19 June 1985 [version as of 6 March 2019]. BOE-A-1985-11672.
- Real Decreto 209/2019, de 1 de abril, por el que se convocan elecciones locales y a las Asambleas de Ceuta y Melilla para el 26 de mayo de 2019 (Royal Decree 209/2019). Official State Gazette (in Spanish). 1 April 2019. BOE-A-2019-4824.
