= First government of Jorge Azcón =

Government of Jorge Azcón
- Government of Aragon
- 2023–2026
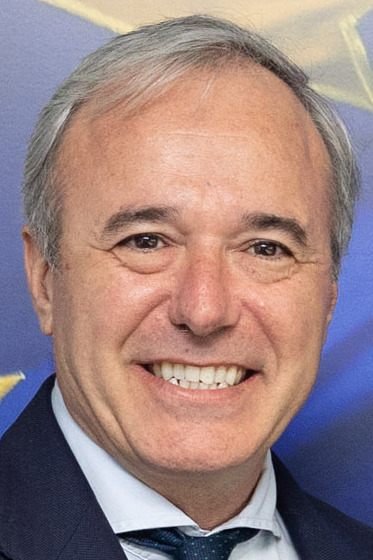
- Jorge Azcón in January 2024.
- Date formed: 12 August 2023
- Date dissolved: 4 May 2026

People and organisations
- Monarch: Felipe VI
- President: Jorge Azcón
- Vice Presidents: Alejandro Nolasco^{1st}, Mar Vaquero^{2nd} (2023–2024); Mar Vaquero (2024–2026)
- No. of ministers: 10 (Note: Does not include the President.) (2023–2024); 9 (2024–2026)
- Total no. of members: 11
- Member party: PP; Vox (2023–2024); PAR (sub-ministry level)
- Status in legislature: Majority (coalition) (2023–2024); Minority (coalition) (2024–2026)
- Opposition party: PSOE
- Opposition leader: Javier Lambán

History
- Election: 2023 regional election
- Legislature term: 11th Cortes
- Predecessor: Lambán II
- Successor: Azcón II

The first government of Jorge Azcón was formed on 12 August 2023, following the latter's election as President of the Government of Aragon by the Cortes of Aragon on 10 August and his swearing-in on 11 August, as a result of the People's Party (PP) and Vox being able to muster a majority of seats in the Cortes following the 2023 regional election. It succeeded the second Lambán government and was the Government of Aragon from 12 August 2023 to 4 May 2026, a total of 996 days, or 2 years, 8 months and 22 days.

Until 2024, the cabinet comprised members of the PP, Vox—at the sub-ministry level—the Aragonese Party (PAR), as well as a number of independents proposed by the first two parties. On 11 July 2024, Vox leader Santiago Abascal forced the break up of all PP–Vox governments at the regional level over a national controversy regarding the distribution of unaccompanied migrant minors among the autonomous communities.

== Investiture ==
Investiture; Nomination of Jorge Azcón (PP)
Ballot →	10 August 2023
Required majority →	34 out of 67
Yes: • PP (28); • Vox (7); • PAR (1)	36 / 67
No: • PSOE (23); • CHA (3); • Existe (3); • Podemos (1); • IU (1)	31 / 67
Abstentions	0 / 67
Absentees	0 / 67

== Cabinet changes ==
Azcón's government saw a number of cabinet changes during its tenure:

- On 11 July 2024, Vox leader Santiago Abascal announced that his party was breaking all of its regional governments with the People's Party (PP) as a result of the later agreeing to a nationwide distribution of unaccompanied migrant minors among the autonomous communities under its control.

== Council of Government ==
The Council of Government was structured into the offices for the president, the two vice presidents, 10 ministries and the post of spokesperson of the Government. From July 2024, the Council was reduced to nine ministries and would include only one vice president.

← Azcón I Government → (11 August 2023 – 4 May 2026)
Portfolio	Name	Party	Took office	Left office	Ref.
President	Jorge Azcón	PP	11 August 2023	30 April 2026	
First Vice President; Minister of Territorial Development, Depopulation and Justice	Alejandro Nolasco	Vox	12 August 2023	12 July 2024	
Second Vice President; Minister of Economy, Employment and Industry; Spokesperson of the Government	Mar Vaquero	PP	12 August 2023	12 July 2024	
Minister of the Presidency, Interior and Culture	Tomasa Hernández	Independent	12 August 2023	12 July 2024	
Minister of Finance and Public Administration	Roberto Bermúdez de Castro	PP	12 August 2023	12 July 2024	
Minister of Development, Housing, Mobility and Logistics	Octavio López	PP	12 August 2023	12 July 2024	
Minister of Agriculture, Livestock and Food	Ángel Samper	Independent	12 August 2023	12 July 2024	
Minister of Environment and Tourism	Manuel Blasco Marqués	PP	12 August 2023	4 May 2026	
Minister of Education, Science and Universities	Claudia Pérez Forniés	Independent	12 August 2023	12 July 2024	
Minister of Health	José Luis Bancalero	Independent	12 August 2023	4 May 2026	
Minister of Social Welfare and Family	Carmen María Susín	PP	12 August 2023	4 May 2026	
=== Changes July 2024 ===
Portfolio	Name	Party	Took office	Left office	Ref.
~~Minister of Territorial Development, Depopulation and Justice~~ (Note: On 12 July 2024, the ministries of the Presidency, Interior and Culture, Finance and Public Administration, Development, Housing, Mobility and Logistics and Education, Science and Universities were reorganized as the Presidency, Economy and Justice, Finance, Interior and Public Administration, Development, Housing, Logistics and Territorial Cohesion, Education, Culture and Sports and Employment, Science and Universities departments, respectively. Concurrently, the Territorial Development, Depopulation and Justice department was disestablished, whereas the second vice president was promoted to the post of sole vice president.)	Disestablished on 12 July 2024.				
Vice President; Minister of the Presidency, Economy and Justice; Spokesperson of the Government	Mar Vaquero	PP	12 July 2024	4 May 2026	
Minister of Finance, Interior and Public Administration	Roberto Bermúdez de Castro	PP	12 July 2024	4 May 2026	
Minister of Development, Housing, Logistics and Territorial Cohesion	Octavio López	PP	12 July 2024	4 May 2026	
Minister of Agriculture, Livestock and Food	Javier Rincón	PP	12 July 2024	4 May 2026	
Minister of Education, Culture and Sports	Tomasa Hernández	Independent	12 July 2024	4 May 2026	
Minister of Employment, Science and Universities	Claudia Pérez Forniés	Independent	12 July 2024	4 May 2026	

== Notes ==
Preceded by Lambán II	Government of Aragon; 2023–2026	Succeeded by Azcón II
