= Puyalón de Cuchas =

- Spokesperson: Zésar Corella
- Founded: 2008
- Dissolved: July 13, 2026
- Split from: Chunta Aragonesista
- Merged into: Chunta Aragonesista
- Headquarters: Zaragoza
- Newspaper: Socialismo aragonés
- Student wing: SEIRA
- Youth wing: Purna
- Ideology: Aragonese nationalism Eco-socialism; Left-wing nationalism Aragonese independence Feminism; Euroscepticism; Antifascism
- Political position: Left-wing
- National affiliation: Ahora Repúblicas (2019–2024)
- Regional affiliation: Zaragoza en Común (2015–2019)
- Trade union affiliation: Sindicato Obrero Aragonés (SOA-STA)
- Colors: Yellow; Red

Website
- puyalon.org

Puyalón de Cuchas (or simply Puyalón) was an Aragonese left-wing nationalist political party formed in 2008, after a split from the Chunta Aragonesista. The party was reintegrated with Chunta in July 2026.

== Objectives ==
The main objectives of Puyalón are achieving full national sovereignty for Aragón and building a socialist society. The party also supports the minority languages of Aragón: Catalan and Aragonese, feminism, ecologism and the integration of immigrants.

== History ==
The first participation by Puyalón in elections was in the local elections of 2011, when the party gained a town councillor in Artieda. In the European elections of 2014 Puyalón supported (and participated in) The Peoples Decide (LPD), gaining 1,241 votes (0.27% of the vote in Aragón). In the municipal elections of 2015 Puyalón gained two town councillors, one in Artieda (Raúl Ramón Iguácel) and another in Pastriz (Rubén Ramos, elected in the list Ganar Pastriz).

In the 2019 Spanish general election Puyalón won 835 votes (0.11% in Aragon), fielding candidates in all three Aragonese constituencies: Huesca (148 votes, 0.12%), Teruel (66 votes, 0.08%) and Zaragoza (621 votes, 0.11%). In the 2019 European parliament election in Spain, Puyalón supported the Republics Now coalition, the successor of the 2014 LPD coalition. Republics Now won 1,805 votes (0.27%) in Aragon.

On 25 May 2023, the party announced it would not contest the 2023 Spanish general election.

On 13 July 2026, the party announced that it would merge back into Chunta Aragonesista, from which Puyalón had originally split 18 years prior. The agreement between the parties was motivated by a desire to set aside their differences for the sake of a common cause, with the parties declaring their hope that the new pact would help "reactivate [old] networks, attract new sectors of society and strengthen the social base of left-wing Aragonese nationalism, particularly among those who never felt they could identify with traditional party structures".
