= Javier Sada =

Spanish doctor & politician (born 1956)

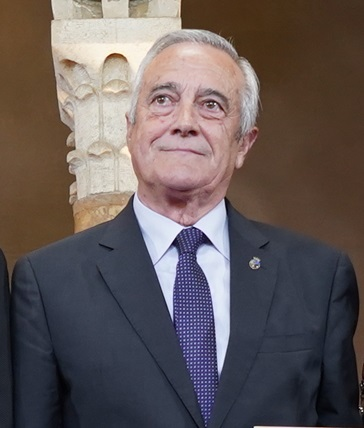

José Javier Sada Beltrán (born 2 April 1956) is a Spanish former doctor and politician. As a member of the Spanish Socialist Workers' Party (PSOE), he was a deputy in the Cortes of Aragon from 2003 to 2023, and the legislature's president (speaker) from 2019 to 2023.

== Biography ==
Sada was born in Zaragoza and graduated with a medical degree. He was manager of the Provincial Hospital of Zaragoza, director of social welfare for the Provincial Deputation of Zaragoza, and director of the Psychiatric Centre in Calatayud. He was mayor of Ateca in the Province of Zaragoza from 1991 to 2011.

Sada was first elected to the Cortes of Aragon in 2003, and became his party's spokesperson in the assembly in 2011. After the 2019 election, he was elected president of the Cortes (speaker) as the only candidate; the parties of the left and the Aragonese Party (PAR) voted in his favour and the People's Party (PP), Citizens and Vox abstained. Though the legislature contained eight parliamentary factions, Sada reflected after his retirement that moderating debate was not that difficult.

At the end of March 2023, Sada bid farewell to the Cortes of Aragon, ahead of elections in May. He was on his party's electoral list in the Zaragoza constituency, but in the symbolic last place, which would require a hegemonic victory for him to be re-elected.
