= Zaragoza en Común =

Zaragoza in Common Zaragoza en Común
- Founded: 2015
- Ideology: Localism; Left-wing populism Participatory democracy
- Political position: Left-wing
- City Council: 2 / 31

Website
- zaragozaencomun.com

Zaragoza en Común (Spanish for Zaragoza in Common, ZeC) is a municipalist movement aimed at "creating, from the confluence of people and political and social organizations, a new social majority to win the city for the people".

It was created in 2015, to contest the 2015 local elections in the city of Zaragoza. In these elections, Zaragoza en Común won 24.6% of the vote (representing the second largest share) and 9 members in the city council. Its leader Pedro Santisteve was elected mayor of Zaragoza on June 13, 2015 with the votes of ZGZ, the Spanish Socialist Workers' Party (PSOE) and the regionalist Chunta Aragonesista.

In the elections on May 26, 2019, ZGZ received only 10% of the votes and lost 6 of their 9 seats in the council and the candidate of the conservative People's Party was elected by the council in June.

== Composition ==
Party	Notes
United Left of Aragon (IU-A)	
Anti-capitalists Aragon (Anticapitalistas)	Joined in 2020, left in 2022
Equo Aragon (EQUO)	Left in 2019
Puyalón de Cuchas (Puyalón)	Left in 2019.
Podemos	Left in 2019.

== Electoral results ==
Zaragoza City Council
Election	Votes	%	Seats won
2015	80,055	24.6 (#2)	9 / 31
2019	33,005	10.0 (#4)	3 / 31
2023	19,381	5.84 (#4)	2 / 31
