= Jorge Azcón =

Spanish politician (born 1973)

The Most Excellent Jorge Azcón
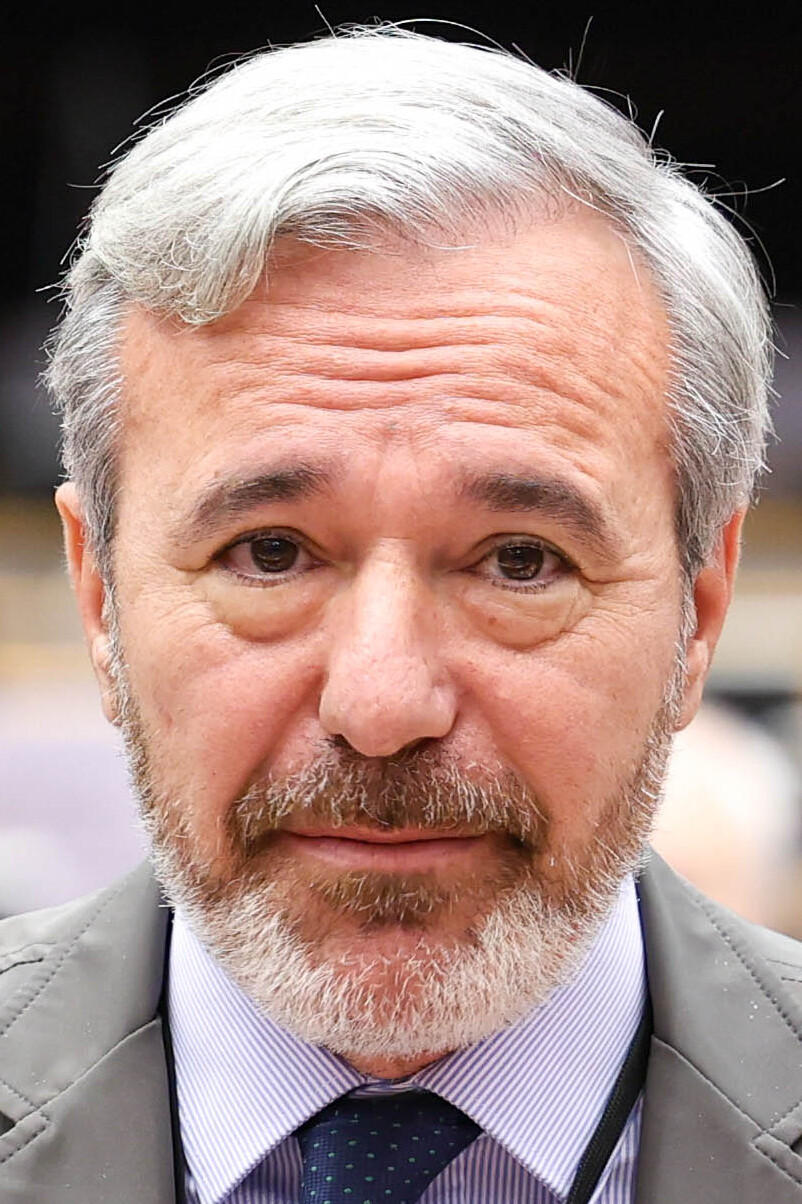

President of the Government of Aragon
- Incumbent
- Assumed office 11 August 2023
- Vice President: Alejandro Nolasco; Mar Vaquero
- Preceded by: Javier Lambán

Member of the Cortes of Aragon
- Incumbent
- Assumed office 23 June 2023
- Constituency: Zaragoza

Mayor of Zaragoza
- In office 15 June 2019 – 16 June 2023
- Preceded by: Pedro Santisteve
- Succeeded by: Natalia Chueca

President of the People's Party of Aragon
- Incumbent
- Assumed office 19 December 2021
- Preceded by: Luis María Beamonte

City councillor of Zaragoza
- In office 11 June 2011 – 17 June 2023
- In office 8 April 2000 – 16 June 2007

Personal details
- Born: Jorge Antonio Azcón Navarro; 21 November 1973 (age 52) Zaragoza, Spain
- Party: People's Party
- Parent: Julio Azcón (father)
- Education: University of Zaragoza
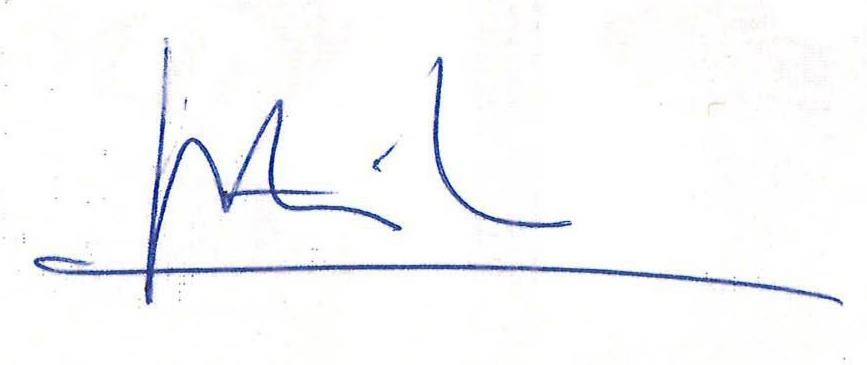
- Signature

Jorge Antonio Azcón Navarro (Spanish: [ˈxoɾxe anˈtonjo aθˈkon naˈβaro]; born 21 November 1973) is a Spanish politician, serving as the President of the Government of Aragon since 2023. He is the president of the People's Party of Aragon. He was also a city councillor (2000–2007; 2011–2023) and the mayor (2019–2023) of Zaragoza.

== Early and personal life ==
Born in Zaragoza, Azcón is the youngest of five siblings. The eldest, Quino, was his hero and died of an illness.

As of 2023, Azcón is married and has two children. His father Julio (1931–2022) played football for Real Zaragoza in the 1950s and later set up a construction business.

Azcón graduated in Law from the University of Zaragoza, where he also obtained a master's degree in Urban Planning. He then worked for MRA, a business involved in subsidised housing.

== Political career ==
=== Early local career (2000–2019) ===
Azcón joined the People's Party in 1993. He was the leader of the New Generations of the People's Party in the Province of Zaragoza and the region of Aragon.

In 2000, Luisa Fernanda Rudi resigned as mayor of Zaragoza to be President of the Congress of Deputies, and she was succeeded by José Atarés, who brought Azcón into his cabinet. When Atarés was mayor from 2000 to 2003, Azcón was the councillor in charge of young people, and subsequently he was the party's assistant spokesman when they were in opposition to Juan Alberto Belloch. Before the 2003 Zaragoza City Council election, Atarés sent Azcón, who was not yet 30, to debate on television against Belloch.

Ahead of the 2007 Zaragoza City Council election, new lead candidate Domingo Buesa Conde removed Azcón and two other serving councillors from his list. Azcón returned to working at MRA.

Azcón returned to politics in July 2010, when Luisa Fernanda Rudi, president of the People's Party of Aragon, named him as one of four coordinators of the party in Zaragoza. For the 2011 Zaragoza City Council election, he was fifth on the PP list led by Eloy Suárez. Four years later, he was second on the list. In February 2016, when Suárez left the city hall to centre his work on the Congress of Deputies, the party unanimously chose Azcón to be the new spokesman.

=== Mayor of Zaragoza (2019–2023) ===
In the 2019 Zaragoza election, the Spanish Socialist Workers' Party (PSOE) led by Pilar Alegría was the party that obtained the most seats, though the People's Party could gain the majority in alliance with fellow centre-right party Citizens. With the votes of his party (8), Citizens (6) and Vox (2) he was invested as the city's first non-left-wing mayor in 16 years.

Among Azcón's projects for Zaragoza is "El Bosque de los Zaragozanos", a plan to create a forest of 700,000 trees. The project received €400,000 from energy company Repsol in 2021.

In July 2021, Azcón led the city council in displaying a banner with the rainbow and transgender flags from the city hall balcony. A judge ordered its removal, citing a 2020 Supreme Court judgement that public buildings cannot fly unofficial flags at any time, for reasons of neutrality.

In August 2021, as spokesman of the Spanish Federation of Municipalities and Provinces (FEMP), Azcón led several PP mayors in criticising the PSOE-led national government whom he accused of lying over investment in municipalities during the COVID-19 pandemic.

=== President of the Government of Aragon (2023–) ===
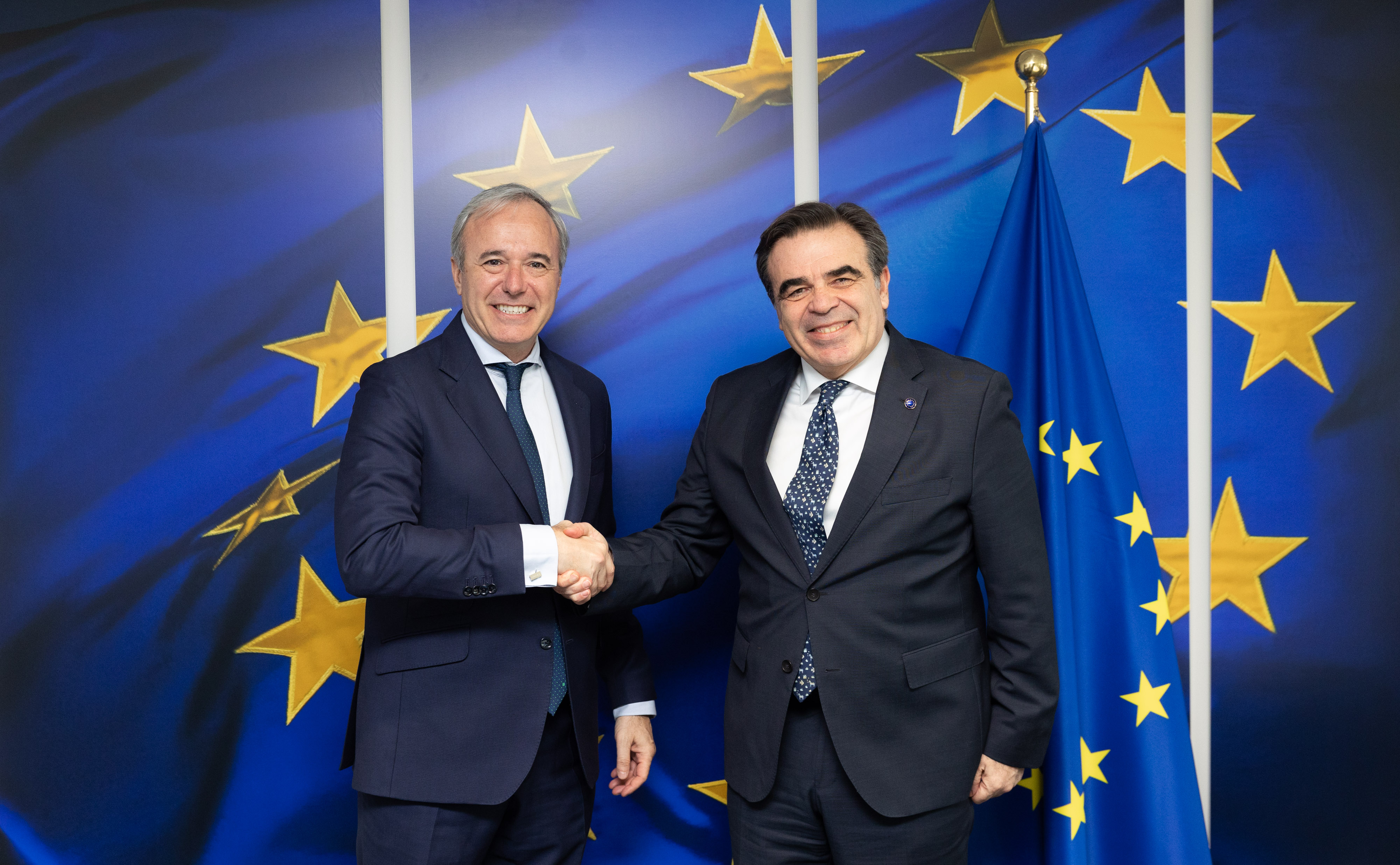
Azcón (left) meeting Margaritis Schinas at the European Commission in January 2024

Azcón was housebound for two weeks in January 2021 after contracting COVID-19. In December that year he was chosen as the PP's lead candidate for the 2023 Aragonese regional election, replacing Luis María Beamonte. He led the party to first place, up 12 seats to 28.

After being sworn in as President he formed the Azcón government, in coalition with the seven deputies from Vox and the one from the Aragonese Party (PAR). The coalition between Vox and PP was signed with 80 points, including removing "ideology" from education, repealing the regional Historical Memory Law and modifying the regional law on transgender rights, combating violence within the family and against women, and reversing depopulation.

In July 2024, Vox pulled out of the government, due to party leader and regional vice president Alejandro Nolasco disagreeing with the accommodation of unaccompanied migrant children (known in Spain by the acronym mena; Menor extranjero no acompañado). Azcón said that he would not call a snap election and would instead govern in a PP-only minority government.

On 15 December 2025, following the failure to pass the budget due to opposition from Vox, Azcón announced an election for 8 February. His party again took the most seats, but two fewer than in 2023, while Vox doubled its seats and would become essential for him to govern with a majority.

On 29 April 2026, Azcón was re-elected as regional president after reaching a new coalition agreement with Vox.
