= Government of Aragon =

Government of the Spanish autonomous region of Aragon

- Gobierno de Aragón

Overview
- Polity: Aragon
- Leader: President
- Appointed by: King of Spain
- Responsible to: Cortes of Aragon
- Headquarters: Royal House of Mercy, Zaragoza
- Website: www.aragon.es

The Government of Aragon or Diputación General de Aragón (officially, in Spanish) is the executive power of the autonomous community of Aragon, in Spain. It is headed by the President of the Government of Aragon. Its main headquarters is located in the Royal House of Mercy in Zaragoza, a building also called El Pignatelli. The government exists since 1978. It has its historical origin in the Diputación del General del Reino de Aragón, in force between 1364 and 1708, and whose origin is in the Cortes of 1188.
