= List of permanent delegates of Spain to UNESCO =

Spain's ambassador to UNESCO

Ambassador Permanent Delegate of Spain to UNESCO
- Coat of arms of Spain

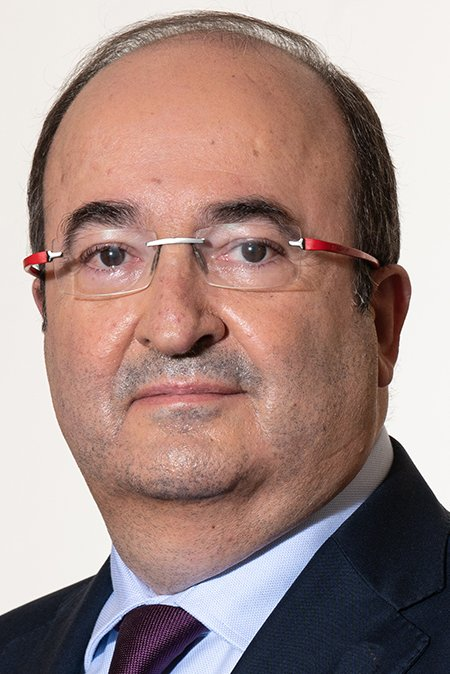
- Incumbent; Miquel Iceta since 6 December 2023
- Ministry of Foreign Affairs; Secretariat of State for Foreign Affairs
- Style: The Most Excellent
- Residence: Paris, France
- Nominator: The Foreign Minister
- Appointer: The Monarch
- Formation: 1954
- Deputy: Deputy Permanent Delegate
- Website: Permanent Delegation of Spain to UNESCO

The ambassador permanent delegate of Spain to UNESCO is the official representative of the Kingdom of Spain to the United Nations Educational, Scientific and Cultural Organization (UNESCO).

Spain was admitted to UNESCO at the seventh General Conference of the United Nations Educational, Scientific and Cultural Organisation, held in December 1952, and officially joined on 30 January 1953. In April that year, the Spanish government established the Spanish National Commission for UNESCO, headed by Pedro Laín Entralgo. Spain sent its first delegation to the eight General Conference, held in Montevideo, in November 1954.

Since December 1956, the delegate has been appointed in permanent basis and, since June 1972, it has the rank of ambassador. The current ambassador-delegate is Miquel Iceta, former minister of Culture and Sport.

== Permanent Delegation ==
As of July 2026, the Permanente Delegation is integrated by:

- The Permanent Delegate, with the rank of Ambassador Extraordinary and Plenipotentiary.
- The Deputy Permanent Delegate.
- The Education Office. Established in 1987, it is composed by Counsellors and Attachés, all of them appointed by the minister of education. They represent Spain before the relevant UNESCO forums about education, and it also represents Spanish interets in this area before the OECD and the Council of Europe.
- A Counsellor appointed by the minister of the interior.

They are assisted by contract staff, attachés and a Chancellery.

== List of delegates ==
Delegate		Term	
Delegate		Start	End
Joaquín Ruiz-Giménez (Note: Minister of National Education)		8th General Conference (1954)	
The Marquess of Saavedra (Note: He replaced the minister after he had to return prematurely to Madrid.)		8th General Conference (1954)	
Segismundo Royo-Villanova		9th General Conference (1956)	
Permanent Delegate
1	Federico Díez y de Ysasi	31 December 1956	25 January 1962
2	Pedro Ortiz-Armengol	25 January 1962	1 April 1967
3	Emilio Garrigues y Díaz-Cañabate	1 April 1967	24 March 1973
4	Raimundo Pérez-Hernández y Moreno	24 March 1973	26 June 1978
5	Antonio Poch Gutiérrez de Caviedes	26 June 1978	1 March 1982
6	Juan Ignacio Tena Ybarra	1 March 1982	2 July 1983
7	Raúl Morodo	2 July 1983	7 February 1985
8	Miguel Angel Carriedo Mompín	18 February 1985	17 April 1990
9	Félix Guillermo Fernández-Shaw Baldasano	17 April 1990	23 January 1995
10	Salvador Bermúdez de Castro y Bernales	23 January 1995	26 November 1996
11	Jesús Ezquerra Calvo	26 November 1996	17 June 2000
12	Francisco Villar Ortiz de Urbina	17 June 2000	1 November 2003
13	Yago Pico de Coaña	1 November 2003	31 July 2004
14	José María Ridao	31 July 2004	29 July 2006
15	María Jesús San Segundo	29 July 2006	16 November 2010
16	Ion de la Riva	16 November 2010	10 March 2012
17	Juan Manuel de Barandica y Luxán	26 May 2012	1 August 2015
18	María Teresa Lizaranzu Perinat	1 August 2015	20 August 2018
19	Juan Andrés Perelló	20 August 2018	22 October 2021
20	José Manuel Rodríguez Uribes	22 October 2021	6 December 2023
21	Miquel Iceta	6 December 2023	

== See also ==
- List of World Heritage Sites in Spain
- List of Intangible Cultural Heritage elements in Spain
