= Sánchez government =

The term Sánchez government may refer to:

- First government of Pedro Sánchez, the government of Spain under Pedro Sánchez from 2018 to 2020.
- Second government of Pedro Sánchez, the government of Spain under Pedro Sánchez from 2020 to 2023.
- Third government of Pedro Sánchez, the government of Spain under Pedro Sánchez from 2023.
