= Government of Pedro Sánchez =

Government of Pedro Sánchez may refer to:

- First government of Pedro Sánchez (2018–2020)
- Second government of Pedro Sánchez (2020–2023)
- Third government of Pedro Sánchez (2023–present)
