= List of ambassadors of Spain to the Organization of American States =

Ambassador Permanent Observer of Spain to the Organization of American States
- Coat of arms of Spain

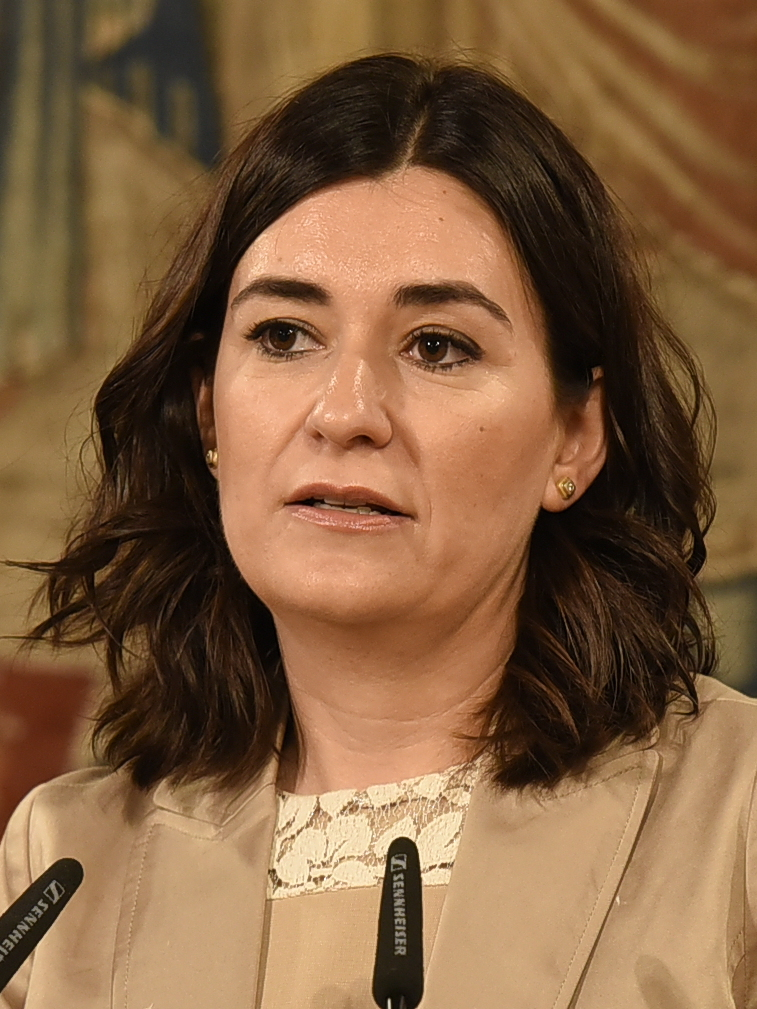
- Incumbent; Carmen Montón since 11 March 2020
- Ministry of Foreign Affairs; Secretariat of State for Ibero-America
- Style: The Most Excellent
- Residence: Washington, D.C.
- Nominator: The Foreign Minister
- Appointer: The Monarch
- Inaugural holder: Enrique Suárez de Puga
- Formation: 1972
- Website: Mission of Spain – OAS

The ambassador permanent observer of Spain to the Organization of American States is the official representative of the Kingdom of Spain to the Organization of American States (OAS). It also acts as an observer to the Inter-American Defense Board, within the OAS, and the Pan American Health Organization (PAHO).

The Mission to the OAS was established in 1972, being the first country to be given observer status. Also, since 1980 it is also accredited to the PAHO, with same status.

The current ambassador is Carmen Montón, former minister of Health.

== List of ambassadors ==
Ambassador		Term	
Ambassador		Start	End
1	Enrique Suárez de Puga	21 August 1972	6 May 1975
2	Carlos Luis de Pedroso y Frost	9 September 1975	24 July 1979
3	Eduardo de Zulueta y Dato	24 July 1979	29 June 1982
4	Leonardo Pérez Rodrigo	29 June 1982	30 August 1985
5	Alberto Aza Arias	30 August 1985	19 May 1990
6	Miguel Angel Carriedo Mompin	28 May 1990	9 January 1993
7	Mariano Berdejo Rivera	27 March 1993	1 June 1996
8	Francisco Villar Ortiz de Urbina	1 June 1996	10 June 2000
9	Eduardo Gutiérrez Sáenz de Buruaga	10 June 2000	2 October 2004
10	Juan Romero de Terreros y Castilla	2 October 2004	14 June 2008
11	Javier Sancho Velázquez	25 July 2008	11 February 2012
12	Jorge Hevia Sierra	11 February 2012	6 May 2017
13	Cristóbal Ramón Valdés y Valentín-Gamazo	6 May 2017	11 March 2020
14	Carmen Montón Giménez	11 March 2020	Incumbent
