= First government of Pedro Sánchez =

2018–2020 government of Spain

1st government of Pedro Sánchez
- Government of Spain
- 2018–2020
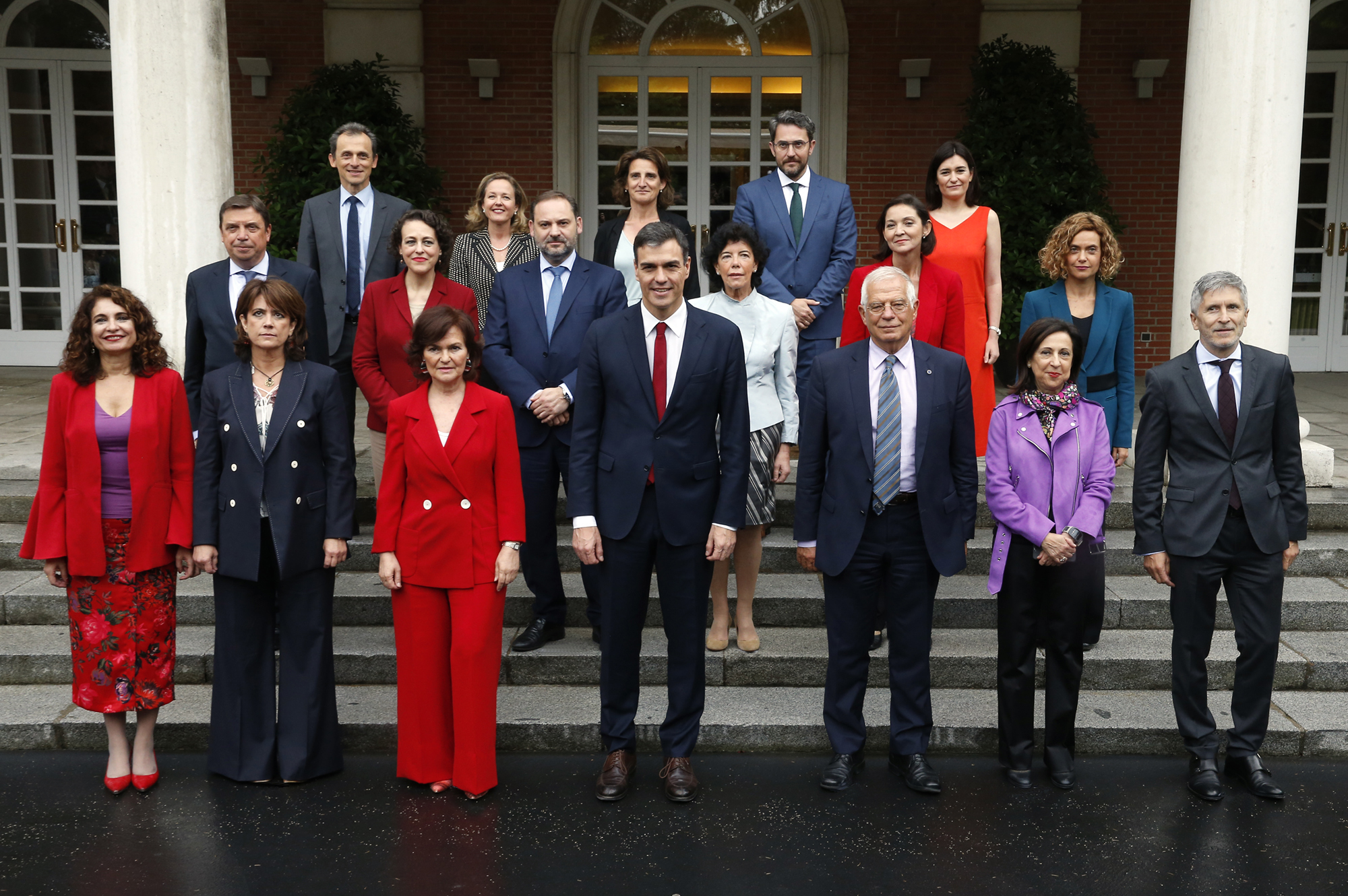
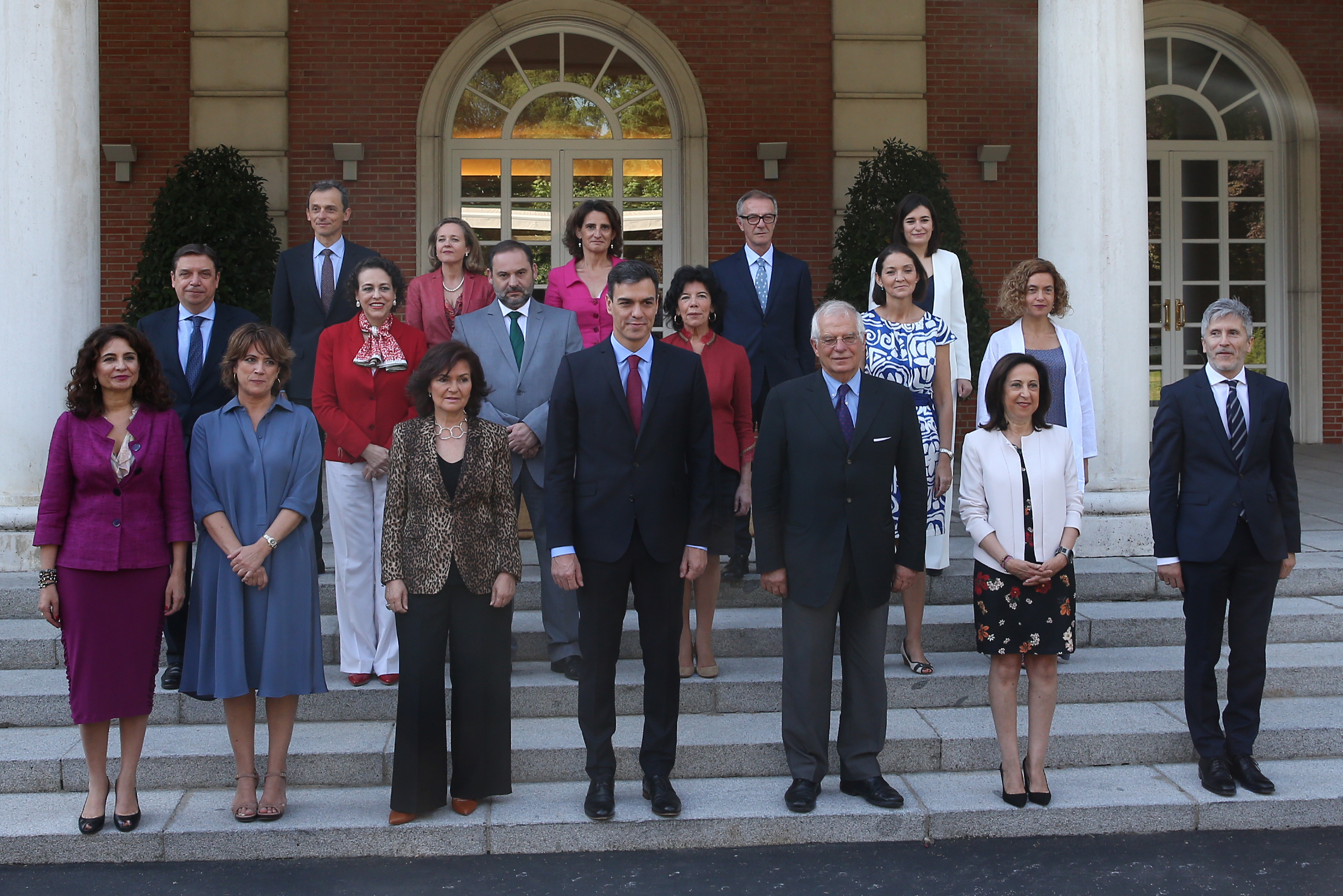
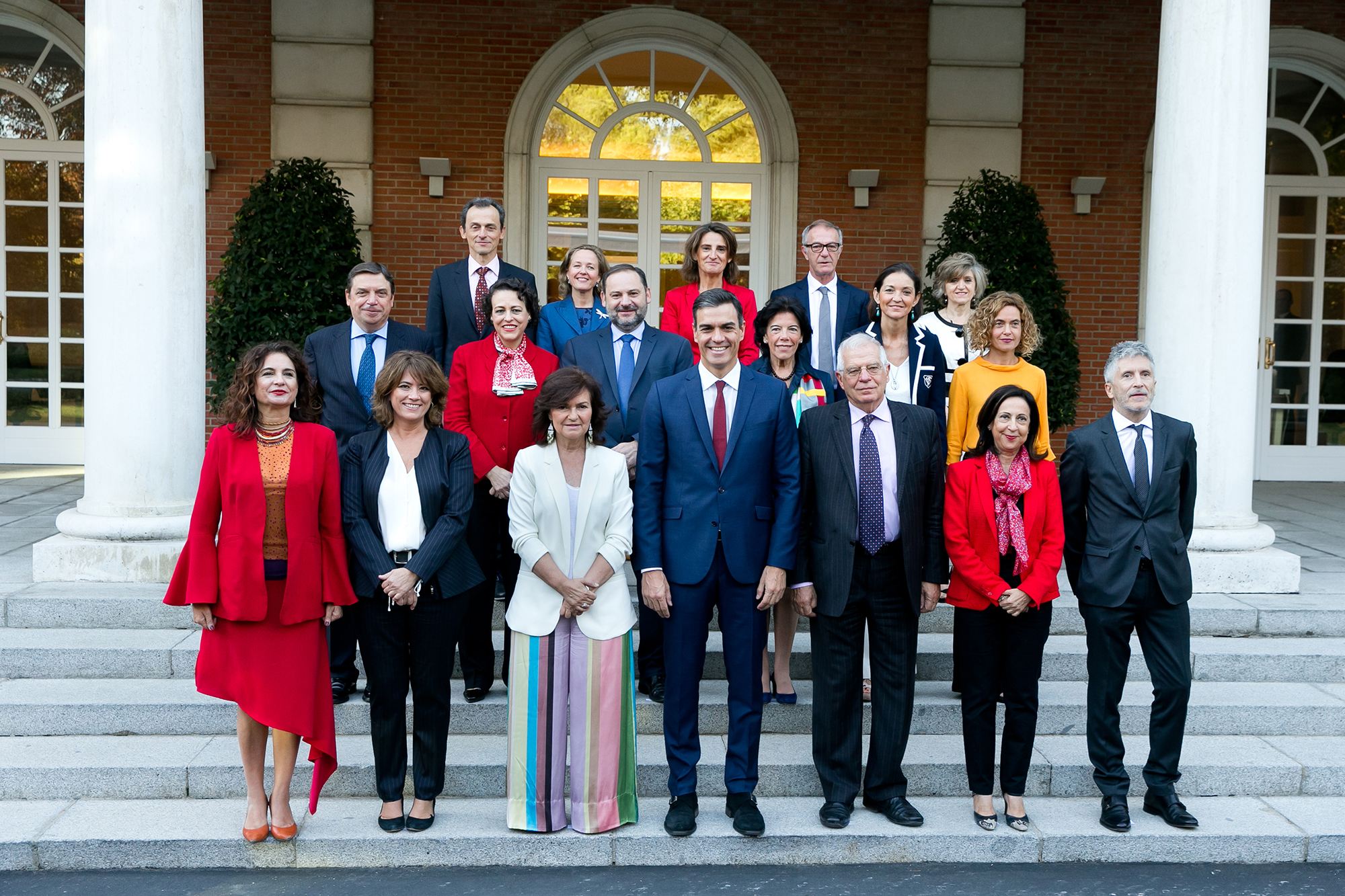
- The government in June 2018 (top left), July 2018 (top right) and October 2018 (bottom)
- Date formed: 7 June 2018
- Date dissolved: 13 January 2020

People and organisations
- Monarch: Felipe VI
- Prime Minister: Pedro Sánchez
- Deputy Prime Minister: Carmen Calvo
- No. of ministers: 17 (Note: Does not include the prime minister.)
- Total no. of members: 19
- Member party: PSOE
- Status in legislature: Minority (single-party) (2018–2019); Caretaker (2019–2020)
- Opposition party: PP
- Opposition leader: Pablo Casado

History
- Incoming formation: 2018 vote of no confidence
- Outgoing formation: 2019–2020 government formation
- Outgoing election: April 2019 general election November 2019 general election
- Legislature terms: 12th Cortes Generales; 13th Cortes Generales
- Predecessor: Rajoy II
- Successor: Sánchez II

The first government of Pedro Sánchez was formed on 7 June 2018, following the latter's election as prime minister of Spain by the Congress of Deputies on 1 June and his swearing-in on 2 June, as a result of the success of a motion of no confidence against Mariano Rajoy. It succeeded the second Rajoy government and was the government of Spain from 7 June 2018 to 13 January 2020, a total of 585 days, or 1 year, 7 months and 6 days.

The cabinet comprised members of the PSOE (including its sister party, the Socialists' Party of Catalonia, PSC) and a number of independents. It was nicknamed the "Beautiful Government" (Spanish: gobierno bonito) by the media, because its composition was purposely leaked in a slow cascade of surprise, well-received announcements in the days prior to its formation in order to heighten the positive media coverage on the new appointments. It also became the government with the most female ministers in the country's history and in the world at the time, with 11 out of 17 ministries held by women or 64.7% of the total.

The government was defeated in the parliamentary vote of the 2019 General State Budget bill, prompting Sánchez to dissolve the Cortes and call a snap election; as a result, this was the shortest government since the Spanish transition to democracy—not counting acting periods—lasting for 10 months before an election was held. It was automatically dismissed on 29 April 2019 as a consequence of the April 2019 general election, but remained in acting capacity until the next government was sworn in.

== Investiture ==
Motion of no confidence Congress of Deputies; Nomination of Pedro Sánchez (PSOE)
Ballot →	1 June 2018
Required majority →	176 out of 350
Yes: • PSOE (84); • UP–ECP–EM (67); • ERC (9); • PDeCAT (8); • PNV (5); • Compromís (4); • EH Bildu (2); • NCa (1)	180 / 350
No: • PP (134); • Cs (32); • UPN (2); • FAC (1)	169 / 350
Abstentions: • CCa (1)	1 / 350
Absentees	0 / 350

== Cabinet changes ==
Sánchez's first government saw a number of cabinet changes during its tenure:

- On 13 June 2018, Màxim Huerta stepped down as Minister of Culture and Sports after it was revealed that he had been sanctioned for using a shell corporation as a means for tax avoidance between 2006 and 2008. He was succeeded by José Guirao.
- On 11 September 2018, Carmen Montón announced her resignation as Minister of Health, Consumer Affairs and Social Welfare after evidence was uncovered that she had obtained a master's degree from the King Juan Carlos University without attending most classes, amid other irregularities. She was succeeded by María Luisa Carcedo.

From 29 April 2019, Sánchez's cabinet took on acting duties for the duration of the government formation process resulting from the April 2019 general election. This lasted for an estimated 259 days and saw a new general election being held in the meantime. A number of ministers renounced their posts throughout this period, with the ordinary duties of their ministries being transferred to other cabinet members as a result of Sánchez being unable to appoint replacements while in acting role.

- On 21 May 2019, Meritxell Batet was elected President of the Congress of Deputies of the 13th Legislature, a position incompatible with her post as acting Minister of Territorial Policy and Civil Service. Luis Planas, acting Minister of Agriculture, Fisheries and Food, took on the ordinary discharge of duties of Batet's vacant ministry.
- On 30 November 2019, Josep Borrell renounced his position as acting Minister of Foreign Affairs, European Union and Cooperation in order to become High Representative of the Union for Foreign Affairs and Security Policy in the Von der Leyen Commission. Margarita Robles, acting Minister of Defence, took on the ordinary discharge of duties of Borrell's vacant ministry.

== Council of Ministers ==
The Council of Ministers was structured into the offices for the prime minister, the deputy prime minister, 17 ministries and the post of the spokesperson of the Government.

← Sánchez I Government → (7 June 2018 – 13 January 2020)
Portfolio	Name	Party	Took office	Left office	Ref.
Prime Minister	Pedro Sánchez	PSOE	2 June 2018	8 January 2020	
Deputy Prime Minister; Minister of the Presidency, Relations with the Cortes and Equality	Carmen Calvo	PSOE	7 June 2018	13 January 2020	
Minister of Foreign Affairs, European Union and Cooperation	Josep Borrell	PSOE	7 June 2018	30 November 2019	
Minister of Justice	Dolores Delgado	Independent	7 June 2018	13 January 2020	
Minister of Defence	Margarita Robles	Independent	7 June 2018	13 January 2020	
Minister of Finance	María Jesús Montero	PSOE	7 June 2018	13 January 2020	
Minister of the Interior	Fernando Grande-Marlaska	Independent	7 June 2018	13 January 2020	
Minister of Development	José Luis Ábalos	PSOE	7 June 2018	13 January 2020	
Minister of Education and Vocational Training; Spokesperson of the Government	Isabel Celaá	PSOE	7 June 2018	13 January 2020	
Minister of Labour, Migration and Social Security	Magdalena Valerio	PSOE	7 June 2018	13 January 2020	
Minister of Industry, Trade and Tourism	Reyes Maroto	PSOE	7 June 2018	13 January 2020	
Minister of Agriculture, Fisheries and Food	Luis Planas	PSOE	7 June 2018	13 January 2020	
Minister of Territorial Policy and Civil Service	Meritxell Batet	PSOE^{/PSC}	7 June 2018	20 May 2019	
Minister for the Ecological Transition	Teresa Ribera	PSOE	7 June 2018	13 January 2020	
Minister of Culture and Sports	Màxim Huerta	Independent	7 June 2018	13 June 2018	
Minister of Economy and Enterprise	Nadia Calviño	Independent	7 June 2018	13 January 2020	
Minister of Health, Consumer Affairs and Social Welfare	Carmen Montón	PSOE	7 June 2018	11 September 2018	
Minister of Science, Innovation and Universities	Pedro Duque	Independent	7 June 2018	13 January 2020	
=== Changes June 2018 ===
Portfolio	Name	Party	Took office	Left office	Ref.
Minister of Culture and Sports	José Guirao	Independent	14 June 2018	13 January 2020	
=== Changes September 2018 ===
Portfolio	Name	Party	Took office	Left office	Ref.
Minister of Health, Consumer Affairs and Social Welfare	María Luisa Carcedo	PSOE	12 September 2018	13 January 2020	
=== Changes 2019 ===
Portfolio	Name	Party	Took office	Left office	Ref.
Minister of Territorial Policy and Civil Service	Luis Planas took on the ordinary discharge of duties from 20 May 2019 to 13 January 2020.				
Minister of Foreign Affairs, European Union and Cooperation	Margarita Robles took on the ordinary discharge of duties from 30 November 2019 to 13 January 2020.				

== Departmental structure ==
Pedro Sánchez's first government was organised into several superior and governing units, whose number, powers and hierarchical structure varied depending on the ministerial department.

Unit/body rank

- (■) Secretary of state
- (■) Undersecretary
- (■) Director-general
- (●) Autonomous agency
- (◆) Military & intelligence agency

Office (Original name)	Portrait	Name	Took office	Left office	Alliance/party	Ref.
=== Prime Minister's Office ===
Prime Minister (Presidencia del Gobierno)		Pedro Sánchez	2 June 2018	8 January 2020	PSOE	
Prime Minister (Presidencia del Gobierno)	19 June 2018 – 28 January 2020: (■) Cabinet of the Prime Minister's Office–Chief of Staff; (■) Deputy Chief of Staff; (■) Department of National Affairs; (■) Department of Economic Affairs; (■) Directorate for Institutional Affairs; (■) General Secretariat of the Prime Minister's Office; (■) Deputy General Secretariat; (■) Department of Protocol; (■) Department of Security; (■) General Secretariat for International Affairs, European Union, G20 and Global Security; (■) Department of International Affairs and Global Security; (■) Department of European Affairs and G20; (■) Directorate for Analysis and Studies; (■) Department of National Security; (■) State Secretariat for Press; (■) Directorate-General for National Information; (■) Directorate-General for Communication; (■) Directorate-General for International Information; (■) High Commissioner for the Fight against Child Poverty; (■) Directorate of the Office of the High Commissioner for the Fight against Child Poverty; (■) High Commissioner for the 2030 Agenda; (■) Directorate of the Office of the High Commissioner for the 2030 Agenda					
Deputy Prime Minister (Vicepresidencia del Gobierno)		Carmen Calvo	7 June 2018	13 January 2020	PSOE	
Deputy Prime Minister (Vicepresidencia del Gobierno)	See Ministry of the Presidency, Relations with the Cortes and Equality					
=== Ministry of Foreign Affairs, European Union and Cooperation ===
Ministry of Foreign Affairs, European Union and Cooperation (Ministerio de Asuntos Exteriores, Unión Europea y Cooperación)		Josep Borrell	7 June 2018	30 November 2019 (renounced)	PSOE	
Ministry of Foreign Affairs, European Union and Cooperation (Ministerio de Asuntos Exteriores, Unión Europea y Cooperación)		Margarita Robles (ordinary discharge of duties)	30 November 2019	13 January 2020	PSOE (Independent)	
Ministry of Foreign Affairs, European Union and Cooperation (Ministerio de Asuntos Exteriores, Unión Europea y Cooperación)	23 June 2018 – 29 January 2020: (■) State Secretariat for Foreign Affairs; (■) Directorate-General for Foreign Policy and Security; (■) Directorate-General for the United Nations and Human Rights; (■) Directorate-General for the Maghreb, the Mediterranean and the Middle East; (■) Directorate-General for Africa; (■) Directorate-General for North America, Eastern Europe, Asia and the Pacific; (■) Directorate-General for International Economic Relations; (■) State Secretariat for the European Union; (■) Directorate-General for Integration and Coordination of General Affairs of the European Union; (■) Directorate-General for Coordination of the Internal Market and other European Union Policies; (■) Directorate-General for Western, Central and South East Europe; (■) State Secretariat for International Cooperation and for Ibero-America and the Caribbean; (■) Directorate-General for Sustainable Development Policies; (■) Directorate-General for Ibero-America and the Caribbean; (■) State Secretariat for Global Spain (est. 12 Oct 2018); (■) Global Spain Office (est. 12 Oct 2018); (■) Undersecretariat of Foreign Affairs, European Union and Cooperation; (■) Technical General Secretariat; (■) Directorate-General for the Foreign Service; (■) Directorate-General for Spaniards Abroad and Consular and Migratory Affairs (disest. 12 Oct 2018); (■) Directorate-General for Spaniards Abroad and Consular Affairs (est. 12 Oct 2018); (■) Directorate-General for Diplomatic Communication and Information; (■) Introducer of Ambassadors					
=== Ministry of Justice ===
Ministry of Justice (Ministerio de Justicia)		Dolores Delgado	7 June 2018	13 January 2020	PSOE (Independent)	
Ministry of Justice (Ministerio de Justicia)	23 June 2018 – 29 January 2020: (■) State Secretariat for Justice; (■) General Secretariat for the Administration of Justice; (■) Directorate-General for Relations with the Administration of Justice; (■) Directorate-General for Modernization of Justice, Technological Development and Asset Recovery and Management (from 26 Aug 2018); (■) Directorate-General for Modernization of Justice, Technological Development and Asset Recovery and Management (until 26 Aug 2018); (■) Directorate-General for International Legal Cooperation and Relations with Religions (disest. 26 Aug 2018); (■) Directorate-General for International Legal Cooperation, Relations with Religions and Human Rights (est. 26 Aug 2018); (■) Undersecretariat of Justice; (■) Technical General Secretariat; (■) Directorate-General for Registries and Notaries; (■) Directorate-General for Historical Memory (est. 30 Jun 2018); (■) Office of the Solicitor General of the State–Directorate of the State Legal Service					
=== Ministry of Defence ===
Ministry of Defence (Ministerio de Defensa)		Margarita Robles	7 June 2018	13 January 2020	PSOE (Independent)	
Ministry of Defence (Ministerio de Defensa)	23 June 2018 – 29 January 2020: (■) State Secretariat for Defence; (■) Directorate-General for Armament and Materiel; (■) Directorate-General for Economic Affairs; (■) Directorate-General for Infrastructure; (■) Undersecretariat of Defence; (■) Technical General Secretariat; (■) Directorate-General for Personnel; (■) Directorate-General for Military Recruitment and Teaching; (■) General Secretariat for Defence Policy; (■) Directorate-General for Defence Policy; (◆) Armed Forces; (■) Defence Staff–Chief of the Defence Staff; (■) Army–Chief of Staff of the Army; (■) Navy–Chief of Staff of the Navy; (■) Air Force–Chief of Staff of the Air Force; (◆) National Intelligence Centre; (■) State Secretariat–Directorate of the National Intelligence Centre; (■) General Secretariat of the National Intelligence Centre; (■) Technical Directorate for Resources; (■) Technical Directorate for Intelligence; (■) Technical Directorate for Intelligence Support					
=== Ministry of Finance ===
Ministry of Finance (Ministerio de Hacienda)		María Jesús Montero	7 June 2018	13 January 2020	PSOE	
Ministry of Finance (Ministerio de Hacienda)	23 June 2018 – 29 January 2020: (■) State Secretariat for Finance; (■) General Secretariat for Regional and Local Financing; (■) Directorate-General for Taxes; (■) Directorate-General for the Cadastre; (■) Central Economic-Administrative Court; (■) Directorate-General for the Regulation of Gambling; (■) State Secretariat for Budgets and Expenditure; (■) Directorate-General for Budgets; (■) Directorate-General for Personnel Costs and Public Pensions; (■) Directorate-General for European Funds; (■) Undersecretariat of Finance; (■) Office of the Comptroller General of the State Administration; (■) Technical General Secretariat; (■) Directorate-General for the State Heritage; (■) Inspectorate-General; (■) Directorate-General for Rationalization and Centralization of Contracting					
=== Ministry of the Interior ===
Ministry of the Interior (Ministerio del Interior)		Fernando Grande-Marlaska	7 June 2018	13 January 2020	PSOE (Independent)	
Ministry of the Interior (Ministerio del Interior)	23 June 2018 – 29 January 2020: (■) State Secretariat for Security; (■) Directorate-General of the Police; (■) Directorate-General of the Civil Guard; (■) General Secretariat for Penitentiary Institutions; (■) Directorate-General for Criminal Enforcement and Social Reintegration; (■) Directorate-General for International Relations and Foreigners; (■) Undersecretariat of the Interior; (■) Technical General Secretariat; (■) Directorate-General for Internal Policy; (■) Directorate-General for Traffic; (■) Directorate-General for Civil Protection and Emergencies; (■) Directorate-General for Support to Victims of Terrorism					
=== Ministry of Development ===
Ministry of Development (Ministerio de Fomento)		José Luis Ábalos	7 June 2018	13 January 2020	PSOE	
Ministry of Development (Ministerio de Fomento)	23 June 2018 – 29 January 2020: (■) State Secretariat for Infrastructure, Transport and Housing; (■) General Secretariat for Infrastructure; (■) Directorate-General for Roads; (■) General Secretariat for Transport; (■) Directorate-General for Civil Aviation; (■) Directorate-General for the Merchant Marine; (■) Directorate-General for Land Transport; (■) General Secretariat for Housing; (■) Directorate-General for Architecture, Housing and Soil; (■) Undersecretariat of Development; (■) Technical General Secretariat; (■) Directorate-General for Economic Programming and Budgets; (■) Directorate-General for Organization and Inspection; (■) Directorate-General for the National Geographic Institute					
=== Ministry of Education and Vocational Training ===
Ministry of Education and Vocational Training (Ministerio de Educación y Formación Profesional)		Isabel Celaá	7 June 2018	13 January 2020	PSOE	
Ministry of Education and Vocational Training (Ministerio de Educación y Formación Profesional)	23 June 2018 – 29 January 2020: (■) State Secretariat for Education and Vocational Training; (■) Directorate-General for Evaluation and Territorial Cooperation; (■) Directorate-General for Vocational Training; (■) Directorate-General for Educational Planning and Management; (■) Undersecretariat of Education and Vocational Training; (■) Technical General Secretariat					
=== Ministry of Labour, Migration and Social Security ===
Ministry of Labour, Migration and Social Security (Ministerio de Trabajo, Migraciones y Seguridad Social)		Magdalena Valerio	7 June 2018	13 January 2020	PSOE	
Ministry of Labour, Migration and Social Security (Ministerio de Trabajo, Migraciones y Seguridad Social)	23 June 2018 – 29 January 2020: (■) State Secretariat for Migration; (■) General Secretariat for Immigration and Emigration; (■) Directorate-General for Migration; (■) Directorate-General for Integration and Humanitarian Attention; (■) State Secretariat for Social Security; (■) Directorate-General for Social Security Management; (■) Office of the Comptroller General of the Social Security; (■) State Secretariat for Employment; (■) Directorate-General for Labour; (■) Directorate-General for Self-Employment, the Social Economy and Corporate Social Responsibility; (■) Undersecretariat of Labour, Migration and Social Security; (■) Technical General Secretariat					
=== Ministry of Industry, Trade and Tourism ===
Ministry of Industry, Trade and Tourism (Ministerio de Industria, Comercio y Turismo)		Reyes Maroto	7 June 2018	13 January 2020	PSOE	
Ministry of Industry, Trade and Tourism (Ministerio de Industria, Comercio y Turismo)	23 June 2018 – 29 January 2020: (■) State Secretariat for Trade; (■) Directorate-General for International Trade and Investments; (■) Directorate-General for Trade Policy and Competitiveness; (■) State Secretariat for Tourism; (■) General Secretariat for Industry and Small and Medium-sized Enterprises; (■) Directorate-General for Industry and Small and Medium-sized Enterprises; (■) Undersecretariat of Industry, Trade and Tourism; (■) Technical General Secretariat					
=== Ministry of Agriculture, Fisheries and Food ===
Ministry of Agriculture, Fisheries and Food (Ministerio de Agricultura, Pesca y Alimentación)		Luis Planas	7 June 2018	13 January 2020	PSOE	
Ministry of Agriculture, Fisheries and Food (Ministerio de Agricultura, Pesca y Alimentación)	23 June 2018 – 29 January 2020: (■) General Secretariat for Agriculture and Food; (■) Directorate-General for Agricultural Production and Markets; (■) Directorate-General for Health of Agricultural Production; (■) Directorate-General for Rural Development and Forest Policy (disest. 22 Jul 2018); (■) Directorate-General for Rural Development, Innovation and Forest Policy (est. 22 Jul 2018); (■) Directorate-General for the Food Industry; (■) General Secretariat for Fisheries; (■) Directorate-General for Fishery Resources; (■) Directorate-General for Fisheries Management and Aquaculture; (■) Undersecretariat of Agriculture, Fisheries and Food; (■) Technical General Secretariat; (■) Directorate-General for Services					
=== Ministry of the Presidency, Relations with the Cortes and Equality ===
Ministry of the Presidency, Relations with the Cortes and Equality (Ministerio de la Presidencia, Relaciones con las Cortes e Igualdad)		Carmen Calvo	7 June 2018	13 January 2020	PSOE	
Ministry of the Presidency, Relations with the Cortes and Equality (Ministerio de la Presidencia, Relaciones con las Cortes e Igualdad)	23 June 2018 – 29 January 2020: (■) State Secretariat for Relations with the Cortes; (■) Directorate-General for Relations with the Cortes; (■) State Secretariat for Equality; (■) Government Delegation for Gender Violence; (■) Directorate-General for Equality of Treatment and No Discrimination (disest. 30 Jun 2018); (■) Directorate-General for Equality of Treatment and Diversity (est. 30 Jun 2018); (■) Undersecretariat of the Presidency, Relations with the Cortes and Equality; (■) Technical General Secretariat–Government Secretariat					
=== Ministry of Territorial Policy and Civil Service ===
Ministry of Territorial Policy and Civil Service (Ministerio de Política Territorial y Función Pública)		Meritxell Batet	7 June 2018	20 May 2019 (renounced)	PSOE (PSC–PSOE)	
Ministry of Territorial Policy and Civil Service (Ministerio de Política Territorial y Función Pública)		Luis Planas (ordinary discharge of duties)	20 May 2019	13 January 2020	PSOE	
Ministry of Territorial Policy and Civil Service (Ministerio de Política Territorial y Función Pública)	23 June 2018 – 29 January 2020: (■) State Secretariat for Territorial Policy; (■) General Secretariat for Territorial Coordination; (■) Directorate-General for Regional and Local Cooperation; (■) Directorate-General for Regional and Local Legal Regime; (■) State Secretariat for the Civil Service; (■) General Secretariat for Digital Administration; (■) Directorate-General for the Civil Service; (■) Directorate-General for Public Governance; (■) Office for Conflicts of Interest; (■) Undersecretariat of Territorial Policy and Civil Service; (■) Technical General Secretariat; (■) Government Commissioner for the Demographic Challenge					
=== Ministry for the Ecological Transition ===
Ministry for the Ecological; Transition (Ministerio para la Transición; Ecológica)		Teresa Ribera	7 June 2018	13 January 2020	PSOE	
Ministry for the Ecological; Transition (Ministerio para la Transición; Ecológica)	23 June 2018 – 29 January 2020: (■) State Secretariat for Energy; (■) Directorate-General for Energy Policy and Mines; (■) State Secretariat for Environment; (■) Directorate-General for Water; (■) Spanish Office for Climate Change; (■) Directorate-General for Biodiversity and Environmental Quality; (■) Directorate-General for Sustainability of the Coast and the Sea; (■) Undersecretariat for the Ecological Transition; (■) Technical General Secretariat					
=== Ministry of Culture and Sports ===
Ministry of Culture and Sports (Ministerio de Cultura y Deporte)		Màxim Huerta	7 June 2018	13 June 2018 (resigned)	PSOE (Independent)	
Ministry of Culture and Sports (Ministerio de Cultura y Deporte)		José Guirao	14 June 2018	13 January 2020	PSOE (Independent)	
Ministry of Culture and Sports (Ministerio de Cultura y Deporte)	23 June 2018 – 29 January 2020: (■) Undersecretariat of Culture and Sports; (■) Technical General Secretariat; (■) Directorate-General for Books and Promotion of Reading; (■) Directorate-General for Cultural Industries and Cooperation; (■) Directorate-General for Fine Arts; (●) High Council for Sports; (■) President's Office of the High Council for Sports; (■) Directorate-General for Sports					
=== Ministry of Economy and Enterprise ===
Ministry of Economy and Enterprise (Ministerio de Economía y Empresa)		Nadia Calviño	7 June 2018	13 January 2020	PSOE (Independent)	
Ministry of Economy and Enterprise (Ministerio de Economía y Empresa)	23 June 2018 – 29 January 2020: (■) State Secretariat for Economy and Enterprise Support; (■) General Secretariat for the Treasury and International Financing; (■) Directorate-General for the Treasury and Financial Policy; (■) Directorate-General for Economic Policy; (■) Directorate-General for Macroeconomic Analysis; (■) Directorate-General for Insurance and Pension Funds; (■) State Secretariat for the Information Society and the Digital Agenda (until 25 Aug 2018) / State Secretariat for Digital Progress (from 25 Aug 2018); (■) Directorate-General for Telecommunications and Information Technologies; (■) Undersecretariat of Economy and Enterprise; (■) Technical General Secretariat					
=== Ministry of Health, Consumer Affairs and Social Welfare ===
Ministry of Health, Consumer; Affairs and Social Welfare (Ministerio de Sanidad, Consumo y Bienestar Social)		Carmen Montón	7 June 2018	11 September 2018 (resigned)	PSOE	
Ministry of Health, Consumer; Affairs and Social Welfare (Ministerio de Sanidad, Consumo y Bienestar Social)		María Luisa Carcedo	12 September 2018	13 January 2020	PSOE	
Ministry of Health, Consumer; Affairs and Social Welfare (Ministerio de Sanidad, Consumo y Bienestar Social)	23 June 2018 – 29 January 2020: (■) State Secretariat for Social Services; (■) Directorate-General of Services for Families and Children; (■) Directorate-General for Disability Support Policies (disest. 25 Aug 2018); (■) Directorate-General for Disability Policies (est. 25 Aug 2018); (■) Government Delegation for the National Plan on Drugs; (■) General Secretariat for Health and Consumer Affairs; (■) Directorate-General for Public Health, Quality and Innovation; (■) Directorate-General for the Basic Catalogue of Services of the National Health System and Pharmacy; (■) Directorate-General for Professional Management; (■) Directorate-General for Consumer Affairs (est. 25 Aug 2018); (■) Undersecretariat of Health, Consumer Affairs and Social Welfare; (■) Technical General Secretariat					
=== Ministry of Science, Innovation and Universities ===
Ministry of Science, Innovation and Universities (Ministerio de Ciencia, Innovación y Universidades)		Pedro Duque	7 June 2018	13 January 2020	PSOE (Independent)	
Ministry of Science, Innovation and Universities (Ministerio de Ciencia, Innovación y Universidades)	23 June 2018 – 29 January 2020: (■) State Secretariat for Universities, Research, Development and Innovation; (■) General Secretariat for Universities; (■) Directorate-General for Research, Development and Innovation; (■) General Secretariat for Scientific Policy Coordination; (■) Undersecretariat of Science, Innovation and Universities; (■) Technical General Secretariat					
=== Spokesperson of the Government ===
Spokesperson of the Government (Portavoz del Gobierno)		Isabel Celaá	7 June 2018	13 January 2020	PSOE	

== Notes ==
Preceded by Rajoy II	Government of Spain; 2018–2020	Succeeded by Sánchez II
