= Màxim Huerta =

Spanish journalist and writer

The Most Excellent Máximo Huerta
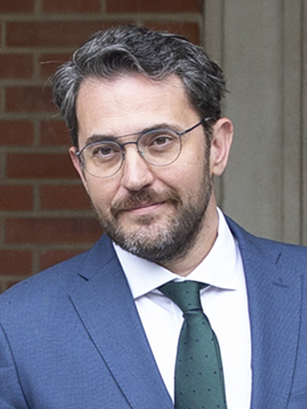

Minister of Culture and Sport
- In office 6 June 2018 – 13 June 2018
- Monarch: Felipe VI
- Prime Minister: Pedro Sánchez
- Preceded by: Íñigo Méndez de Vigo
- Succeeded by: José Guirao

Personal details
- Born: 26 January 1971 (age 55) Utiel, Spain
- Education: CEU San Pablo University

Máximo Huerta Hernández (born 26 January 1971), also known as Màxim Huerta, is a Spanish journalist, writer, television celebrity and former politician.

In June 2018 he was appointed by PM Pedro Sánchez to the post of the Minister of Culture and Sport of the first Sánchez government, and resigned one week later after it was revealed that he had committed tax fraud in 2006–2008.

== Biography ==
=== Early life and career ===
Huerta was born in Utiel, Valencia, as Máximo Huerta Hernández. He graduated in Information Sciences from the CEU San Pablo University and has a Master's Degree in Graphic Design and Editorial Illustration from the Istituto Europeo di Design. He started his career working in radio stations and newspapers in the Valencian Community: RNE's Radio 5 in Utiel and Radio Buñol, or Valencia 7 días and Las Provincias.

=== Career in television ===
Huerta first worked in television in 1997, when he joined the regional channel Canal Nou to present and edit the news programmes Informatiu Metropolità and the night edition of Informatiu. There, he was advised to change his name to Màxim to sound more Valencian. He began to work for Telecinco in 2000, presenting and editing the channel's regional programme for the Valencian Community. A year later, Huerta was promoted to the nationwide airtime and became one of the news anchors of Informativos Telecinco, where he remained for five years.

In 2005, Huerta became one of the co-hosts of the morning television show El programa de Ana Rosa hosted by Ana Rosa Quintana. He was part of the show for ten years, until September 2015.

In 2016, Huerta presented the travel documentary series Destinos de película, for Televisión Española (TVE).

In 2019, Huerta returned to TVE to host the daytime talk show A partir de hoy. In 2020, he participated in the music game show Mask Singer: Adivina quién canta as Gamba.

In 2021, Huerta joined the regional channel À Punt to host the magazine show Bona vesprada.

In 2022, Huerta, along with Alaska and Inés Hernand, hosted the first edition of Benidorm Fest, a song competition to determine Spain's entry for the Eurovision Song Contest.

=== Career as a writer ===
Huerta has authored nine novels —Que sea la última vez que me llamas Reina de la Tele (2009), El susurro de la caracola (2011), Una tienda en París (2012), La noche soñada (2014), No me dejes (Ne me quitte pas) (2015), La parte escondida del iceberg (2017), Firmamento (2018), Con el amor bastaba (2020), and Adiós, pequeño (2022) —, a travel book —Mi lugar en el mundo eres tú—, a children's book —Elsa y el mar—, and two illustrated books —El escritor and Partir de cero—. La noche soñada was awarded the 2014 Premio Primavera, and Adiós, pequeño was awarded the 2022 Premio de Novela Fernando Lara.

=== Minister of Culture and Sport ===
In 2018, the Prime Minister of Spain, Pedro Sánchez, elected Huerta as Minister of Culture and Sport. His appointment was criticized by some members of the public due to his previous tweets in which he had said, for example, that he hated sport. He resigned seven days after being appointed due to the revelation of a 2017 sentence that forced him to pay a €365,928 sanction for tax fraud committed in the years 2006–2008 with the use of shell companies.

Political offices
| Preceded by Íñigo Méndez de Vigo | Minister of Culture and Sport; 2018 | Succeeded by José Guirao |
