= María Jesús San Segundo =

Spanish economist, academic, diplomat and politician (1958-2010)

María Jesús San Segundo OAX
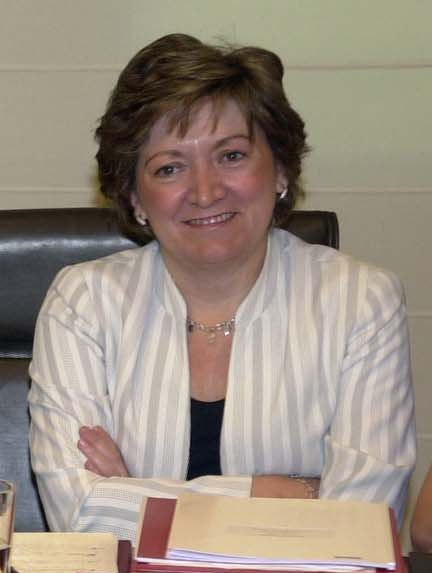

Minister of Education and Science
- In office 18 April 2004 – 11 April 2006
- Monarch: Juan Carlos I
- Prime Minister: José Luis Rodríguez Zapatero
- Preceded by: Pilar del Castillo (Education, Culture and Sports); Juan Costa (Science and Technology)
- Succeeded by: Mercedes Cabrera

Personal details
- Born: 25 March 1958 Medina del Campo, Castile and León, Spain
- Died: 17 December 2010 (age 52) Madrid, Spain
- Party: Spanish Socialist Workers' Party
- Education: University of the Basque Country; Princeton University

María Jesús San Segundo Gómez de Cadiñanos (25 March 1958 – 17 December 2010), was a Spanish economist, academic, diplomat and politician, minister of Education and Science of Spain between 2004 and 2006.

== Biography ==
María Jesús San Segundo studied in Burgos and in 1980 she graduated in economics from the University of the Basque Country, with a National Award for the Completion of Studies. In 1982 she completed her master's degree in economics at Princeton University in New Jersey, and there she obtained, in 1985, a Doctorate in Economics with the thesis entitled "Empirical Studies of Quality of Schooling".

She was a fellow of the Training Center of the Bank of Spain between 1982 and 1984 and a professor of economics at the Universities of the Basque Country and Carlos III of Madrid. Between 1994 and 1996, she served as advisor to the secretary of state for universities and research and between 2000 and January 2004 she was vice-rector of students at the Carlos III University of Madrid.

In 2002 she was appointed member of the University Coordination Council, by the Congress of Deputies at the proposal of the PSOE, and in January 2004 she was appointed member of the advisory committee to the candidate for the presidency of the government, José Luis Rodríguez Zapatero, with the task of collaborating in the design of the model of the future socialist government, in its ethical code and in its priorities.

After the general elections of 2004, San Segundo was named Minister of Education and Science. During this stage she focused his work on two major educational reforms, the Organic Law of Education (LOE), approved by the Congress of Deputies on April 6, 2006, and the partial modification of the Organic Law of Universities (LOU).

On 7 April 2006, her resignation was announced for Mercedes Cabrera due to the remodeling of the Government following the resignation of José Bono. Her relief became effective on 11 April 2006.

María Jesús San Segundo was also vice president of the Education Economics Association (AEDE), member of the Executive Committee of the European Access Network and member of the Advisory Committee for the Center for Research in Lifelong Learning (UK). He was a member of the Advisory Council of the Journal of Widening Participation and Spanish Public Finance.

She was the author of several publications and numerous articles on the economics of education, financing of education, evaluation of the educational system, academic performance, equal opportunities and access to education, etc.

After leaving the Government of Spain, María Jesús San Segundo was appointed Ambassador-Permanent Delegate of Spain to Unesco, a political position she held until 16 November 2010.

She died in Madrid on 17 December 2010 at the age of 52, victim of a cancer. Received the Civil Order of Alfonso X on 2011.
