= Carmen Montón =

Spanish politician (born 1976)

The Most Excellent Carmen Montón
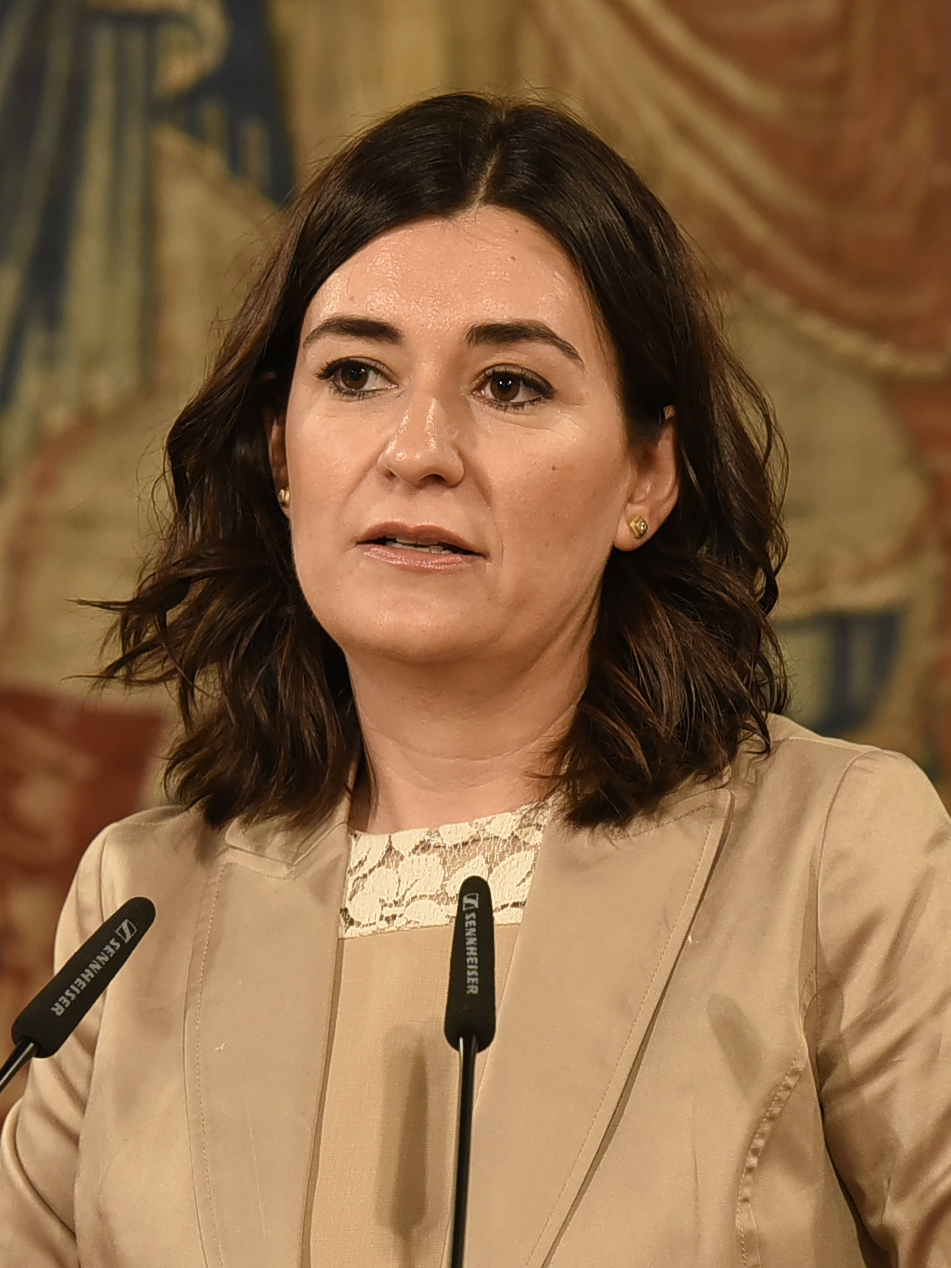

Ambassador Permanent Observer of Spain to the Organization of American States
- Incumbent
- Assumed office 11 March 2020
- Monarch: Felipe VI
- Prime Minister: Pedro Sánchez
- Preceded by: Cristóbal Ramón Valdés y Valentín-Gamazo

Minister of Health, Consumer Affairs and Social Welfare
- In office 7 June 2018 – 12 September 2018
- Monarch: Felipe VI
- Prime Minister: Pedro Sánchez
- Preceded by: Dolors Montserrat
- Succeeded by: María Luisa Carcedo

Regional Minister of Public Health of Valencia
- In office 30 June 2015 – 6 June 2018
- Preceded by: Manuel Llombart Fuentes
- Succeeded by: Ana Barceló Chico

Member of the Congress of Deputies
- In office 2 April 2004 – 30 June 2015
- Constituency: Valencia

Personal details
- Born: 9 March 1976 (age 50) Burjassot, Spain
- Party: Spanish Socialist Workers' Party
- Education: University of Valencia

Carmen Montón Giménez (born 9 March 1976) is a Spanish politician currently serving as ambassador permanent observer of Spain to the Organization of American States since 2020.

A member of the Spanish Socialist Workers' Party (PSOE), she served as Minister of Health, Consumer Affairs and Social Welfare under Pedro Sánchez and as Head of the Department of Universal Health and Public Health of the Valencian government under Ximo Puig.

== Biography and career ==
=== Politics in Valencia and Congress of Deputies ===
Born on 9 March 1976 in Burjassot, Montón is married with one child, and studied medicine and became involved in the youth wing of the PSOE. She entered active politics in 1999 when she was elected a councillor for her home town of Burjassot to the immediate north-west of Valencia city. She resigned from the council in 2004 when she was elected to the Congress of Deputies as a deputy for Valencia, being re-elected in 2008. She was regional counselor of Health of the Community of Valencia between 2015 and 2018.

Her activity in Congress in her first year was centred on legislative preparation for laws legalising marriage between two people of the same gender. She has also spoken in favour of efforts to reduce domestic violence, including the creation of a telephone line to help males of a violent disposition, and for new laws to allow pregnant deputies to cast votes from outside the Spanish Congress.

=== Minister of Health ===
She was chosen by Pedro Sánchez, new Spanish Prime Minister, following the motion of censure that the PSOE presented against the previous government of Mariano Rajoy (PP) and that was approved by the Congress of Deputies on 1 June 2018, appointed her as Minister in new Spanish government. Felipe VI sanctioned by royal decree of June her appointment as holder of the portfolio of Minister of Health, Consumer Affairs and Social Welfare. On 7 June she took office as Minister before the King at Palace of Zarzuela.

As Minister of Health, Consumer Affairs and Social Welfare in 2018, her policies were based in recovering health and social rights. Some of the main ones are the recovery of the access for every women to assisted reproduction techniques in the public health system and the creation of the Observatory of Women's Health. In addition, she worked on the defense of children's rights as well as starting projects for the prevention and management of suicidal behaviors.

As head of Department of Universal Health and Public Health of the Valencian government from 2015 to 2018), her policies focused on public health, recovery of rights and management efficiency. Under her management, Ms. Montón reversed a privatised hospital to the public system, recovered universal health access and eliminated pharmaceutical and orthoprothesic copayments. Furthermore, she guaranteed the treatment for all the patients of hepatitis C and implemented policies that helped the Valencian transplant system to become the most successful in Spain. She improved the kidney failure care system as well as developing the plan to treat diabetes in the Valencian Community. She is responsible for the creation of the Emergency and Urgent care plan in rural and isolated areas.

Moreover, she created the First Plan of Equality in the Valencian public health system and was also the first one to create a suicide prevention protocol. Other of the policies that she put in place were the Plans for Efficiency Improvement, Organization of Human Resources and the Dignification of Health Structures.

In her short term as Health Minister, she managed to restore the right to universal health care for all Spanish citizens and foreign residents in Spain (the previous government had excluded access to the Spanish National Health System for irregular migrants).

=== Ambassador Permanent Observer to the OAS (2020 – present) ===
Since 2020, Carmen Montón has served as the Ambassador Permanent Observer of Spain to the Organization of American States (OAS) and international organizations such as the Pan American Health Organization (PAHO), where she has contributed to promoting gender equality and public health policies in the region.

In 2023, she joined PAHO’s High-Level Commission on Mental Health and COVID-19 in the Americas. This commission produced the report A New Agenda for Mental Health in the Americas, which analyzes the impact of the pandemic on mental health in the region and proposes concrete recommendations for its improvement.

In 2024, she worked closely with the Inter-American Commission of Women (CIM), actively participating in several initiatives aimed at strengthening gender parity in public life. She was part of the drafting committee for the Inter-American Model Law on Parity in Public and Political Life, an initiative led by CIM. This law seeks to establish binding regional standards to ensure equitable representation of women at all levels of political decision-making, with particular emphasis on branches of government and judicial systems. As part of this project, she also took part in CIM’s initiative on women’s leadership, "Romper el Molde".

In addition, since 2022, Ambassador Montón has chaired the OAS Cultural Diplomacy Leadership Circle for the Art Museum of the Americas (AMA), a cultural diplomacy initiative that strengthens the museum’s role as a key space to promote the OAS's values through art.

Ambassador Montón has also promoted, from Spain’s Mission to the OAS, the creation of the Ñ Circle of Friendship for the Spanish Language at the OAS. Thanks to this initiative, on March 5, 2025, the OAS Permanent Council approved by acclamation the Declaration for the Inclusion of the Spanish Language as an Official Language of the International Court of Justice.

Political offices
| Preceded by Manuel Llombart Fuentes | Regional Minister of Public Health of Valencia; 2015–2018 | Succeeded by Ana Barceló Chico |
| Preceded by Dolors Montserrat as Minister of Health, Social Services and Equality | Minister of Health, Consumer Affairs and Social Welfare; 2018 | Succeeded by María Luisa Carcedo |
