= José Guirao =

Spanish cultural manager and art expert (1959–2022)

The Most Excellent José Guirao
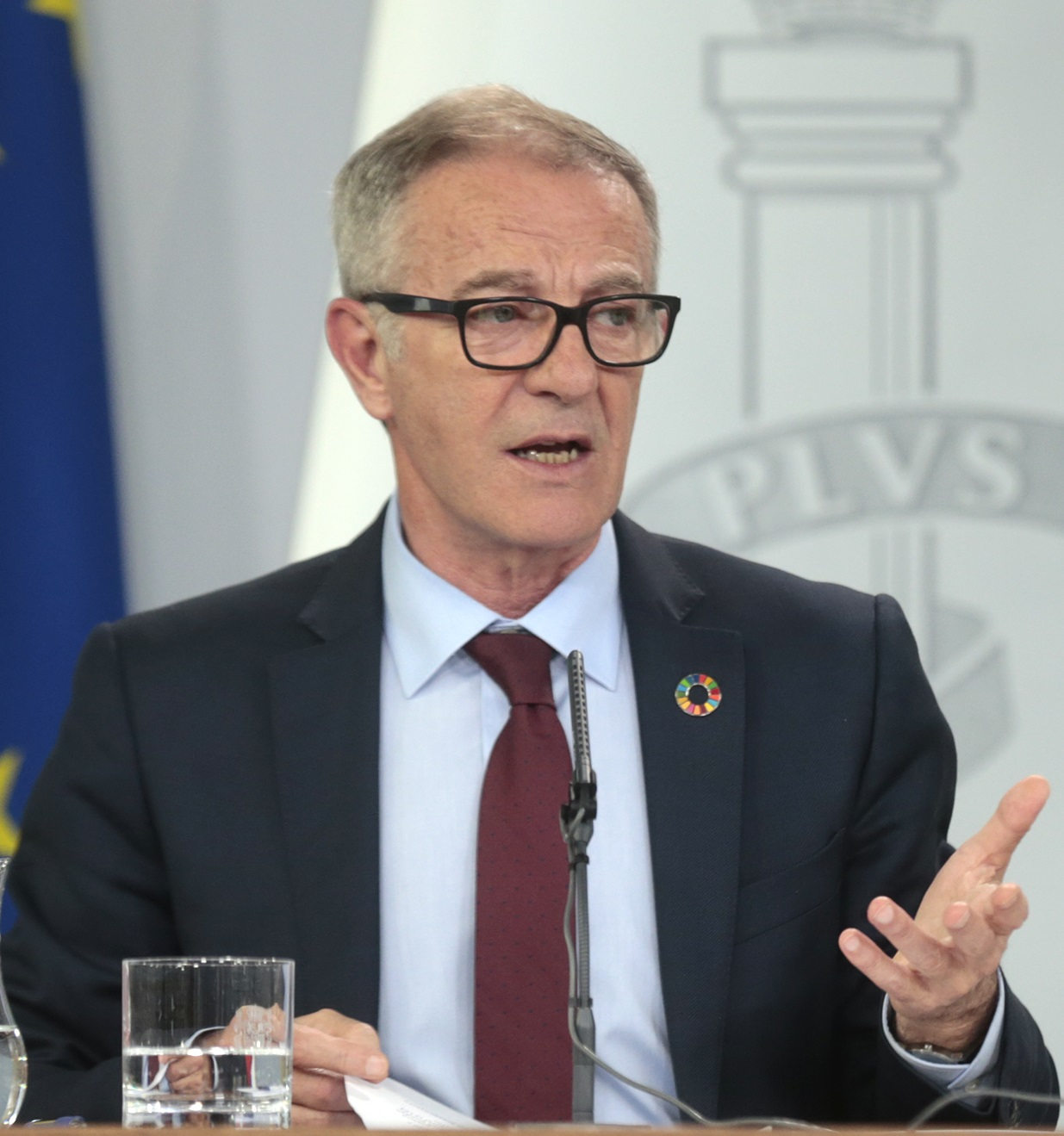
- Guirao in 2019

Minister of Culture and Sport
- In office 14 June 2018 – 13 January 2020
- Monarch: Felipe VI
- Prime Minister: Pedro Sánchez
- Preceded by: Màxim Huerta
- Succeeded by: José Manuel Rodríguez Uribes

Member of the Congress of Deputies
- In office 21 May 2019 – 29 January 2020
- Constituency: Almería

Personal details
- Born: 9 June 1959 Pulpí, Spanish State
- Died: 11 July 2022 (aged 63) Madrid, Spain
- Party: Independent
- Education: University of Murcia

José Guirao Cabrera (9 June 1959 – 11 July 2022) was a Spanish cultural manager and art expert who served as Minister of Culture and Sport in the government of Pedro Sánchez between 2018 and 2020. He was also Member of the Congress of Deputies.

Previously, he was director of the Reina Sofía Museum between 1994 and 2001 and director of the La Casa Encendida from 2002 and 2014. He was also Director-General of the Montemadrid Foundation until his appointment as minister, a private non-profit organization that works in favor of inclusion and equal opportunities, promotes a participatory citizenship with access to education, employment and culture and favors the conservation of the environment.

== Career ==
Guirao was born on 9 June 1959 in Pulpí, Province of Almería, in Andalusia and was the son of Lucas Guirao Valverde and Mercedes Cabrera Rodríguez. He was the youngest of four siblings; Bernardino, Beatriz and Ana Isabel. Guirao graduated in Spanish Philology from the University of Murcia, although he studied one of the grades in the University of Granada. His deskmate was Luis García Montero, poet and current Director of Instituto Cervantes. Guirao was the manager of the Cultural Department of the Provincial Council of Almería from 1983 to 1987.

From 1988 to 1993, Guirao occupied the position of Chief Manager of Cultural Assets at the Regional Government of Andalusia. He developed projects such as the General Plan of Cultural Heritage of Andalusia, the Law 1/91 of the Historical Heritage of Andalusia, the project of the Andalusian Center of Contemporary Art and the creation of the Andalusian Institute of Historical Heritage.

In 1993, Guirao was appointed to the position of Manager of Fine Arts and Archives at the Ministry of Culture. In 1994, he was appointed Director of the Museo Nacional Centro de Arte Reina Sofía. During his tenure, the project of the expansion of the museum was awarded to architect Jean Nouvel. He was also responsible for the reorganization of the collections and the commitment to emerging artists in the museum's programming. With the change of government led by Prime Minister José María Aznar in 1996, Guirao remained in office until 2000.

From 2001 to 2014, Guirao was the director of the cultural centre La Casa Encendida in Madrid. In 2013, the centre became part of the Fundación Montemadrid, and he was appointed Chief Manager of this foundation.

José Guirao was a member of the Federico García Lorca Foundation, of the Antonio Gala Foundation, of the Museo del Prado of the Museum of Contemporary Spanish Engraving Foundation. In addition, he was a guest professor of the master's degree in Cultural Management at the Carlos III University of Madrid.

=== Minister of Culture ===
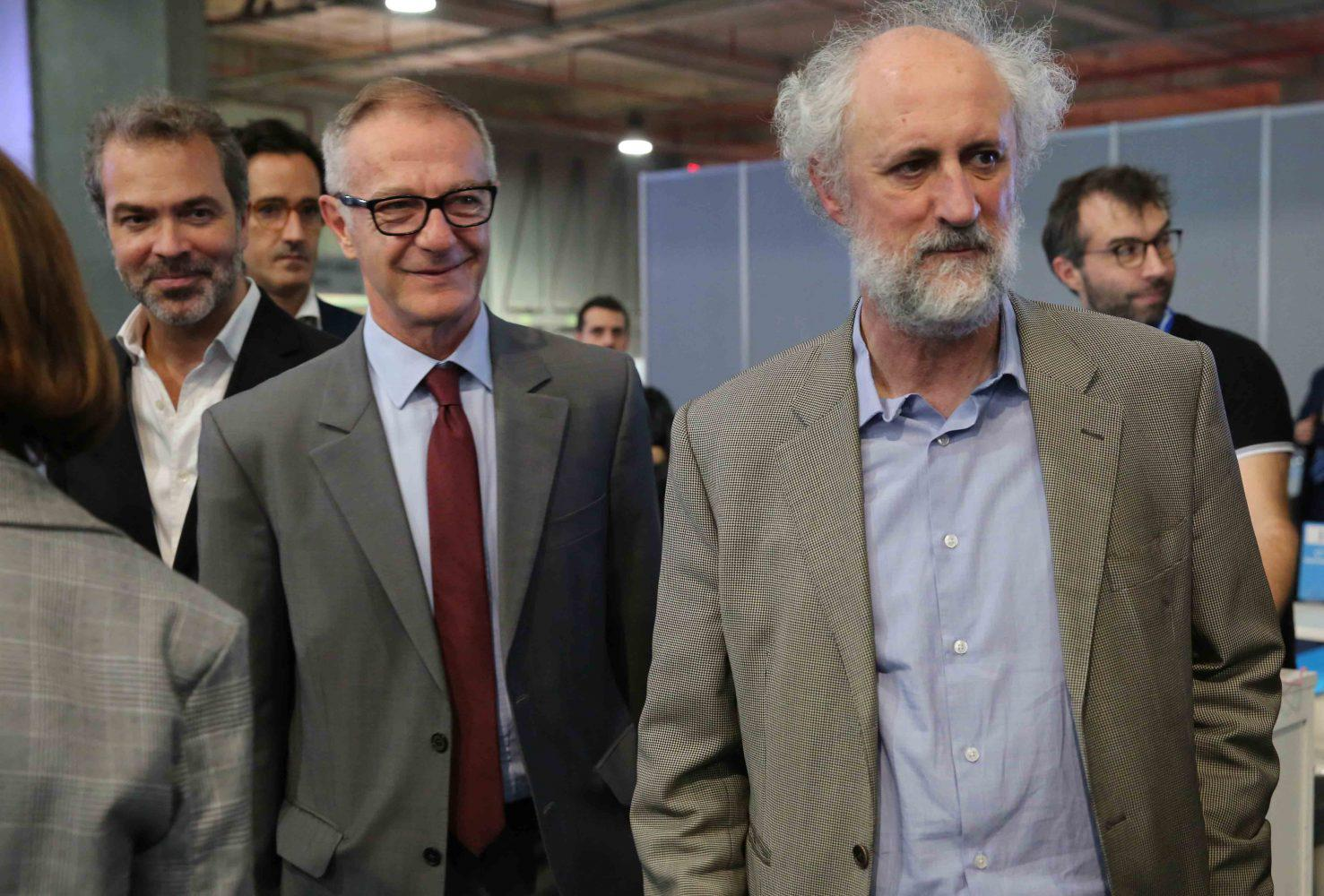
Guirao in October 2018

In June 2018, Guirao was chosen to succeed Màxim Huerta as Minister of Culture and Sport, after Huerta's resignation and took office on 14 June. His mandate had as main objectives the reform of the "Ley del Mecenazgo" and the "Ley del Deporte", to attend to the precarious situation of cinema and to mediate in the internal war of the Sociedad General de Autores y Editores. As a minister, he stated that, despite being against bullfighting, he should not impose anything and the changes should be in accordance with a balanced and settled social evolution and respecting what is a "Mediterranean tradition". One of the first measures he took was the cancellation of the merger between the Teatro Real and the Teatro de la Zarzuela and the approval of the first measures of the "Estatuto del Artista" in June 2018. He was also very much in favor of promoting the visibility of women's sports at the same level as men's sports. In August 2018, he was the first Spanish Minister of Culture to recognize video games as "culture".

On 21 August of that year, he threatened cinema managers to review the lowering of VAT on movie tickets if they did not comply with it, since at least 50% of movie theaters had not applied the reduction from 21% to 10% that the Spanish government had approved few weeks ago. Despite the controversy generated by these statements, in September Guirao stated that this "wake-up call" was useful.

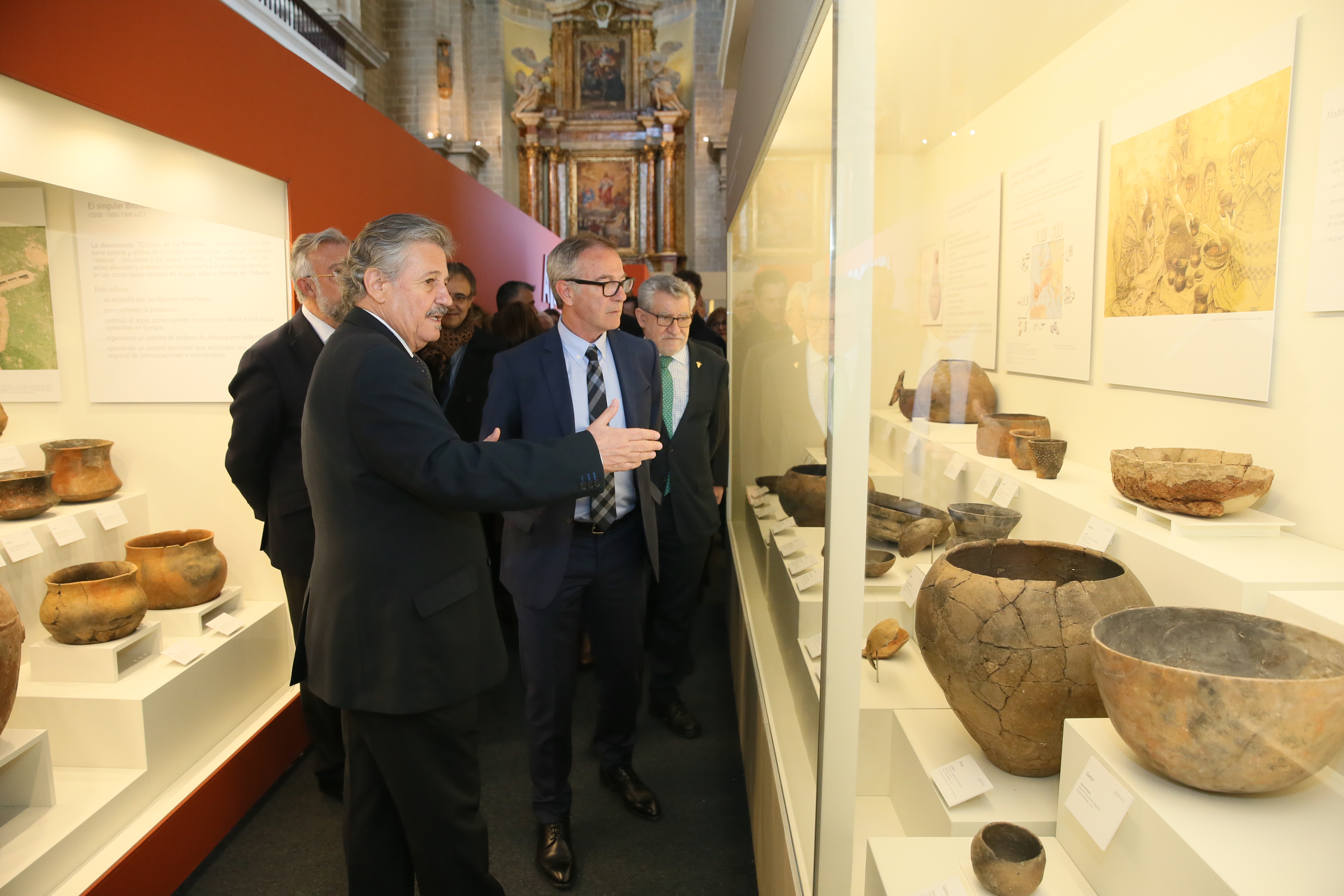
Guirao visiting the exhibition 'aTempora Talavera. Six thousand years of ceramics in Castilla-La Mancha" in Talavera de la Reina, 2019

On 11 December 2018, he announced that in the first quarter of 2019 the conflict generated by the Salamanca Papers would come to an end, so that it would no longer be returning to the Catalan government the documents that were confiscated from it after the Spanish Civil War. Guirao also rejected the return of a set of documents that the Catalan government requested because he alleged that they were not covered by the law.

In March 2019, the Provincial Committee of the PSOE chose him to be first in the electoral list to the Congress of Deputies for the constituency of Almería. He was elected MP in the general election of April. He was re-elected as deputy for Almeria in the November 2019 general election.

After the Notre-Dame fire in Paris on 15 April 2019, Guirao convened an interministerial meeting for 16 April to study measures for heritage protection in emergency situations and said that day in an interview that the government plans to review the security of all the country's monuments. On 26 April, after the extraordinary meeting of the "Historical Heritage Council", he announced that the government would approve the implementation of 3.5 million euros for plans to safeguard cultural property in the event of emergencies.

In June 2019 Guirao reached an agreement with the Duchess of the Infantado whereby the Ministry of Culture became able to use the entire Palacio del Infantado, ending a process that began in 1960.

On 9 January 2020 it was announced that Guirao was discontinued as Minister of Culture and Sport and was succeeded by José Manuel Rodríguez Uribes on 13 January. Shortly after, on 29 January, he resigned from his seat in the Congress. The unexpected dismissal of Guirao left unfinished the new "Patronage Law", whose draft was already finished; the reform of the "National Institute of Performing Arts and Music" and the approval of its regulatory law; the extension of the "historical heritage law" which had as a novelty the inclusion of the cultural landscape, industrial, photographic and audiovisual heritage as new assets to be protected; and the approval of tax benefits for international production, whose draft was ready to be submitted for approval.

=== Post-ministry ===
In May 2020 he was re-appointed Chief Manager of Fundación Montemadrid. In that position, Guirao had to deal with the effects of the COVID-19 pandemic on the foundation and worked on the renovation of the Palacio de la Música de Madrid. Guirao stepped down as director of the foundation at the end of 2021 and was succeeded by Amaya de Miguel in April 2022.

In August 2021 he published the book that he coordinated together with the academic Magdalena Cantero entitled Aún hay tiempo. Paisajes para después de la pandemia ("There is still time. Landscapes for after the pandemic"). On 17 September 2021 the minister of Culture Miquel Iceta appointed Guirao commissioner for the commemoration of the 50th anniversary of the death of Pablo Picasso, as president of the National Commission created to organize the events of that ephemeris. On 10 November, Guirao testified as a witness before the Provincial Court of Valencia in the trial for the alleged fraud in the purchase and donation of works by the painter Gerardo Rueda by the Institut Valencià d'Art Modern.

== Death ==
Guirao was diagnosed with cancer in March 2021. He died from the disease at his home in Madrid on 11 July 2022 at the age of 63. A private funeral was held the following morning, followed by cremation.

== Honors ==
- Grand Cross of the Order of the Sun of Peru (Peru, 2019)
- Grand Cross of the Order of Charles III (Spain, 2021)

== Selected works ==
- Guirao, C. J. (1994). Nicolás Muller: Fotógrafo. Barcelona: Lunwerg.
- Esteban, L. P., Guirao, C. J., & Sedano, E. P. (1998). Estudio sobre el estado de conservación del Guernica de Picasso. Madrid: Museo Nacional Reina Sofía.
- Aguirre, E., Guirao, C. J., Capa, C., Capa, R., Fusi, J. P., Whelan, R., Coleman, C., Centro de arte Reina Sofía (Madrid, Espagne). (1999). Capa, cara a cara: Fotografías de Robert Capa sobre la Guerra Civil española : de la colección del Museo Nacional de Arte Reina Sofía. Madrid: Museo nacional centro de arte reina Sofía.
- Museo Juan Barjola (Gijón, Spain), Guirao, C. J., & Museo Juan Barjola. (2003). Isidro Tascón. Oviedo: Servicio de Publicaciones del Principado de Asturias.
- Guirao, C. J. (2006). Balthus. Madrid: Unidad Editorial.
- Guirao, C. J., & Domínguez, C. (2013). Moderne Farbkonzepte: Albert Oehlen. Madrid: La Casa Encendida.
- Goytisolo, J., Gallego, R. M., Aranda, V., Doctor, R. R., Guirao, J., Ridao, J. M., Rizzante, M., Kundera, M. (2018). Campos de Níjar.
- Bergel, S. B. Y., Padros, C., Malvarez, P. L. A., Guirao, C. J., & In Fundacion Profesor Uria,. (2020). Derecho del arte: Anuario Iberoamericano 2019.
- Aún hay tiempo. Paisajes para después de la pandemia (2021)

Political offices
| Preceded by Màxim Huerta | Minister of Culture and Sport; 2018–2020 | Succeeded by José Manuel Rodríguez Uribes |
