= Ernest Urtasun =

Spanish politician

The Most Excellent Ernest Urtasun
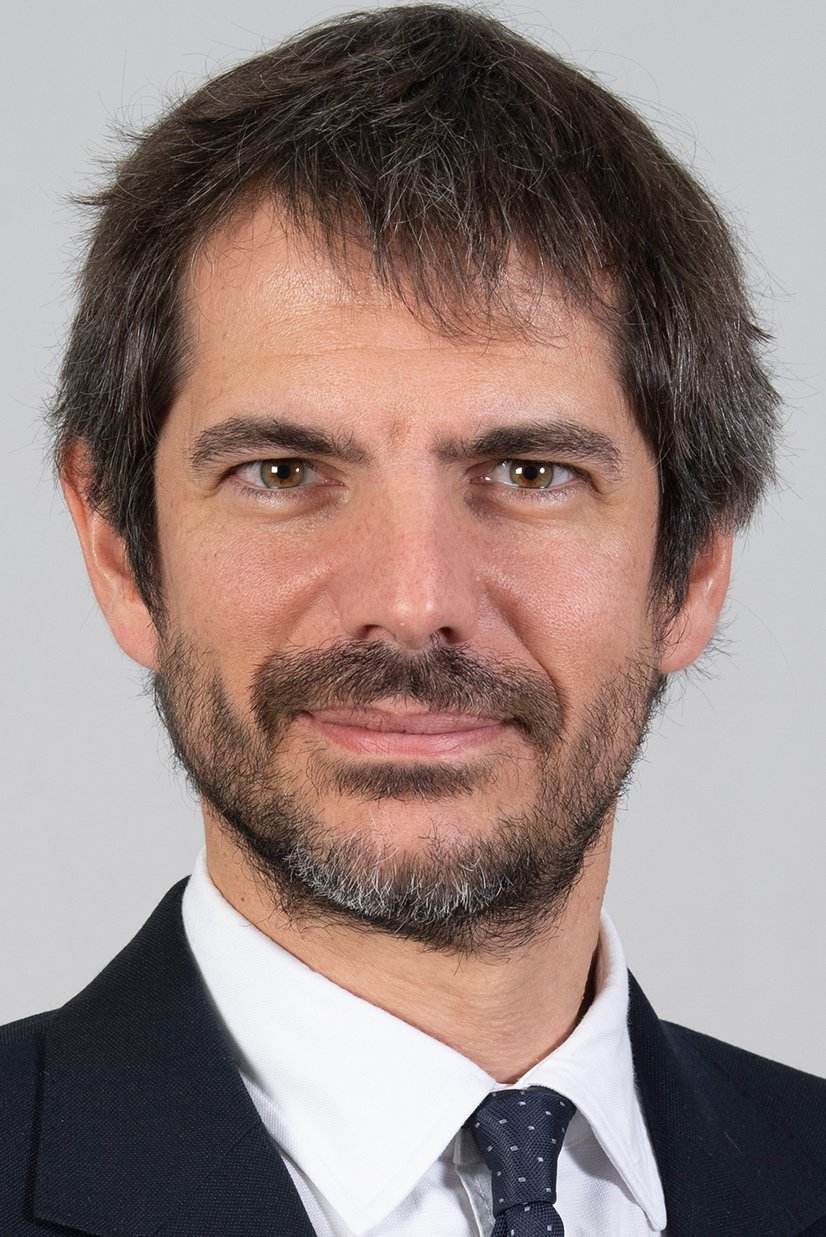
- Official portrait, 2023

Minister of Culture
- Incumbent
- Assumed office 21 November 2023
- Prime Minister: Pedro Sánchez
- Preceded by: Miquel Iceta

Member of the European Parliament
- In office 1 July 2014 – 20 November 2023
- Constituency: Spain
- Succeeded by: Esther Sanz Selva

Personal details
- Born: 27 January 1982 (age 44) Barcelona, Spain
- Party: Catalunya en Comú (since 2017); Green Left (since 2021)
- Other political affiliations: Initiative for Catalonia Greens (1997–2019); Workers' Commissions (since 2012)
- Education: Autonomous University of Barcelona; University of Barcelona
- Occupation: Politician, diplomat.

Ernest Urtasun i Domènech (Catalan pronunciation: [əɾˈnest uɾˈtazun]; born 27 January 1982) is a Spanish politician and economist, serving as Minister of Culture of Spain since 2023. He served as Member of the European Parliament between 2014 and 2023, integrated within the Greens–European Free Alliance (Greens/EFA) political group.

== Early life and career ==
Born on 27 January 1982 in Barcelona, Urtasun joined Joves d'Esquerra Verda, the youth wing of Initiative for Catalonia Greens (ICV), when he was 15 years old. He earned a licentiate degree in Economics from the Autonomous University of Barcelona (UAB), followed by a postgraduate degree in international relations from the University of Barcelona (UB).

== Career ==
He ran 6th in the Initiative for Catalonia Greens–United and Alternative Left–Entesa pel Progrés Municipal (ICV–EUiA–EPM) list for the 2003 Barcelona municipal election and the 2007 municipal election. He also ran as candidate to the European Parliament (EP) for the 2004 European Parliament election in Spain, 28th in the United Left–Initiative for Catalonia Greens–United and Alternative Left (IU–ICV–EUiA) list.

Between 2004 and 2008 Urtasun worked as adviser for MEP Raül Romeva. Later, he began working as a diplomat at the Ministry of Foreign Affairs and Cooperation and in 2011 became director of the general secretariat of the international organization Union for the Mediterranean. Since 2012, he has been member of the trade union Comisiones Obreras.

In 2009, Urtasun ran as candidate to the European Parliament (EP), 33rd in the list of The Left for the May 2009 european election in Spain.

For the European elections in 2014, Urtasun was elected as his party lead candidate in a primary election in which he defeated Salvador Milà. He was ultimately included in the third place of the Plural Left coalition list. After his election to the European Parliament, he became a member of the Greens/EFA political group. He served in the Committee on Economic and Monetary Affairs (ECON) and the Committee on Women's Rights and Gender Equality (FEMM), also joining the Delegation to the Euro-Latin American Parliamentary Assembly (DLAT) and the Delegation for relations with the countries of Central America (DCAM).

After the 2019 european elections, in which he ran under the Unidas Podemos Cambiar Europa banner, he was appointed as Greens/EFA deputy chairman, under the leadership of co-chairs Ska Keller and Philippe Lamberts. He repeated as member of the ECON and the FEMM committees and he also joined the Delegation for relations with Iran (D–IR).

In December 2020, Urtasun received the Economics & Monetary Affairs, Taxation & Budgets award at The Parliament Magazine's annual MEP Awards.

He was appointed Minister of Culture on 21 November 2023.

As Minister of Culture, he has taken an Anti-Bullfighting stance on the increasingly controversial practice. Urtasun halted the handing out of the National Bullfighting Award, while it was noted to be "Fragrantly Illegal" no bullfighting organizations in Spain appealed the decision. Following King Felipe VI's decline to attend the Reopening of Notre-Dame de Paris the invitation was handed to Urtasun, who also declined it thus leaving Spain without official representation at the event.

Early in his role Urtasun directed for the decolonization of museums in the country and the repatriation of Human Remains. Right-Wing Spanish political parties accused Urtasun of propagating the Black Legend for comparing the Spanish Empire to Leopold II's Congo Freestate, and of censoring them.

In January of 2025 Urtasun faced controversy after he met with and praised Karla Sofía Gascón, who had received an Oscar nomination for her role in the film Emilia Pérez, as a representative for Spain after various Islamophobic tweets of her emerged. Urtasun said he was sorry for the meeting and that Gascón's views did not represent Spanish society.

In 2026 Urtasun sided with the Museu Nacional d'Art de Catalunya and the Generalitat de Catalunya in a long running issue of repatriation of Romanesque murals taken from the Royal Monastery of Santa María de Sigena in Aragon during the Spanish Civil War, despite a supreme court order mandating their return. Aragonese political leader Mar Vaquero accused Urtasun of being racist against Aragonese people for this action.
