= Ministry of Culture (Spain) =

Government ministry of Spain

- Ministerio de Cultura

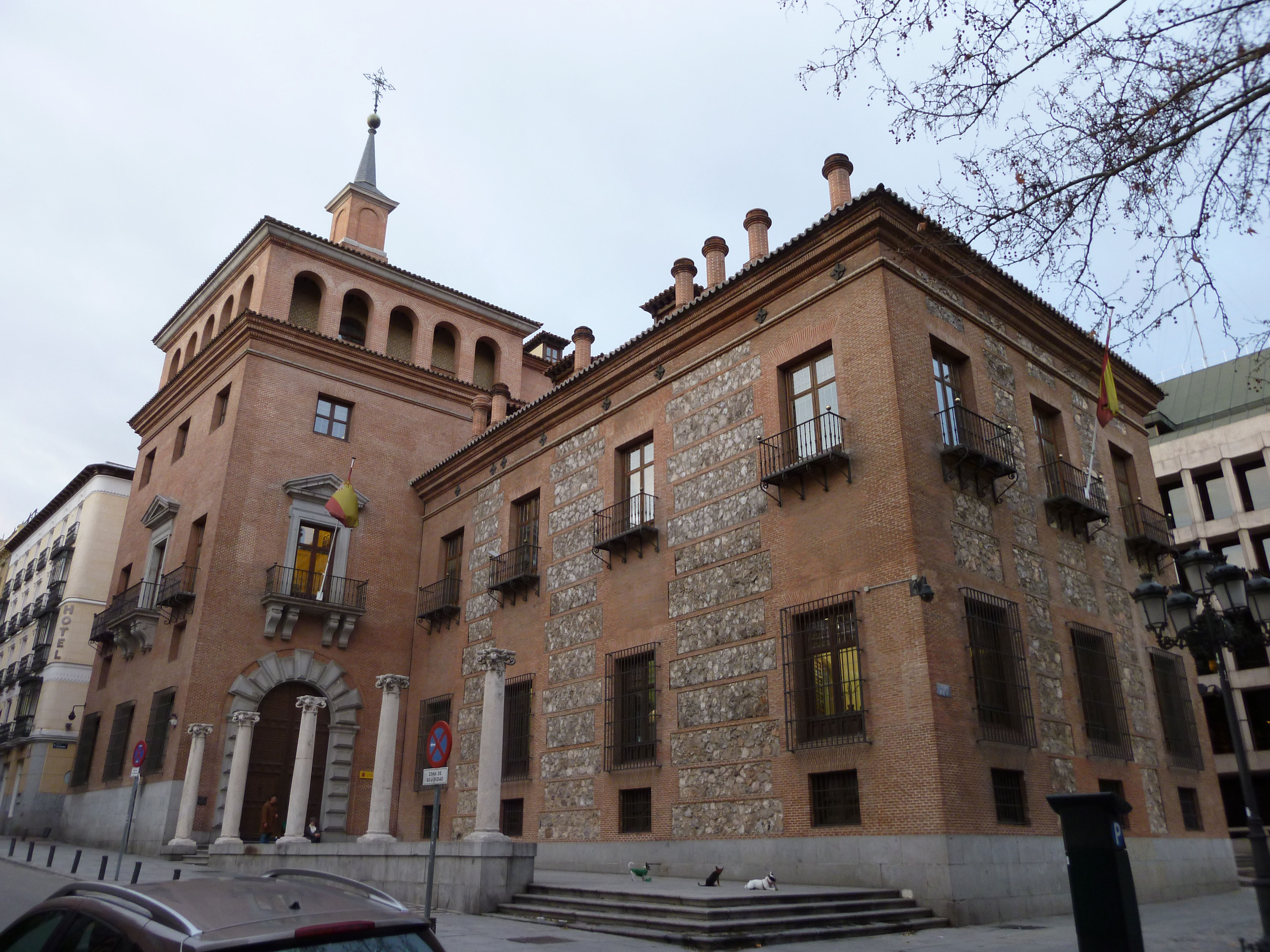
- The headquarters of the Ministry

Agency overview
- Formed: July 5, 1977; 49 years ago (as Ministry of Culture and Welfare)
- Preceding agencies: Ministry of Education and Science; Ministry of Information and Tourism
- Type: Ministry
- Jurisdiction: Government of Spain
- Headquarters: Casa de las Siete Chimeneas, 1 Plaza del Rey, Madrid
- Annual budget: € 1.15 billion, 2026
- Minister responsible: Ernest Urtasun, Minister
- Agency executive: Jordi Martí Grau, Secretary of State for Culture; María del Carmen Paez Soria, Under-Secretary
- Child agencies: National Library of Spain; Institute of Cinematography and Audiovisual Arts; National Institute of Performing Arts and Music; Prado Museum; Reina Sofía Museum
- Website: Ministry of Culture and Sport

The Ministry of Culture (MC) is the department of the Government of Spain responsible for the promotion, protection and dissemination of the Spanish historical heritage, national museums, art, books, reading and literary creation, of cinematographic and audiovisual activities and of national archives and libraries.

It is also responsible for the promotion and dissemination of culture in Spanish, as well as the promotion of cultural cooperation and, in coordination with the Ministry of Foreign Affairs, European Union and Cooperation, of international relations in the field of culture.

The MCD is headed by the Culture Minister, a Cabinet member who is appointed by the Monarch on advice of the Prime Minister. The minister is assisted by a Secretary of State and an Under-Secretary. The current minister of Culture is, since 21 November 2023, Ernest Urtasun.

== History ==
=== Early period ===
The Ministry of Culture was created during the Spanish transition to democracy. However, the government action on culture dates back to the 18th century. From the beginning of the century and promoted by the Crown, it appeared the first Royal Academies such as the Language (1713), History (1738) or Fine Arts (1752), all of them dependent from the Secretariat of State.

With the development and specialization of the Administration, the promotion and protection of culture was assumed by the Ministry of Development between 1834 and 1837 when it assumed powers over theaters, and all kinds of public amusements and recreation, as well as the Conservatories of Arts and Music, by the Ministry of the Interior between 1837 and 1847 and Development again between 1847 and 1851, by the Ministry of Grace and Justice between 1851 and 1855 and again by the Ministry of Development until 1900.

The Budget Act of 1900 created the Ministry of Public Instruction and Fine Arts which assumed the responsibilities on culture until 1977. During this period, the Directorate-General for Fine Arts was created in 1915 which had competences on civil constructions related to National Monuments, Museums, Artistic Schools, Painting, Music Schools and other entities of an artistic nature and in 1939 it was created the Directorate-General for Archives and Libraries. Both merged in 1974 in a new Directorate-General for Artistic and Cultural Heritage.

In 1946 it was created the Directorate-General for Cinematography and Theater which main task was to censor this cultural sectors. It was suppressed in 1967.

=== Democracy ===
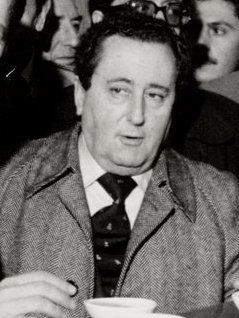
Pío Cabanillas Gallas, first Minister of Culture.

Finally, in 1977 it was created an independent Culture Ministry which assumed the Directorate-General for Artistic and Cultural Heritage from the Ministry of Education, the responsibilities of the Under Secretary for Family, Youth and Sport from the Ministry of the Presidency and the cultural functions of the Ministry of Information and Tourism (cinema, theaters, music). Likewise, the Secretariat of State for Culture was created and it also assumed RTVE.

The final structure established nine general directions: Artistic Heritage, Archives and Museums; Cultural Diffusion; Books and Libraries; Music Theater and Shows; Cinematography; Community Development; Youth; and Broadcasting and Television. It also assumed organically the Superior Council of Sports.

In 1981 the Ministry ceded to the City of Madrid the management of the Teatro Español. In 1985 the Ministry suffered a big reshuffle because of the devolution of cultural powers to the recently created Regions. At the same time it was created the National Institute of Performing Arts and Music (INAEM) and the Institute of Cinematography and Audiovisual Arts (ICAA).

Between 1996 and 2004 the Ministry of Culture was merged with the Ministry of Education although the Secretariat of State for Culture was maintained. In 2004 it was created again and in 2011 the Ministry assumed the competencies on bullfighting. It was suppressed again in 2011 until 2018 when the new prime minister Pedro Sánchez recovered this Ministry.

== Organization ==
Ministry of Culture, March 2024

The minister of culture, a member of the Council of Ministers, is the most senior official of the department. The minister establishes the ministry's policy and organization and appoints the department's officials.

To exercise its responsibilities, the minister is assisted by a secretary of state for cultural affairs and the Ministry's under-secretary, a civil servant who helps the minister in the daily management of the department.

As of 2026, this is the organization of the Ministry:

Ministry Organization (2026)
Minister	Cabinet (Chief of Staff)
Minister	Deputy Directorate-General for International Relations and European Union
Minister	Prado Museum
Minister	Reina Sofía Museum
Minister	National Library of Spain
Secretary of State for Culture	Directorate-General for Books, Comics and Reading
Secretary of State for Culture	Deputy Directorate-General for the Promotion of Books, Reading and Spanish Literature
Secretary of State for Culture	Deputy Directorate-General for Library Coordination
Secretary of State for Culture	Directorate-General for Cultural Rights
Secretary of State for Culture	Deputy Directorate-General for Promotion and Access to Culture
Secretary of State for Culture	Deputy Directorate-General for Regional Cultural Cooperation
Secretary of State for Culture	Deputy Directorate-General for Intellectual Property
Secretary of State for Culture	Directorate-General for Cultural Heritage and Fine Arts
Secretary of State for Culture	Deputy Directorate-General for the Management and Coordination of Cultural Assets
Secretary of State for Culture	Deputy Directorate-General for Registers and Documentation of Historical Heritage
Secretary of State for Culture	Deputy Directorate-General for the Cultural Heritage Institute of Spain
Secretary of State for Culture	Deputy Directorate-General for State Museums
Secretary of State for Culture	Deputy Directorate-General for State Archives
Secretary of State for Culture	Deputy Directorate-General for Visual Arts and Contemporary Creation
Secretary of State for Culture	Directorate-General for Performing Arts and Music
Secretary of State for Culture	Deputy Directorate-General for Theatre and Circus
Secretary of State for Culture	Deputy Directorate-General for Music
Secretary of State for Culture	Deputy Directorate General for Dance and Interdisciplinary Creation
Secretary of State for Culture	National Institute of Performing Arts and Music
Secretary of State for Culture	Institute of Cinematography and Audiovisual Arts
Secretary of State for Culture	Cultural Infrastructure and Equipment Agency
Under-Secretary	Technical General Secretariat
Under-Secretary	Deputy Technical General Secretariat
Under-Secretary	Deputy Directorate-General for Citizen Services, Documentation and Publications
Under-Secretary	Deputy Directorate-General for the Foundations Supervisory Authority
Under-Secretary	Statistics and Studies Division
Under-Secretary	Budget Office
Under-Secretary	Deputy Directorate-General for Economic Management
Under-Secretary	Administrative Office
Under-Secretary	Deputy Directorate-General for Human Resources and Services Inspection
Under-Secretary	Cultural Industries Coordination Centre
Under-Secretary	IT Division

== Budget ==
In millions of euros (€)
1. Performing and audivisual arts 350 (30.3%)
2. Cultural institutions 346.4 (30.0%)
3. Cultural promotion 321.6 (27.9%)
4. Administration and general services 83.9 (7.27%)
5. Cultural & historic heritage protection 52.6 (4.56%)

For fiscal year 2026, the Ministry of Culture has a consolidated budget of €1.15 billion. Of this amount, €606 million are directly managed by the ministry's central services while €548.5 million are managed by its agencies.

The budget can be divided in five main areas:

1. Cultural institutions (Programs 332A, 332B & 333A), which funds the national museums, archives and libraries.
2. Cultural promotion (333B, 334A, 334B & 334C), aimed at promoting culture and its outreach.
3. Performing and audivisual arts (335A, 335B & 335C), which funds the government policies on music, dance, theatre and cinema.
4. Administration and general services (331M, 321M, 144A & 322L), covering the Ministry’s central services and administrative structure.
5. Cultural & historic heritage protection (337B & 337C), which covers the ministry's expenditure on protection of cultural heritage.

In addition, Programme 000X (“Internal Transfers and Disbursements”) is excluded from the analysis, as it consists of transfers between public sector entities and would otherwise lead to double counting and distort the overall budget.

=== Audit ===
The Ministry's accounts, as well as those of its agencies, are internally audited by the Office of the Comptroller General of the State (IGAE), through a Delegated Comptroller's Office within the Department itself. Externally, the Court of Auditors is responsible for auditing expenditures.

Likewise, the Congress of Deputies and the Senate Committees on Culture, exercise political control over the accounts.

== List of officeholders ==
Office name:

- Ministry of Culture and Welfare (1977)
- Ministry of Culture (1977–1996; 2004–2011, 2023–present)
- Ministry of Culture and Sports (2018–2023)

Portrait	Name (Birth–Death)	Term of office			Party	Government	Prime Minister (Tenure)	Ref.
Portrait	Name (Birth–Death)	Took office	Left office	Duration	Party	Government	Prime Minister (Tenure)	Ref.
	Pío Cabanillas Gallas (1923–1991)	5 July 1977	1 September 1977	1 year and 275 days	PP	Suárez II	Adolfo Suárez (1976–1981)	
	Pío Cabanillas Gallas (1923–1991)	1 September 1977	6 April 1979	1 year and 275 days	PP	Suárez II	Adolfo Suárez (1976–1981)	
	Pío Cabanillas Gallas (1923–1991)	1 September 1977	6 April 1979	1 year and 275 days	UCD	Suárez II	Adolfo Suárez (1976–1981)	
	Manuel Clavero (1926–2021)	6 April 1979	17 January 1980	286 days	UCD	Suárez III	Adolfo Suárez (1976–1981)	
	Ricardo de la Cierva (1926–2015)	18 January 1980	9 September 1980	235 days	UCD	Suárez III	Adolfo Suárez (1976–1981)	
	Íñigo Cavero (1929–2002)	9 September 1980	27 February 1981	1 year and 84 days	UCD	Suárez III	Adolfo Suárez (1976–1981)	
	Íñigo Cavero (1929–2002)	27 February 1981	2 December 1981	1 year and 84 days	UCD	Calvo-Sotelo	Leopoldo Calvo-Sotelo (1981–1982)	
	Soledad Becerril (born 1944)	2 December 1981	3 December 1982	1 year and 1 day	UCD	Calvo-Sotelo	Leopoldo Calvo-Sotelo (1981–1982)	
	Javier Solana (born 1942)	3 December 1982	26 July 1986	5 years and 222 days	PSOE	González I	Felipe González (1982–1996)	
	Javier Solana (born 1942)	26 July 1986	12 July 1988	5 years and 222 days	PSOE	González II	Felipe González (1982–1996)	
	Jorge Semprún (1923–2011)	12 July 1988	7 December 1989	2 years and 244 days	Independent	González II	Felipe González (1982–1996)	
	Jorge Semprún (1923–2011)	7 December 1989	13 March 1991	2 years and 244 days	Independent	González III	Felipe González (1982–1996)	
	Jordi Solé Tura (1930–2009)	13 March 1991	14 July 1993	2 years and 123 days	PSC–PSOE	González III	Felipe González (1982–1996)	
	Carmen Alborch (1947–2018)	14 July 1993	6 May 1996	2 years and 297 days	Independent	González IV	Felipe González (1982–1996)	
Office disestablished during this interval. (Note: The department's competences were transferred to the Ministry of Education and Culture between 1996 and 2000 and to the Ministry of Education, Culture and Sports between 2000 and 2004.)
	Carmen Calvo (born 1957)	18 April 2004	9 July 2007	3 years and 82 days	PSOE	Zapatero I	José Luis; Rodríguez Zapatero (2004–2011)	
	César Antonio Molina (born 1952)	9 July 2007	14 April 2008	1 year and 272 days	Independent	Zapatero I	José Luis; Rodríguez Zapatero (2004–2011)	
	César Antonio Molina (born 1952)	14 April 2008	7 April 2009	1 year and 272 days	Independent	Zapatero II	José Luis; Rodríguez Zapatero (2004–2011)	
	Ángeles González-Sinde (born 1965)	7 April 2009	22 December 2011	2 years and 259 days	Independent	Zapatero II	José Luis; Rodríguez Zapatero (2004–2011)	
Office disestablished during this interval. (Note: The department's competences were transferred to the Ministry of Education, Culture and Sports between 2011 and 2018.)
	Màxim Huerta (born 1971)	7 June 2018	13 June 2018	6 days	Independent	Sánchez I	Pedro Sánchez (2018–present)	
	José Guirao (1959–2022)	14 June 2018	13 January 2020	1 year and 213 days	Independent	Sánchez I	Pedro Sánchez (2018–present)	
	José Manuel Rodríguez Uribes (born 1968)	13 January 2020	12 July 2021	1 year and 180 days	PSOE	Sánchez II	Pedro Sánchez (2018–present)	
	Miquel Iceta (born 1960)	12 July 2021	21 November 2023	2 years and 132 days	PSC–PSOE	Sánchez II	Pedro Sánchez (2018–present)	
	Ernest Urtasun (born 1982)	21 November 2023	Incumbent	2 years and 260 days	CatComú	Sánchez III	Pedro Sánchez (2018–present)	

== Awards given out ==
Established in 1975 and first presented in 1976, the Ministry of Culture awards the Miguel de Cervantes Prize each year to honor the lifetime achievement of an outstanding writer in the Spanish language.

Ministry of Culture also awards various other National Prizes.

== See also ==
- Right to science and culture
- Right to education
- Welfare rights
- Economic, social and cultural rights
- Culture minister
- Gold Medal of Merit in the Fine Arts
