= Miquel Iceta =

Spanish politician (born 1960)

The Most Excellent Miquel Iceta
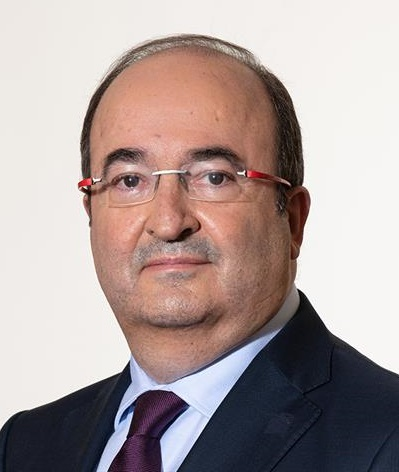

Permanent delegate of Spain to UNESCO
- Incumbent
- Assumed office 6 December 2023
- Preceded by: José Manuel Rodríguez Uribes

Minister of Culture and Sport of Spain
- In office 12 July 2021 – 21 November 2023
- Prime Minister: Pedro Sánchez
- Preceded by: José Manuel Rodríguez Uribes
- Succeeded by: Ernest Urtasun (Culture); Pilar Alegría (Sport)

Minister of Territorial Policy and Civil Service of Spain
- In office 27 January 2021 – 12 July 2021
- Prime Minister: Pedro Sánchez
- Preceded by: Carolina Darias
- Succeeded by: Isabel Rodríguez García (Territorial Policy); María Jesús Montero (Civil Service)

Member of the Congress of Deputies
- In office 17 August 2023 – 6 December 2023
- Succeeded by: Alba Soldevilla Novials
- Constituency: Barcelona
- In office 27 March 1996 – 2 November 1999
- Constituency: Barcelona

Member of the Parliament of Catalonia
- In office 5 November 1999 – 26 January 2021
- Constituency: Barcelona

President of the Socialists' Party of Catalonia
- Incumbent
- Assumed office 19 December 2021
- Vice President: Núria Marín
- First Secretary: Salvador Illa
- Preceded by: Núria Marín

First Secretary of the Socialists' Party of Catalonia
- In office 13 July 2014 – 19 December 2021
- Deputy: Eva Granados
- Preceded by: Pere Navarro
- Succeeded by: Salvador Illa

Personal details
- Born: Miquel Iceta Llorens; 17 August 1960 (age 66) Barcelona, Catalonia, Spain
- Party: Socialists' Party of Catalonia

Miquel Iceta Llorens (born 17 August 1960) is a Spanish politician who served as minister of Culture and Sport from July 2021 to November 2023 and as minister of Territorial Policy and Civil Service from January to July 2021, currently serving as permanent delegate of Spain to UNESCO since 6 December 2023.

He's one of the first openly gay politicians from Spain. A member of the Socialists' Party of Catalonia, he served as member of the Parliament of Catalonia from 1999 to 2021, and he also represented Barcelona at the Congress of Deputies twice, from 1996 to 1999 and from August to December 2023.

== Biography ==
Born on 17 August 1960 in Barcelona, he began studying chemistry but abandoned his studies after a year; he then enrolled as an Economics student in the Autonomous University of Barcelona (UAB), from whence he was expelled after sitting his first year five times, thus reaching the maximum amount of repeats allowed by university regulations. He then focused solely on politics. His earlier stint in the Partido Socialista Popular de Cataluña, which he had joined in September 1977, had been followed a year later by joining the Juventud Socialista de Cataluña and the Partido de los Socialistas de Cataluña (PSC).

Elected in the 1987 municipal elections, he served as a councillor in the Cornellá de Llobregat Town Hall from 1987 to 1991. A politician trusted by Narcís Serra, the latter, Deputy Prime Minister, appointed him Director of the Analysis Department of the Cabinet Office, a responsibility he held from 1991 to 1995, when he became Deputy Chieff of Staff.

Included as a candidate in number 7 of the list of the PSC to the Congress of Deputies for Barcelona in the general elections of 1996, he was elected deputy for the sixth legislature. Iceta publicly declared his homosexuality in October 1999, during the campaign for the elections to the Parliament of Catalonia in 1999; he was then considered the first Spanish politician to do so. Elected as a regional deputy in the October 1999 elections, his resignation from the Congress of Deputies became effective on November 2, 1999.

In July 2008, he became a member of the Federal Executive Committee of the PSOE. He was a member of the paper for the reform of the current Statute of Autonomy of Catalonia. In July 2014, he was elected, through primary elections and without rivals, as the new Secretary General of the PSC with 85% of the votes, replacing Pere Navarro.

On 30 June 2015 he was elected PSC candidate for the presidency of the Generalitat de Catalunya for the regional elections of 27-S, in which his party won 16 seats.

On 27 January 2021, Pedro Sánchez appointed him as minister of Territorial Policy and Civil Service of the Spanish government. Months later, he was appointed minister of Culture and Sport. He left the office on 21 November 2023.

In December 2023, he was appointed Ambassador Permanent Delegate of the Kingdom of Spain to the United Nations Education, Scientific and Cultural Organization (UNESCO).

== Bibliography ==
- Diari de Campanya: les eleccions del canvi, 2003, Editorial Mediterrània (2004). ISBN 978-84-8334-597-9
- Catalanisme federalista, Fundació Rafael Campalans (2007). ISBN 978-84-611-9895-5
- Icetadari, RBA (2015). ISBN 978-84-8261-791-6
- La tercera vía. Puentes para el acuerdo, Los libros de la Catarata (2017). ISBN 978-8490972823
- Trenta anys de militància socialista, Bubok (2008)
- Idees pel debat socialista, Bubok (2010)

Political offices
Preceded by Ignacio Varela	Deputy Moncloa Chief of Staff; 1995-1996	Succeeded by Gabriel Elorriaga
Preceded by Carolina Darias	Minister of Territorial Policy and Civil Service; 2021	Succeeded by Isabel Rodríguez García
Preceded by José Manuel Rodríguez Uribes	Minister of Culture and Sport; 2021–present	Incumbent
Party political offices
Preceded by Joaquim Nadal	Leader of the Socialist Group in the Parliament of Catalonia; 2003–2012	Succeeded by Jaume Collboni
Preceded by Office created	Deputy First Secretary of the Socialists' Party of Catalonia; 2004–2011	Succeeded by Núria Parlón
Preceded by Pere Navarro	First Secretary of the Socialists' Party of Catalonia; 2014–present	Incumbent
