= José Manuel Rodríguez Uribes =

Spanish philosopher of law and politician (born 1968)

The Most Excellent José Manuel Rodríguez Uribes
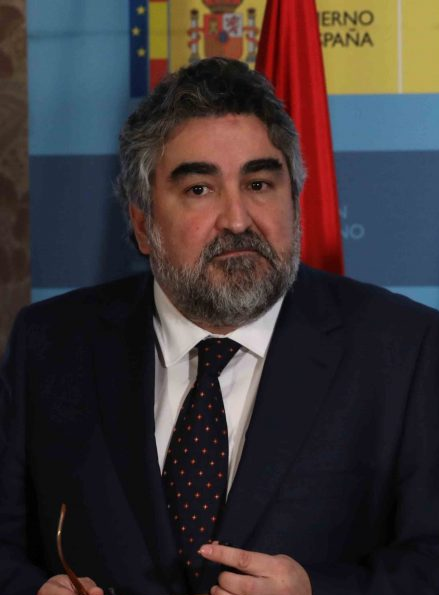

Minister of Culture and Sports
- In office 13 January 2020 – 11 July 2021
- Prime Minister: Pedro Sánchez
- Preceded by: José Guirao
- Succeeded by: Miquel Iceta

Government Delegate in the Community of Madrid
- In office 25 June 2018 – April 2019

Member of the Assembly of Madrid
- In office 11 June 2019 – 13 January 2020

Personal details
- Born: 9 October 1968 (age 57) Valencia, Spain
- Party: Spanish Socialist Workers' Party
- Education: University of Valencia; Charles III University of Madrid
- Occupation: Politician, university professor, philosopher of law

José Manuel Rodríguez Uribes (born 9 October 1968) is a Spanish philosopher of law and politician of the Spanish Socialist Workers' Party (PSOE) who has been serving as Minister of Culture and Sport in the government of Prime Minister Pedro Sánchez since 2020. He is also a member of the PSOE's federal executive board.

Rodríguez Uribes was a member of the Assembly of Madrid from 2019 to 2020. He served as Government Delegate in the Community of Madrid between 2018 and 2019.

== Early life and education ==
Born in Valencia on 9 October 1968, Rodríguez Uribes earned a licentiate degree in law at the University of Valencia (UV); he later obtained a PhD in the same field at the Charles III University of Madrid (UC3M), reading a dissertation in 1998 titled Los discursos democrático y liberal sobre la opinión pública (dos modelos, Rousseau y Constant) and supervised by Gregorio Peces Barba.

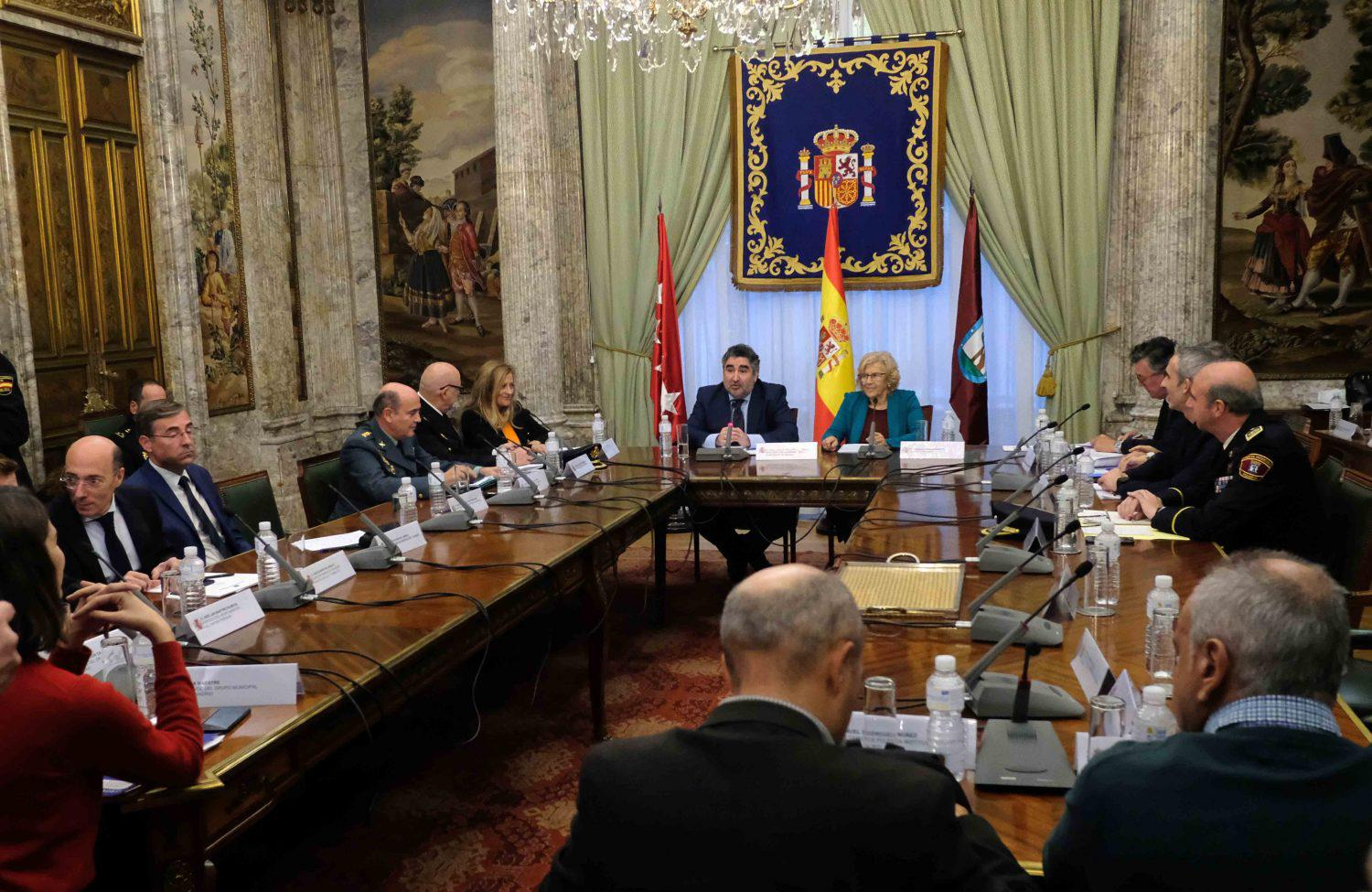
In November 2018, during a meeting in the Delegation of the Government with representative of the Madrid City Council, the National Police Corps and the Madrid Municipal Police Corps.

== Early career ==
Rodríguez Uribes was appointed Director General in Support of the Victims of Terrorism in September 2006. He held the post until December 2011, when Mariano Rajoy became prime minister.

Rodríguez Uribes has worked as tenured professor both at the University of Valencia and the Charles III University of Madrid.

== Political career ==
Rodríguez Uribes joined the Federal Executive Board of the Spanish Socialist Workers' Party (PSOE) led by Pedro Sánchez in June 2017, tasked in the area of Laicity.

Following the investiture of Sánchez as prime minister in June 2018, Rodríguez Uribes was chosen to replace Concepción Dancausa at the helm of the Government Delegation in the Community of Madrid. His appointment was sanctioned through an 18 June royal decree, swearing in the post on 25 June.

Rodríguez Uribes remained in office until April 2019 as he was included then in the 3rd place of the PSOE list for the 2019 Madrilenian regional election led by Ángel Gabilondo.

As an elected member of the 11th term of the regional legislature, Rodríguez Uribes became the attached spokesperson of the Socialist Parliamentary Group.

=== Minister of Culture and Sport, 2020–present ===
Appointed Minister of Culture and Sport of the Sánchez II Government, Rodríguez Uribes assumed office on 13 January 2020.

Amid the COVID-19 pandemic in Spain, Rodríguez Uribes led efforts to re-open the country's public life by announcing in May 2021 that a maximum of 5,000 spectators would be able to attend soccer games in regions with fewer than 50 COVID-19 cases per 100,000 inhabitants.

== Works ==
- — (1999). Opinión pública. Concepto y modelos históricos. Madrid.
- — (1999). Sobre la democracia de Jean-Jacques Rousseau. Madrid.
- — (2002). Formalismo ético y constitucionalismo. Valencia: Tirant lo Blanch.
- — (2013). Las víctimas del terrorismo en España. Madrid: Dykinson.
- — (2015). Gregorio Peces-Barba. Justicia y Derecho (La Utopía Posible). Madrid: Thomson Reuters.
- — (2017). Elogio de la laicidad. Hacia el Estado laico: la modernidad pendiente. Madrid: Dykinson.

Political offices
Preceded by Concepción Dancausa	Government Delegate in the Community of Madrid; 2018–2019	Succeeded by María Paz García Vera
