= Opinion polling for the 2015 Spanish local elections (Basque Country) =

In the run up to the 2015 Spanish local elections, various organisations carried out opinion polling to gauge voting intention in local entities in Spain. Results of such polls for municipalities and the three foral deputations (General Assemblies) in the Basque Country are displayed in this article. The date range for these opinion polls is from the previous local elections, held on 22 May 2011, to the day the next elections were held, on 24 May 2015.

Polls are listed in reverse chronological order, showing the most recent first and using the dates when the survey fieldwork was done, as opposed to the date of publication. Where the fieldwork dates are unknown, the date of publication is given instead. The highest percentage figure in each polling survey is displayed with its background shaded in the leading party's colour. If a tie ensues, this is applied to the figures with the highest percentages. The "Lead" columns on the right shows the percentage-point difference between the parties with the highest percentages in a given poll.

== Municipalities ==
=== Barakaldo ===
Polling firm/Commissioner	Fieldwork date	Sample size	Turnout	PSE–EE (PSOE)	PNV	PP	EH Bildu	EzAn–IU	UPyD	Podemos	C's	BD	Irabazi	Lead
2015 municipal election	24 May 2015	—N/a	58.7	26.8; 8	26.9; 8	9.2; 3	14.2; 4	(Note: Within Irabazi.)	1.5; 0	–	–	4.6; 0	12.0; 4	0.1
Ikerfel/El Correo	29 Apr–2 May 2015	?	?	26.9; 8	26.1; 8	8.5; 2	15.6; 5		2.4; 0	–	–	4.4; 0	13.3; 4	0.8
Barakaldo Digital	18–20 Apr 2015	543	?	21.1	24.0	3.8	14.5		–	24.6	3.8	–	8.2	0.6
2011 municipal election	22 May 2011	—N/a	56.5	29.1; 8	24.9; 7	17.5; 5	15.4; 4	6.1*; 1	–	–	–	–	–	4.2
(*) Results for United Left–Greens.

=== Bilbao ===
Polling firm/Commissioner	Fieldwork date	Sample size	Turnout	PNV	PP	EH Bildu	PSE–EE (PSOE)	EzAn–IU	UPyD	Equo	Podemos	C's	GB	UB	Lead
2015 municipal election	24 May 2015	—N/a	59.3	39.3; 13	11.9; 4	14.0; 4	12.0; 4	(Note: Within UdalBerri.)	0.8; 0			3.5; 0	6.5; 2	8.5; 2	25.3
Sigma Dos/El Mundo	13–14 May 2015	500	?	39.7; 13	13.4; 4	14.2; 4/5	9.7; 3		–			4.2; 0	–	14.0; 4/5	25.5
JM&A/Público	12 May 2015	?	?	? 13	? 4	? 5	? 3		–			–	–	? 4	?
JM&A/Público	3 May 2015	?	?	38.1; 13	10.4; 3	11.1; 4	10.6; 3	5.1; 0	0.8; 0			3.7; 0	–	14.3; 5	23.8
Ikerfel/El Correo	29 Apr–2 May 2015	?	?	41.2; 13/14	9.7; 3	15.5; 4/5	10.4; 3		1.4; 0			4.3; 0	–	14.7; 4/5	25.7
Ikertalde/GPS	22–29 Apr 2015	406	67.0	38.0; 13	14.5; 4	14.6; 4	12.0; 4		0.3; 0			3.5; 0	–	13.0; 4	23.4
Gizaker/Grupo Noticias	20–23 Apr 2015	475	66.2	41.1; 13/14	11.7; 4	17.3; 5	12.1; 3/4		0.8; 0			3.7; 0	–	9.2; 3	23.8
Sigma Dos/El Mundo	25–26 Mar 2015	500	?	39.4; 13/14	13.3; 4/5	10.6; 3/4	10.5; 3/4	–	–	–	11.8; 4	4.9; 0/1	3.5; 0	–	26.1
Ikertalde/GPS	9–14 Feb 2015	406	67.0	36.0; 12	13.5; 4	14.0; 4	11.5; 4	3.0; 0	1.0; 0	–	16.0; 5	–	–	–	20.0
Ikerfel/El Correo	7–13 Jan 2015	?	?	44.6; 15	9.4; 3	13.5; 4	12.9; 4	8.6; 2/3	4.8; 0/1	–	–	0.4; 0	–	–	31.1
Ikerfel/El Correo	7–13 Jan 2015	?	?	40.3; 13/14	9.4; 3	11.1; 3/4	10.1; 3	4.7; 0/1	4.1; 0	–	15.7; 5	0.3; 0	–	–	24.6
Torrene Consulting/Gara	13–31 Oct 2014	?	64.4	37.8; 12	13.1; 4	17.5; 5	15.4; 4	2.2; 0	–	–	12.5; 4	–	–	–	20.3
Ikertalde/GPS	6–13 Oct 2014	406	63.0	38.9; 13	14.2; 5	16.0; 5	12.5; 4	2.5; 0	1.0; 0	1.0; 0	8.5; 2	–	–	–	22.9
2011 municipal election	22 May 2011	—N/a	61.1	44.2; 15	17.2; 6	14.2; 4	13.4; 4	3.4*; 0	1.1; 0	–	–	–	–	–	27.0
(*) Results for United Left–Greens.

=== Donostia-San Sebastián ===
Polling firm/Commissioner	Fieldwork date	Sample size	Turnout	EH Bildu	PSE–EE (PSOE)	PP	PNV	EzAn–IU	UPyD	Equo	Podemos	C's	Irabazi	Lead
2015 municipal election	24 May 2015	—N/a	66.6	20.9; 6	24.5; 7	9.5; 3	29.7; 9		0.7; 0		–	3.7; 0	7.1; 2	5.1
Gizaker/Grupo Noticias	14 May 2015	400	66.6	27.1; 8/9	19.1; 6	12.0; 3/4	28.9; 9/10		–		–	2.5; 0	3.4; 0	1.8
Ikerfel/El Correo	29 Apr–2 May 2015	?	?	25.9; 7/8	19.5; 5/6	9.6; 2/3	29.8; 9		1.1; 0		–	5.2; 0/1	8.2; 2	3.9
Ikertalde/GPS	22–29 Apr 2015	406	63.0	25.8; 8	17.5; 5	15.5; 5	26.0; 8		0.2; 0		–	4.2; 0	6.0; 1	0.2
Gizaker/Grupo Noticias	14–18 Apr 2015	352	69.7	26.8; 8/9	17.3; 5	13.6; 4	27.2; 9		0.6; 0		5.2; 0/1	2.5; 0	3.1; 0	0.4
Ikertalde/GPS	9–14 Feb 2015	406	65.0	22.7; 7	17.0; 5	15.0; 4	24.8; 7	2.5; 0	1.0; 0	–	–	12.5; 4	–	2.1
Ikerfel/El Correo	7–13 Jan 2015	?	?	21.6; 6	21.1; 6	10.1; 3	32.8; 10	8.6; 2	1.0; 0	–	–	0.9; 0	–	11.2
Ikerfel/El Correo	7–13 Jan 2015	?	?	17.9; 5/6	18.2; 5/6	10.1; 3	29.4; 9	4.3; 0	1.0; 0	–	14.6; 4/5	0.9; 0	–	11.2
Torrene Consulting/Gara	13–31 Oct 2014	?	?	27.8; 9	16.7; 5	9.7; 3	20.8; 6	–	–	–	12.5; 4	–	–	7.0
Ikertalde/GPS	6–13 Oct 2014	406	62.0	25.0; 8	17.4; 5	14.5; 4	21.2; 7	3.0; 0	1.3; 0	1.0; 0	9.4; 3	–	–	3.8
2011 municipal election	22 May 2011	—N/a	66.6	24.3; 8	22.6; 7	19.0; 6	17.9; 6	2.6*; 0	1.5; 0	–	–	–	–	1.7
(*) Results for United Left–Greens.

=== Durango ===
Polling firm/Commissioner	Fieldwork date	Sample size	Turnout	PNV	EH Bildu	PSE–EE (PSOE)	PP	Aralar	EzAn–IU	SQ-2D	Lead
2015 municipal election	24 May 2015	—N/a	63.2	37.0; 8	31.3; 7	9.5; 2	7.0; 1	(Note: Within EH Bildu.)	(Note: Within Herriaren Eskubidea.)	13.4; 3	5.7
Gizaker/City Council of Durango	10 Mar 2015	557	?	36.0; 8/9	35.5; 8/9	9.5; 2	8.0; 1/2		2.2; 0	8.0; 1/2	0.5
2011 municipal election	22 May 2011	—N/a	64.1	33.9; 8	26.6; 6	13.1; 3	10.9; 2	10.0; 2	3.4*; 2	–	7.3
(*) Results for United Left–Greens.

=== Eibar ===
Polling firm/Commissioner	Fieldwork date	Sample size	Turnout	PSE–EE (PSOE)	EH Bildu	PNV	PP	Irabazi	Lead
2015 municipal election	24 May 2015	—N/a	62.3	41.9; 10	24.0; 5	21.2; 5	4.1; 0	6.8; 1	17.9
Ikerfel/El Correo	29 Apr–2 May 2015	?	?	36.2; 8	26.5; 6	24.3; 5	6.9; 1	6.1; 1	9.7
2011 municipal election	22 May 2011	—N/a	64.1	35.4; 9	25.9; 6	18.5; 4	7.8; 2	–	9.5

=== Getxo ===
Polling firm/Commissioner	Fieldwork date	Sample size	Turnout	PNV	PP	EH Bildu	PSE–EE (PSOE)	EzAn–IU	UPyD	GUK	Cs	Vox	Lead
2015 municipal election	24 May 2015	—N/a	63.5	34.1; 9	18.6; 5	14.4; 4	7.6; 2	(Note: Within GUK.)	0.8; 0	14.5; 4	5.9; 1	2.0; 0	15.5
Ikerfel/El Correo	29 Apr–2 May 2015	?	?	34.2; 9	18.3; 5	16.1; 4	9.2; 2		1.2; 0	14.2; 4	5.7; 1	1.1; 0	15.9
2011 municipal election	22 May 2011	—N/a	67.7	32.9; 10	30.1; 9	16.4; 4	9.7; 2	2.5*; 0	1.4; 0	–	–	–	2.8
(*) Results for United Left–Greens.

=== Irun ===
Polling firm/Commissioner	Fieldwork date	Sample size	Turnout	PSE–EE (PSOE)	PNV	EH Bildu	PP	EzAn–IU	UPyD	SPI	C's	Irabazi	Lead
2015 municipal election	24 May 2015	—N/a	60.5	33.4; 10	18.2; 5	12.4; 3	7.8; 2		0.8; 0	18.3; 5	3.7; 0	4.0; 0	15.1
Ikerfel/El Correo	29 Apr–2 May 2015	?	?	25.7; 7	20.6; 5/6	14.6; 4	9.0; 2		1.5; 0	15.5; 4	6.5; 1	6.9; 1/2	5.1
2011 municipal election	22 May 2011	—N/a	55.7	30.9; 9	17.9; 5	17.2; 5	17.1; 5	6.1*; 1	2.8; 0	–	–	–	13.0
(*) Results for United Left–Greens.

=== Vitoria-Gasteiz ===
Polling firm/Commissioner	Fieldwork date	Sample size	Turnout	PP	PNV	PSE–EE (PSOE)	EH Bildu	EBB	UPyD	EzAn–IU	Equo	S–HG	C's	Irabazi	Lead
2015 municipal election	24 May 2015	—N/a	64.8	29.8; 9	16.6; 5	11.9; 4	19.5; 6	–	0.8; 0			8.7; 2	3.2; 0	5.1; 1	10.3
Ikerfel/El Correo	29 Apr–2 May 2015	?	?	20.1; 6	18.9; 6	14.4; 4	19.7; 6	–	1.8; 0			10.9; 3	5.3; 1	5.2; 1	0.4
Ikertalde/GPS	22–29 Apr 2015	406	67.0	20.5; 6	20.0; 6	16.5; 5	19.5; 6	–	0.5; 0			9.0; 3	4.5; 0	5.0; 1	0.5
CIS	23 Mar–19 Apr 2015	499	?	25.9; 8	17.7; 5	12.8; 4	17.8; 5	–	0.5; 0			6.4; 2	3.3; 0	11.4; 3	8.1
Gizaker/Grupo Noticias	13–14 Apr 2015	400	65.8	22.3; 7	22.5; 7	14.2; 4	18.6; 6	–	1.4; 0			10.5; 3	3.5; 0	3.4; 0	0.2
Ikertalde/GPS	9–14 Feb 2015	406	67.0	20.5; 6	19.0; 6	16.5; 5	19.0; 6	–	2.5; 0	3.5; 0	–	14.5; 4	–	–	1.5
Ikerfel/El Correo	7–13 Jan 2015	?	?	18.5; 6	20.8; 6/7	16.3; 5	18.2; 5/6	–	5.5; 1	9.5; 3	–	–	3.7; 0	–	2.3
Ikerfel/El Correo	7–13 Jan 2015	?	?	18.5; 6	18.4; 6	13.3; 4	14.3; 4/5	–	5.3; 0/1	4.7; 0/1	–	16.3; 5	3.0; 0	–	0.1
Torrene Consulting/Gara	13–31 Oct 2014	?	62.8	22.7; 7	21.0; 6	15.1; 5	19.8; 6	–	3.5; 0	2.3; 0	–	10.5; 3	–	–	1.7
Ikertalde/GPS	6–13 Oct 2014	406	65.0	19.8; 6	20.0; 7	16.1; 5	19.7; 6	–	2.3; 0	3.0; 0	1.5; 0	11.4; 3	–	–	0.2
Gizaker/Grupo Noticias	12–16 Sep 2014	400	?	22.1; 7	22.3; 7	15.0; 4	19.4; 6	–	3.0; 0	3.7; 0	–	11.2; 3	–	–	0.2
Gizaker/Grupo Noticias	4–6 Jun 2013	600	?	22.8; 7	24.3; 7/8	17.8; 5/6	19.0; 6	2.7; 0	5.0; 1	3.8; 0	–	–	–	–	1.5
2011 municipal election	22 May 2011	—N/a	61.5	29.2; 9	19.1; 6	18.7; 6	17.8; 6	4.4; 0	2.3; 0	–	–	–	–	–	10.1

== General Assemblies ==
=== Álava ===
Polling firm/Commissioner	Fieldwork date	Sample size	Turnout	PP	PNV	EH Bildu	PSE–EE (PSOE)	EBB	Aralar	UPyD	IU–LV	Equo	Podemos	C's	Irabazi	Lead
2015 foral election	24 May 2015	—N/a	65.6	22.0; 12	21.6; 13	20.4; 11	11.2; 5	–		0.7; 0			14.6; 8	3.1; 1	3.7; 1	0.4
Ikerfel/El Correo	29 Apr–2 May 2015	778	?	14.2; 8	22.8; 13	21.3; 12	12.6; 6	–		1.8; 0			12.4; 7	6.3; 3	5.2; 2	1.5
Ikertalde/GPS	22–29 Apr 2015	518	68.0	19.7	20.7	20.4	15.0	–		0.7			12.2	3.7	3.0	0.3
Gizaker/Grupo Noticias	13–20 Apr 2015	1,150	72.0	16.4; 9	24.6; 16	22.3; 13	13.9; 8	–		–			10.0; 4	4.1; 1	–	2.3
Ikertalde/GPS	9–14 Feb 2015	518	68.0	20.5	21.0	19.5	14.5	–		3.0	1.5	–	15.0	–	–	0.5
Ikerfel/El Correo	7–13 Jan 2015	778	?	13.7; 7	19.9; 12	17.3; 11	12.5; 6	–		4.7; 2	4.2; 0	–	20.7; 12	2.2; 0	–	0.8
Torrene Consulting/Gara	13–31 Oct 2014	400	65.3	20.3; 12	23.5; 14	21.5; 12	14.5; 8	–		2.7; 1	2.4; 0	–	8.5; 4	–	–	2.0
Ikertalde/GPS	6–13 Oct 2014	490	65.0	19.5	22.9	21.9	15.1	–		2.7	1.3	2.0	9.6	–	–	1.0
Gizaker/Grupo Noticias	12–16 Sep 2014	750	?	16.9; 8	24.8; 15	22.2; 13	12.4; 5	–		3.1; 1	4.0; 1	–	13.6; 8	–	–	2.6
2014 EP election	25 May 2014	—N/a	42.7	16.0	17.2	19.5	15.2	–		4.5	6.3	2.9	8.9	1.1	–	2.3
Gizaker/Grupo Noticias	7–10 Jan 2014	940	?	16.4; 9	27.2; 16	23.5; 13	17.9; 10	1.8; 0		4.2; 2	3.5; 1	–	–	–	–	3.7
2012 regional election	21 Oct 2012	—N/a	63.6	18.7	25.5	21.7	19.3	1.6		3.5	2.9	2.7	–	–	–	3.8
2011 general election	20 Nov 2011	—N/a	68.7	27.2	18.8	19.1 (Note: Results for Amaiur.)	23.4	–		2.8	4.1	2.1	–	–	–	3.8
2011 foral election	22 May 2011	—N/a	63.6	26.0; 16	23.7; 13	21.0; 11	16.3; 9	4.1; 2	2.7; 0	1.8; 0	–	–	–	–	–	2.3

=== Biscay ===
Polling firm/Commissioner	Fieldwork date	Sample size	Turnout	PNV	EH Bildu	PSE–EE (PSOE)	PP	EBB	Aralar	UPyD	IU–LV	Equo	Podemos	C's	Irabazi	Lead
2015 foral election	24 May 2015	—N/a	62.6	37.6; 23	18.9; 11	12.5; 7	8.2; 4	–		0.6; 0			14.5; 6	2.1; 0	2.6; 0	18.7
Ikerfel/El Correo	29 Apr–2 May 2015	2,028	?	36.1; 21	17.1; 11	11.6; 7	8.2; 4	–		0.8; 0			14.3; 8	3.2; 0	4.8; 0	19.0
Ikertalde/GPS	22–29 Apr 2015	1,036	68.5	34.0	20.9	14.1	9.7	–		0.4			12.3	3.0	1.5	13.1
Gizaker/Grupo Noticias	20–23 Apr 2015	1,600	65.9	38.8; 21/22	20.1; 11/12	13.2; 7	8.7; 5	–		–			10.4; 6	3.7; 0	–	18.7
Ikertalde/GPS	9–14 Feb 2015	1,036	69.0	34.0	20.5	14.0	9.5	–		1.0	2.0	–	14.5	–	–	13.5
Ikerfel/El Correo	7–13 Jan 2015	1,170	?	34.3; 20	13.2; 8	10.9; 6	8.2; 4	–		1.9; 0	5.0; 1	–	21.2; 12	1.0; 0	–	13.1
Gizaker/Biscay Deputation	15–18 Dec 2014	1,600	74.4	37.8; 21/22	20.3; 11/12	14.4; 7/8	9.8; 4/5	1.2		1.2; 0	1.2; 0	–	11.8; 5/7	–	–	17.5
Torrene Consulting/Gara	13–31 Oct 2014	400	66.6	36.8; 21	21.6; 12	15.1; 8	7.9; 3	–		–	3.6; 1	–	12.2; 6	–	–	15.2
Ikertalde/GPS	6–13 Oct 2014	1,106	66.0	35.9	21.6	13.8	9.4	–		2.0	1.8	1.0	9.5	–	–	14.3
2014 EP election	25 May 2014	—N/a	44.3	31.8	19.9	13.6	10.0	–		3.2	5.7	1.4	6.7	0.8	–	11.9
Gizaker/Biscay Deputation	12–20 Mar 2014	1,600	?	39.8; 24	22.3; 13	16.6; 9	10.5; 5	2.6; 0		–	3.1; 0	–	–	–	–	17.5
2012 regional election	21 Oct 2012	—N/a	64.5	37.9	21.2	18.7	11.7	1.6		1.8	2.7	0.8	–	–	–	16.7
2011 general election	20 Nov 2011	—N/a	68.1	32.6	19.2	21.4	17.7	–		1.7	3.8	1.2	–	–	–	11.2
2011 foral election	22 May 2011	—N/a	64.0	37.2; 22	21.0; 12	16.7; 9	13.8; 8	3.5; 0	2.7; 0	0.6; 0	–	–	–	–	–	16.2

=== Gipuzkoa ===
Polling firm/Commissioner	Fieldwork date	Sample size	Turnout	EH Bildu	PNV	PSE–EE (PSOE)	PP	Aralar	EBB	UPyD	IU–LV	Equo	Podemos	C's	Irabazi	Lead
2015 foral election	24 May 2015	—N/a	64.9	28.8; 17	31.6; 18	16.5; 9	5.4; 1		–	0.3; 0			12.1; 6	1.5; 0	2.4; 0	2.8
Ikerfel/El Correo	29 Apr–2 May 2015	1,958	?	32.7; 19	28.6; 16	12.4; 7	6.4; 2		–	0.6; 0			13.0; 7	2.0; 0	4.2; 0	4.1
Ikertalde/GPS	22–29 Apr 2015	616	68.0	31.0	26.4	15.1	8.2		–	0.2			11.1	1.0	2.5	4.6
Gizaker/Grupo Noticias	14–18 Apr 2015	1,500	66.2	34.5; 20	31.8; 20	13.8; 7	5.0; 1		–	–			8.5; 3	1.3; 0	2.7; 0	2.7
Ikertalde/GPS	9–14 Feb 2015	588	68.0	29.5	27.5	14.0	8.5		–	1.0	2.0	–	13.5	–	–	2.0
Ikerfel/El Correo	7–13 Jan 2015	1,052	?	27.2; 16	25.9; 16	11.7; 7	5.3; 2		–	2.4; 0	4.6; 0	–	19.4; 10	0.7; 0	–	1.3
Torrene Consulting/Gara	13–31 Oct 2014	600	61.0	30.9; 17/19	24.5; 14	16.1; 8/9	8.6; 4		–	–	1.7; 0	–	13.3; 6/7	–	–	6.3
Ikertalde/GPS	6–13 Oct 2014	602	64.0	32.9	25.8	14.1	8.2		–	1.5	2.0	1.0	8.5	–	–	7.1
2014 EP election	25 May 2014	—N/a	41.4	31.1	24.5	13.7	7.9		–	3.0	5.0	1.3	6.4	0.7	–	6.6
2012 regional election	21 Oct 2012	—N/a	63.3	31.8	31.6	19.0	8.4		1.4	1.4	2.7	0.7	–	–	–	0.2
2011 general election	20 Nov 2011	—N/a	65.5	34.8	22.4	21.0	13.7		–	1.5	3.4	1.2	–	–	–	12.4
2011 foral election	22 May 2011	—N/a	62.7	34.6; 22	23.5; 14	17.2; 10	10.0; 4	5.0; 1	2.6; 0	0.7; 0	–	–	–	–	–	11.1
