= 2011 Spanish local elections in the Basque Country =

This article presents the results breakdown of the local elections held in the Basque Country on 22 May 2011. The following tables show detailed results in the autonomous community's most populous municipalities, sorted alphabetically.

== City control ==
The following table lists party control in the most populous municipalities, including provincial capitals (shown in bold). Gains for a party are displayed with the cell's background shaded in that party's colour.

Municipality	Population	Previous control	New control
Barakaldo	99,321	Socialist Party of the Basque Country (PSE–EE (PSOE))	Socialist Party of the Basque Country (PSE–EE (PSOE))
Basauri	42,452	Socialist Party of the Basque Country (PSE–EE (PSOE))	Basque Nationalist Party (EAJ/PNV)
**Bilbao**	353,187	Basque Nationalist Party (EAJ/PNV)	Basque Nationalist Party (EAJ/PNV)
**Donostia-San Sebastián**	185,506	Socialist Party of the Basque Country (PSE–EE (PSOE))	Gather (Bildu)
Errenteria	39,020	Socialist Party of the Basque Country (PSE–EE (PSOE))	Gather (Bildu)
Getxo	80,277	Basque Nationalist Party (EAJ/PNV)	Basque Nationalist Party (EAJ/PNV)
Irun	60,938	Socialist Party of the Basque Country (PSE–EE (PSOE))	Socialist Party of the Basque Country (PSE–EE (PSOE))
Portugalete	47,856	Socialist Party of the Basque Country (PSE–EE (PSOE))	Socialist Party of the Basque Country (PSE–EE (PSOE))
Santurtzi	47,101	Basque Nationalist Party (EAJ/PNV)	Basque Nationalist Party (EAJ/PNV)
**Vitoria-Gasteiz**	238,247	Socialist Party of the Basque Country (PSE–EE (PSOE))	People's Party (PP)

== Municipalities ==
=== Barakaldo ===
Population: 99,321

← Summary of the 22 May 2011 City Council of Barakaldo election results →
Parties and alliances	Popular vote			Seats	
Parties and alliances	Votes	%	±pp	Total	+/−
Socialist Party of the Basque Country–Basque Country Left (PSE–EE (PSOE))	13,168	29.08	−12.07	8	−3
Basque Nationalist Party (EAJ/PNV)	11,283	24.92	+4.05	7	+2
People's Party (PP)	7,908	17.47	+1.02	5	+1
Gather–Basque Solidarity–Alternative (Bildu–EA–Alternatiba)^{1}	6,959	15.37	+2.81	4	+1
United Left–Greens (EB–B)	2,759	6.09	−1.30	1	−1
Aralar (Aralar)	929	2.05	New	0	±0
For a Fairer World (PUM+J)	525	1.16	New	0	±0
Communist Unification of Spain (UCE)	270	0.60	New	0	±0
Social and Basque Party (PSyV)	152	0.34	New	0	±0
Blank ballots	1,323	2.92	+1.33		
Total	45,276			25	±0
Valid votes	45,276	98.31	−0.78		
Invalid votes	780	1.69	+0.78		
Votes cast / turnout	46,056	56.46	−0.12		
Abstentions	35,521	43.54	+0.12		
Registered voters	81,577				
Sources
Footnotes: ^{1} Gather–Basque Solidarity–Alternative results are compared to the combined totals of Basque Nationalist Action and Basque Solidarity in the 2007 election.

=== Basauri ===
Population: 42,452

← Summary of the 22 May 2011 City Council of Basauri election results →
Parties and alliances	Popular vote			Seats	
Parties and alliances	Votes	%	±pp	Total	+/−
Basque Nationalist Party (EAJ/PNV)	6,904	32.23	+0.88	8	+1
Socialist Party of the Basque Country–Basque Country Left (PSE–EE (PSOE))	6,751	31.52	−9.00	7	−2
Gather–Basque Solidarity–Alternative (Bildu–EA–Alternatiba)^{1}	3,280	15.31	+11.44	3	+3
People's Party (PP)	2,615	12.21	−1.55	3	±0
United Left–Greens (EB–B)^{2}	912	4.26	n/a	0	−1
Aralar (Aralar)^{2}	531	2.48	n/a	0	−1
Blank ballots	428	2.00	+0.34		
Total	21,421			21	±0
Valid votes	21,421	98.67	+7.04		
Invalid votes	288	1.33	−7.04		
Votes cast / turnout	21,709	61.73	+3.33		
Abstentions	13,457	38.27	−3.33		
Registered voters	35,166				
Sources
Footnotes: ^{1} Gather–Basque Solidarity–Alternative results are compared to Basque Solidarity totals in the 2007 election.; ^{2} Within the United Left–Greens–Aralar alliance in the 2007 election.

=== Bilbao ===
Population: 353,187

← Summary of the 22 May 2011 City Council of Bilbao election results →
Parties and alliances	Popular vote			Seats	
Parties and alliances	Votes	%	±pp	Total	+/−
Basque Nationalist Party (EAJ/PNV)	74,377	44.16	+2.93	15	+2
People's Party (PP)	29,038	17.24	−5.18	6	−1
Gather–Basque Solidarity–Alternative (Bildu–EA–Alternatiba)^{1}	23,932	14.21	+11.51	4	+4
Socialist Party of the Basque Country–Basque Country Left (PSE–EE (PSOE))	22,650	13.45	−8.59	4	−3
United Left–Greens (EB–B)^{2}	5,695	3.38	n/a	0	−2
Aralar (Aralar)^{2}	3,214	1.91	n/a	0	±0
The Greens (B/LV)	1,875	1.11	+0.26	0	±0
Union, Progress and Democracy (UPyD)	1,812	1.08	New	0	±0
For a Fairer World (PUM+J)	910	0.54	+0.25	0	±0
Anti-Bullfighting Party Against Mistreatment of Animals (PACMA/ZAAAA)	810	0.48	New	0	±0
Humanist Party (PH)	256	0.15	+0.01	0	±0
Family and Life Party (PFyV)	248	0.15	New	0	±0
Internationalist Socialist Workers' Party (POSI)	199	0.12	New	0	±0
Communist Unification of Spain (UCE)	178	0.11	New	0	±0
Carlist Party of the Basque Country (EKA)	91	0.05	−0.04	0	±0
Blank ballots	3,140	1.86	+0.27		
Total	168,425			29	±0
Valid votes	168,425	99.09	+6.57		
Invalid votes	1,546	0.91	−6.57		
Votes cast / turnout	169,971	61.14	+4.10		
Abstentions	108,028	38.86	−4.10		
Registered voters	277,999				
Sources
Footnotes: ^{1} Gather–Basque Solidarity–Alternative results are compared to Basque Solidarity totals in the 2007 election.; ^{2} Within the United Left–Greens–Aralar alliance in the 2007 election.

=== Donostia-San Sebastián ===
Population: 185,506

← Summary of the 22 May 2011 City Council of Donostia-San Sebastián election results →
Parties and alliances	Popular vote			Seats	
Parties and alliances	Votes	%	±pp	Total	+/−
Gather–Basque Solidarity–Alternative (Bildu–EA–Alternatiba)^{1}	21,110	24.29	+15.96	8	+6
Socialist Party of the Basque Country–Basque Country Left (PSE–EE (PSOE))	19,666	22.63	−14.80	7	−4
People's Party (PP)	16,502	18.99	−2.38	6	±0
Basque Nationalist Party (EAJ/PNV)	15,587	17.93	+0.73	6	+1
Aralar (Aralar)^{2}	3,732	4.29	n/a	0	−1
United Left–Greens (EB–B)^{2}	2,283	2.63	n/a	0	−2
Many with one Goal (H1!)	1,407	1.62	New	0	±0
Union, Progress and Democracy (UPyD)	1,284	1.48	New	0	±0
The Greens (B/LV)	571	0.66	New	0	±0
For a Fairer World (PUM+J)	555	0.64	New	0	±0
Anti-Bullfighting Party Against Mistreatment of Animals (PACMA/ZAAAA)	507	0.58	New	0	±0
The Greens–Green Group (LV–GV)	506	0.58	New	0	±0
We, the Women of the Plaza (Plazandreok)	453	0.52	−0.27	0	±0
Independent Liberal Party (PLIn)	402	0.46	New	0	±0
Full Citizenship (Denok Hiritar–Ciudadanía Plena)	22	0.03	New	0	±0
Blank ballots	2,334	2.69	−0.41		
Total	86,921			27	±0
Valid votes	86,921	98.93	+11.86		
Invalid votes	941	1.07	−11.86		
Votes cast / turnout	87,862	59.55	+4.69		
Abstentions	59,682	40.45	−4.69		
Registered voters	147,544				
Sources
Footnotes: ^{1} Gather–Basque Solidarity–Alternative results are compared to Basque Solidarity totals in the 2007 election.; ^{2} Within the United Left–Greens–Aralar alliance in the 2007 election.

=== Errenteria ===
Population: 39,020

← Summary of the 22 May 2011 City Council of Errenteria election results →
Parties and alliances	Popular vote			Seats	
Parties and alliances	Votes	%	±pp	Total	+/−
Gather–Basque Solidarity–Alternative (Bildu–EA–Alternatiba)^{1}	6,301	35.81	+5.96	8	+1
Socialist Party of the Basque Country–Basque Country Left (PSE–EE (PSOE))	4,970	28.24	−8.79	7	−1
Basque Nationalist Party (EAJ/PNV)	2,232	12.68	+0.55	3	+1
People's Party (PP)	1,579	8.97	+0.66	2	±0
United Left–Greens (EB–B)^{2}	952	5.41	n/a	1	±0
Aralar (Aralar)^{2}	515	2.93	n/a	0	−1
Many with one Goal (H1!)	440	2.50	New	0	±0
For a Fairer World (PUM+J)	213	1.21	New	0	±0
Blank ballots	395	2.24	+0.47		
Total	17,597			21	±0
Valid votes	17,597	98.85	−0.52		
Invalid votes	205	1.15	+0.52		
Votes cast / turnout	17,802	56.92	+3.47		
Abstentions	13,474	43.08	−3.47		
Registered voters	31,276				
Sources
Footnotes: ^{1} Gather–Basque Solidarity–Alternative results are compared to the combined totals of Basque Nationalist Action and Basque Solidarity in the 2007 election.; ^{2} Within the United Left–Greens–Aralar alliance in the 2007 election.

=== Getxo ===
Population: 80,277

← Summary of the 22 May 2011 City Council of Getxo election results →
Parties and alliances	Popular vote			Seats	
Parties and alliances	Votes	%	±pp	Total	+/−
Basque Nationalist Party (EAJ/PNV)	14,182	32.92	−2.18	10	±0
People's Party (PP)	12,982	30.13	−2.99	9	−1
Gather–Basque Solidarity–Alternative (Bildu–EA–Alternatiba)^{1}	7,048	16.36	+12.38	4	+4
Socialist Party of the Basque Country–Basque Country Left (PSE–EE (PSOE))	4,170	9.68	−6.14	2	−2
United Left–Greens (EB–B)^{2}	1,067	2.48	n/a	0	−1
Aralar (Aralar)^{2}	863	2.00	n/a	0	±0
Independents of Getxo (IG/GI)	757	1.76	New	0	±0
Union, Progress and Democracy (UPyD)	593	1.38	New	0	±0
For a Fairer World (PUM+J)	360	0.84	New	0	±0
Social and Basque Party (PSyV)	71	0.16	New	0	±0
Blank ballots	987	2.29	+0.11		
Total	43,080			25	±0
Valid votes	43,080	99.04	+7.40		
Invalid votes	419	0.96	−7.40		
Votes cast / turnout	43,499	67.72	+5.05		
Abstentions	20,733	32.28	−5.05		
Registered voters	64,232				
Sources
Footnotes: ^{1} Gather–Basque Solidarity–Alternative results are compared to Basque Solidarity totals in the 2007 election.; ^{2} Within the United Left–Greens–Aralar alliance in the 2007 election.

=== Irun ===
Population: 60,938

← Summary of the 22 May 2011 City Council of Irun election results →
Parties and alliances	Popular vote			Seats	
Parties and alliances	Votes	%	±pp	Total	+/−
Socialist Party of the Basque Country–Basque Country Left (PSE–EE (PSOE))	7,904	30.85	−8.77	9	−3
Basque Nationalist Party (EAJ/PNV)	4,583	17.89	+2.57	5	+1
Gather–Basque Solidarity–Alternative (Bildu–EA–Alternatiba)^{1}	4,406	17.20	+2.27	5	+2
People's Party (PP)	4,393	17.15	+1.06	5	+1
United Left–Greens (EB–B)^{2}	1,556	6.07	n/a	1	−1
Union, Progress and Democracy (UPyD)	705	2.75	New	0	±0
Aralar (Aralar)^{2}	682	2.66	n/a	0	±0
Many with one Goal (H1!)	525	2.05	New	0	±0
Blank ballots	865	3.38	+1.41		
Total	25,619			25	±0
Valid votes	25,619	98.18	−0.97		
Invalid votes	475	1.82	+0.97		
Votes cast / turnout	26,094	55.69	+2.34		
Abstentions	20,765	44.31	−2.34		
Registered voters	46,859				
Sources
Footnotes: ^{1} Gather–Basque Solidarity–Alternative results are compared to the combined totals of Basque Nationalist Action and Basque Solidarity in the 2007 election.; ^{2} Within the United Left–Greens–Aralar alliance in the 2007 election.

=== Portugalete ===
Population: 47,856

← Summary of the 22 May 2011 City Council of Portugalete election results →
Parties and alliances	Popular vote			Seats	
Parties and alliances	Votes	%	±pp	Total	+/−
Socialist Party of the Basque Country–Basque Country Left (PSE–EE (PSOE))	8,526	36.13	−1.54	8	−1
Basque Nationalist Party (EAJ/PNV)	5,825	24.69	−7.42	6	−1
Gather–Basque Solidarity–Alternative (Bildu–EA–Alternatiba)^{1}	3,290	13.94	+11.46	3	+3
People's Party (PP)	3,169	13.43	−2.38	3	±0
United Left–Greens (EB–B)^{2}	1,207	5.12	n/a	1	−1
The Greens (B/LV)	394	1.67	New	0	±0
Aralar (Aralar)^{2}	364	1.54	n/a	0	±0
For a Fairer World (PUM+J)	167	0.71	New	0	±0
Social and Basque Party (PSyV)	115	0.49	New	0	±0
Blank ballots	539	2.28	+0.31		
Total	23,596			21	±0
Valid votes	23,596	98.60	+5.37		
Invalid votes	334	1.40	−5.37		
Votes cast / turnout	23,930	59.98	+0.76		
Abstentions	15,968	32.28	−0.76		
Registered voters	39,898				
Sources
Footnotes: ^{1} Gather–Basque Solidarity–Alternative results are compared to Basque Solidarity totals in the 2007 election.; ^{2} Within the United Left–Greens–Aralar alliance in the 2007 election.

=== Santurtzi ===
Population: 47,101

← Summary of the 22 May 2011 City Council of Santurtzi election results →
Parties and alliances	Popular vote			Seats	
Parties and alliances	Votes	%	±pp	Total	+/−
Basque Nationalist Party (EAJ/PNV)	11,220	48.54	+3.18	12	+1
Socialist Party of the Basque Country–Basque Country Left (PSE–EE (PSOE))	4,302	18.61	−13.55	4	−3
Gather–Basque Solidarity–Alternative (Bildu–EA–Alternatiba)^{1}	3,184	13.77	+12.27	3	+3
People's Party (PP)	2,143	9.27	−2.76	2	±0
United Left–Greens (EB–B)	860	3.72	−3.53	0	−1
The Greens–Green Group (LV–GV)	356	1.54	New	0	±0
Aralar (Aralar)	337	1.46	New	0	±0
Social and Basque Party (PSyV)	194	0.84	New	0	±0
For a Fairer World (PUM+J)	113	0.49	New	0	±0
Blank ballots	406	1.76	+0.06		
Total	23,115			21	±0
Valid votes	23,115	98.74	+7.49		
Invalid votes	295	1.26	−7.49		
Votes cast / turnout	23,410	60.61	+1.11		
Abstentions	15,214	39.39	−1.11		
Registered voters	38,624				
Sources
Footnotes: ^{1} Gather–Basque Solidarity–Alternative results are compared to Basque Solidarity totals in the 2007 election.

=== Vitoria-Gasteiz ===
Population: 238,247

← Summary of the 22 May 2011 City Council of Vitoria-Gasteiz election results →
Parties and alliances	Popular vote			Seats	
Parties and alliances	Votes	%	±pp	Total	+/−
People's Party (PP)	32,300	29.19	−0.55	9	±0
Basque Nationalist Party (EAJ/PNV)	21,143	19.11	−2.78	6	±0
Socialist Party of the Basque Country–Basque Country Left (PSE–EE (PSOE))	20,727	18.73	−12.64	6	−3
Gather–Basque Solidarity–Alternative (Bildu–EA–Alternatiba)^{1}	19,677	17.78	+12.18	6	+5
United Left–Greens (EB–B)^{2}	4,916	4.44	n/a	0	−2
Aralar (Aralar)^{2}	2,571	2.32	n/a	0	±0
Union, Progress and Democracy (UPyD)	2,522	2.28	New	0	±0
The Greens (B/LV)	1,483	1.34	New	0	±0
For a Fairer World (PUM+J)	1,056	0.95	+0.29	0	±0
Anti-Bullfighting Party Against Mistreatment of Animals (PACMA/ZAAAA)	550	0.50	−0.30	0	±0
Family and Life Party (PFyV)	253	0.23	New	0	±0
Communist Unification of Spain (UCE)	214	0.19	New	0	±0
Welcome (Ongi Etorri)	174	0.16	New	0	±0
Blank ballots	3,065	2.77	+1.02		
Total	110,651			27	±0
Valid votes	110,651	97.86	+4.15		
Invalid votes	2,415	2.14	−4.15		
Votes cast / turnout	113,066	61.51	−0.75		
Abstentions	70,741	38.49	+0.75		
Registered voters	183,807				
Sources
Footnotes: ^{1} Gather–Basque Solidarity–Alternative results are compared to Basque Solidarity totals in the 2007 election.; ^{2} Within the United Left–Greens–Aralar alliance in the 2007 election.
