= 2011 Basque foral elections =

Elections in the Spanish region of the Basque Country

Foral elections were held in the Basque Country on 22 May 2011 to elect the 9th General Assemblies of Álava, Biscay and Guipúzcoa. All 153 seats in the three General Assemblies were up for election. They were held concurrently with regional elections in thirteen autonomous communities and local elections all across Spain.

== Overall ==
← Summary of the 22 May 2011 Basque foral election results →
Parties and alliances	Popular vote			Seats	
Parties and alliances	Votes	%	±pp	Total	+/−
Basque Nationalist Party (EAJ/PNV)	333,543	30.93	−3.12	49	−4
Gather–Basque Solidarity–Alternative (Bildu–EA–Alternatiba)^{1}	273,273	25.34	+14.90	45	+30
Socialist Party of the Basque Country–Basque Country Left (PSE–EE (PSOE))	180,928	16.78	−9.39	28	−16
People's Party (PP)	154,361	14.32	−2.66	28	−1
Aralar (Aralar)^{2}	37,242	3.45	n/a	1	−3
United Left–Greens (EB–B)^{2}	35,746	3.32	n/a	2	−6
The Greens (B/LV)	11,351	1.05	+0.53	0	±0
Many with one Goal (H1!)	8,662	0.80	New	0	±0
Union, Progress and Democracy (UPyD)	8,630	0.80	New	0	±0
For a Fairer World (PUM+J)	6,687	0.62	New	0	±0
Social and Basque Party (PSyV)	1,742	0.16	New	0	±0
We, the Women of the Plaza (Plazandreok)	586	0.05	−0.11	0	±0
Independent Liberal Party (PLIn)	470	0.04	New	0	±0
Carlist Party of the Basque Country (EKA)	253	0.02	−0.03	0	±0
Humanist Party (PH)	107	0.01	−0.10	0	±0
Blank ballots	24,703	2.29	+0.18		
Total	1,078,284			153	±0
Valid votes	1,078,284	98.54	+11.07		
Invalid votes	16,009	1.46	−11.07		
Votes cast / turnout	1,094,293	63.55	+2.90		
Abstentions	627,749	36.45	−2.90		
Registered voters	1,722,042				
Sources
Footnotes: ^{1} Gather–Basque Solidarity–Alternative results are compared to the combined totals of Basque Solidarity and Basque Nationalist Action in the 2007 elections.; ^{2} Within the United Left–Greens–Aralar alliance in the 2007 elections.

Popular vote
EAJ/PNV	30.93%
Bildu–EA–A	25.34%
PSE–EE (PSOE)	16.78%
PP	14.32%
Aralar	3.45%
EB–B	3.32%
B/LV	1.05%
Others	2.52%
Blank ballots	2.29%

== Deputation control ==
The following table lists party control in the foral deputations. Gains for a party are highlighted in that party's colour.

Province	Population	Previous control	New control
Álava	317,352	Basque Nationalist Party (EAJ/PNV)	People's Party (PP)
Biscay	1,153,724	Basque Nationalist Party (EAJ/PNV)	Basque Nationalist Party (EAJ/PNV)
Guipúzcoa	707,263	Basque Nationalist Party (EAJ/PNV)	Gather (Bildu)

== Historical territories ==
=== Álava ===
← Summary of the 22 May 2011 General Assembly of Álava election results →
Parties and alliances	Popular vote			Seats	
Parties and alliances	Votes	%	±pp	Total	+/−
People's Party (PP)	39,652	25.96	+0.03	16	+1
Basque Nationalist Party (EAJ/PNV)	36,224	23.72	−1.74	13	−1
Gather–Basque Solidarity–Alternative (Bildu–EA–Alternatiba)^{1}	32,004	20.95	+6.71	11	+5
Socialist Party of the Basque Country–Basque Country Left (PSE–EE (PSOE))	24,912	16.31	−9.51	9	−5
United Left–Greens (EB–B)^{2}	6,253	4.09	n/a	2	+1
Aralar (Aralar)^{2}	4,174	2.73	n/a	0	−1
Union, Progress and Democracy (UPyD)	2,747	1.80	New	0	±0
For a Fairer World (PUM+J)	1,939	1.27	New	0	±0
The Greens (B/LV)	650	0.43	New	0	±0
Blank ballots	4,178	2.74	+0.93		
Total	152,733			51	±0
Valid votes	152,733	97.66	+0.67		
Invalid votes	3,657	2.34	−0.67		
Votes cast / turnout	156,390	63.63	−0.19		
Abstentions	89,391	36.37	+0.19		
Registered voters	245,781				
Sources
Footnotes: ^{1} Gather–Basque Solidarity–Alternative results are compared to the combined totals of Basque Nationalist Action and Basque Solidarity in the 2007 election.; ^{2} Within the United Left–Greens–Aralar alliance in the 2007 election.

=== Biscay ===
← Summary of the 22 May 2011 General Assembly of Biscay election results →
Parties and alliances	Popular vote			Seats	
Parties and alliances	Votes	%	±pp	Total	+/−
Basque Nationalist Party (EAJ/PNV)	216,455	37.22	−2.86	22	−1
Gather–Basque Solidarity–Alternative (Bildu–EA–Alternatiba)^{1}	122,169	21.01	+12.93	12	+10
Socialist Party of the Basque Country–Basque Country Left (PSE–EE (PSOE))	97,008	16.68	−8.13	9	−5
People's Party (PP)	80,215	13.79	−2.47	8	±0
United Left–Greens (EB–B)^{2}	20,479	3.52	n/a	0	−3
Aralar (Aralar)^{2}	15,838	2.72	n/a	0	−1
The Greens (B/LV)	7,439	1.28	+0.54	0	±0
For a Fairer World (PUM+J)	3,490	0.60	New	0	±0
Union, Progress and Democracy (UPyD)	3,397	0.58	New	0	±0
Social and Basque Party (PSyV)	1,742	0.30	New	0	±0
Carlist Party of the Basque Country (EKA)	253	0.04	−0.05	0	±0
Humanist Party (PH)	107	0.02	−0.18	0	±0
Blank ballots	12,930	2.22	+0.36		
Total	581,522			51	±0
Valid votes	581,522	98.59	+8.42		
Invalid votes	8,305	1.41	−8.42		
Votes cast / turnout	589,827	64.02	+3.67		
Abstentions	331,556	35.98	−3.67		
Registered voters	921,383				
Sources
Footnotes: ^{1} Gather–Basque Solidarity–Alternative results are compared to the combined totals Basque Solidarity and Basque Nationalist Action in the 2007 election.; ^{2} Within the United Left–Greens–Aralar alliance in the 2007 election.

=== Guipúzcoa ===
← Summary of the 22 May 2011 General Assembly of Guipúzcoa election results →
Parties and alliances	Popular vote			Seats	
Parties and alliances	Votes	%	±pp	Total	+/−
Gather–Basque Solidarity–Alternative (Bildu–EA–Alternatiba)^{1}	119,100	34.62	+21.71	22	+15
Basque Nationalist Party (EAJ/PNV)	80,864	23.50	−3.64	14	−2
Socialist Party of the Basque Country–Basque Country Left (PSE–EE (PSOE))	59,008	17.15	−11.91	10	−6
People's Party (PP)	34,494	10.03	−3.21	4	−2
Aralar (Aralar)^{2}	17,230	5.01	n/a	1	−1
United Left–Greens (EB–B)^{2}	9,014	2.62	n/a	0	−4
Many with one Goal (H1!)	8,662	2.52	New	0	±0
The Greens (B/LV)	3,262	0.95	+0.57	0	±0
Union, Progress and Democracy (UPyD)	2,486	0.72	New	0	±0
For a Fairer World (PUM+J)	1,258	0.37	New	0	±0
We, the Women of the Plaza (Plazandreok)	586	0.17	−0.41	0	±0
Independent Liberal Party (PLIn)	470	0.14	New	0	±0
Blank ballots	7,595	2.21	−0.56		
Total	344,029			51	±0
Valid votes	344,029	98.84	+20.25		
Invalid votes	4,047	1.16	−20.25		
Votes cast / turnout	348,076	62.73	+3.13		
Abstentions	206,802	37.27	−3.13		
Registered voters	554,878				
Sources
Footnotes: ^{1} Gather–Basque Solidarity–Alternative results are compared to Basque Solidarity totals in the 2007 election.; ^{2} Within the United Left–Greens–Aralar alliance in the 2007 election.
