= Oskar Matute =

Spanish politician (born 1972)

Oskar Matute MP
- Matute in June 2023

Member of the Congress of Deputies of Spain
- Incumbent
- Assumed office 18 July 2016
- Constituency: Biscay

Member of the Basque Parliament
- In office 9 January 2002 – 19 July 2004
- Preceded by: Javier Madrazo
- Constituency: Biscay
- In office 13 July 2005 – 6 January 2009
- Preceded by: Javier Madrazo
- Constituency: Biscay
- In office 20 November 2012 – 15 July 2016
- Succeeded by: Jone Goirizelaia
- Constituency: Biscay

Personal details
- Born: Oskar Matute García de Jalón; 5 October 1972 (age 54) Barakaldo, Basque Country, Spain
- Party: Alternatiba (since 2009); EH Bildu (since 2012)
- Other political affiliations: United Left–Greens (until 2009)
- Education: University of the Basque Country

Oskar Matute García de Jalón (born 5 October 1972) is a Spanish politician and a member of the Congress of Deputies of Spain. He was previously a member of the Basque Parliament.

== Early life ==
Matute was born on 5 October 1972 in Barakaldo, Basque Country. He grew up in Bilbao but currently lives in Barakaldo. He has degree in business studies from the University of the Basque Country.

== Career ==
Matute was an activist in the movement against compulsory military service in Spain and the pacifist Elkarri movement. He was also a member of the Viento Sur and Ezker Gogoa foundations, and Lokarri and Euskadiko Langile Komisioak.

Matute was co-ordinator for the presidency of the United Left–Greens (Ezker Batua–Berdeak, EB–B) and the federal presidency of the United Left (IU). He became a member of the EB's executive representing the Ekaitza faction. Ekaitza had been formed in 1993 by those supporting Basque sovereignty, the right to self-determination, alternative social movements and citizen participation in political decisions. Following the 1998 Estella Pact (of which EB–B was a signatory), Ekaitza transformed into Batzen with Matute as its spokesperson. Matute was also a member of Espacio Alternativo (EA, Alternative Space), part of IU.

At the 2001 regional election Matute was placed 2nd on the EB–B's list of candidates in the Province of Biscay but the party only managed to win one seat in the province and as a result he failed to get elected to the Basque Parliament. However he was appointed to the Basque Parliament in January 2002 following the resignation of Javier Madrazo. At the 2005 regional election Matute was placed 2nd on the EB–B's list of candidates in the Province of Biscay but, again, the party only managed to win one seat in the province and as a result he failed to get re-elected to the Basque Parliament. However he was re-appointed to the Basque Parliament in July 2005 following the resignation of Javier Madrazo.

At the EB–B's 7th Assembly in June 2008, held at the Euskalduna Conference Centre and Concert Hall in Bilbao, Matute challenged incumbent Javier Madrazo for the party's general co-ordinator position but was defeated after only receiving 22% of the votes. Matute founded Alternatiba Eraikitzen (Alternative in Progress) a socio-political organisation which became the Alternatiba (Alternative) political party. He left EB–B in April 2009. Alternatiba joined Bildu when it was founded in 2011.

At the 2011 local elections Matute was placed 25th on the Bildu's list of candidates in Barakaldo but the alliance only managed to win four seats in the municipality and as a result he failed to get elected. He contested the 2012 regional election as an EH Bildu electoral alliance candidate in the Province of Biscay and was re-elected to the Basque Parliament.

Matute contested the 2016 general election as an EH Bildu candidate in the Province of Biscay and was elected to the Congress of Deputies. He resigned from the Basque Parliament in July 2016. He was re-elected at the 2019 general election.

Matute is national spokesperson for Alternatiba and national co-speaker for EH Bildu.

== Electoral history ==
Electoral history of Oskar Matute
Election	Constituency	Party	Alliance	No.	Result
2001 regional	Province of Biscay	United Left–Greens		2	Not elected
2005 regional	Province of Biscay	United Left–Greens		2	Not elected
2011 local	Barakaldo	Alternatiba	Bildu	25	Not elected
2012 regional	Province of Biscay	Alternatiba	EH Bildu	5	Elected
2016 general	Province of Biscay	Alternatiba	EH Bildu	1	Elected
2019 general	Province of Biscay	Alternatiba	EH Bildu	1	Elected
