= 2015 Spanish local elections in the Basque Country =

This article presents the results breakdown of the local elections held in the Basque Country on 24 May 2015. The following tables show detailed results in the autonomous community's most populous municipalities, sorted alphabetically.

== City control ==
The following table lists party control in the most populous municipalities, including provincial capitals (shown in bold). Gains for a party are displayed with the cell's background shaded in that party's colour.

Municipality	Population	Previous control	New control
Barakaldo	100,080	Socialist Party of the Basque Country (PSE–EE (PSOE))	Basque Nationalist Party (EAJ/PNV)
Basauri	41,624	Basque Nationalist Party (EAJ/PNV)	Basque Nationalist Party (EAJ/PNV)
**Bilbao**	346,574	Basque Nationalist Party (EAJ/PNV)	Basque Nationalist Party (EAJ/PNV)
**Donostia/San Sebastián**	186,126	Basque Country Gather (EH Bildu)	Basque Nationalist Party (EAJ/PNV)
Errenteria	39,230	Basque Country Gather (EH Bildu)	Basque Country Gather (EH Bildu)
Getxo	79,544	Basque Nationalist Party (EAJ/PNV)	Basque Nationalist Party (EAJ/PNV)
Irun	61,195	Socialist Party of the Basque Country (PSE–EE (PSOE))	Socialist Party of the Basque Country (PSE–EE (PSOE))
Portugalete	47,117	Socialist Party of the Basque Country (PSE–EE (PSOE))	Socialist Party of the Basque Country (PSE–EE (PSOE))
Santurtzi	46,651	Basque Nationalist Party (EAJ/PNV)	Basque Nationalist Party (EAJ/PNV)
**Vitoria-Gasteiz**	242,082	People's Party (PP)	Basque Nationalist Party (EAJ/PNV)

== Municipalities ==
=== Barakaldo ===
Population: 100,080

← Summary of the 24 May 2015 City Council of Barakaldo election results →
Parties and alliances	Popular vote			Seats	
Parties and alliances	Votes	%	±pp	Total	+/−
Basque Nationalist Party (EAJ/PNV)	12,542	26.94	+2.02	8	+1
Socialist Party of the Basque Country–Basque Country Left (PSE–EE (PSOE))	12,490	26.83	−2.25	8	±0
Basque Country Gather (EH Bildu)^{1}	6,613	14.20	−3.22	4	±0
Winning Barakaldo (Irabazi–Ganar Barakaldo)	5,582	11.99	New	4	+4
People's Party (PP)	4,274	9.18	−8.29	3	−2
Barakaldo Decides (BD)	2,126	4.57	New	0	±0
Zero Cuts (Recortes Cero)	1,093	2.35	New	0	±0
Union, Progress and Democracy (UPyD)	685	1.47	New	0	±0
Vox (Vox)	361	0.78	New	0	±0
United Left–Greens (EB–B)	n/a	n/a	−6.09	0	−1
Blank ballots	795	1.71	−1.21		
Total	46,561			27	+2
Valid votes	46,561	98.55	+0.24		
Invalid votes	686	1.45	−0.24		
Votes cast / turnout	47,247	58.71	+2.25		
Abstentions	33,227	41.29	−2.25		
Registered voters	80,474				
Sources
Footnotes: ^{1} Basque Country Gather results are compared to the combined totals of Gather–Basque Solidarity–Alternative and Aralar in the 2011 election.

=== Basauri ===
Population: 41,624

← Summary of the 24 May 2015 City Council of Basauri election results →
Parties and alliances	Popular vote			Seats	
Parties and alliances	Votes	%	±pp	Total	+/−
Basque Nationalist Party (EAJ/PNV)	8,324	40.65	+8.42	10	+2
Socialist Party of the Basque Country–Basque Country Left (PSE–EE (PSOE))	3,724	18.19	−13.33	4	−3
Basauri Yes (Basauri Bai)	2,930	14.31	New	3	+3
Basque Country Gather (EH Bildu)^{1}	2,648	12.93	−4.86	3	±0
People's Party (PP)	1,551	7.58	−4.63	1	−2
Winning Basauri (Irabazi–Ganar Basauri)	838	4.09	New	0	±0
Humanist Party (PH)	186	0.91	New	0	±0
Blank ballots	274	1.34	−0.66		
Total	20,475			21	±0
Valid votes	20,475	98.77	+0.10		
Invalid votes	256	1.23	−0.10		
Votes cast / turnout	20,731	60.89	−0.84		
Abstentions	13,315	39.11	+0.84		
Registered voters	34,046				
Sources
Footnotes: ^{1} Basque Country Gather results are compared to the combined totals of Gather–Basque Solidarity–Alternative and Aralar in the 2011 election.

=== Bilbao ===
Population: 346,574

← Summary of the 24 May 2015 City Council of Bilbao election results →
Parties and alliances	Popular vote			Seats	
Parties and alliances	Votes	%	±pp	Total	+/−
Basque Nationalist Party (EAJ/PNV)	63,642	39.34	−4.82	13	−2
Basque Country Gather (EH Bildu)^{1}	22,711	14.04	−2.08	4	±0
Socialist Party of the Basque Country–Basque Country Left (PSE–EE (PSOE))	19,361	11.97	−1.48	4	±0
People's Party (PP)	19,190	11.86	−5.38	4	−2
New City Council–Bilbao in Common (UdalBerri)	13,701	8.47	New	2	+2
Let's Win Bilbao (Goazen Bilbao)	10,568	6.53	New	2	+2
Citizens–Party of the Citizenry (C's)	5,701	3.52	New	0	±0
Animalist Party Against Mistreatment of Animals (PACMA/ATTKAA)	1,936	1.20	+0.72	0	±0
Union, Progress and Democracy (UPyD)	1,357	0.84	−0.24	0	±0
Vox–Family and Life Party (Vox–PFyV)^{2}	599	0.37	+0.22	0	±0
Humanist Party (PH)	380	0.23	+0.08	0	±0
Blank ballots	2,628	1.62	−0.24		
Total	161,774			29	±0
Valid votes	161,774	99.08	−0.01		
Invalid votes	1,502	0.92	+0.01		
Votes cast / turnout	163,276	59.33	−1.81		
Abstentions	111,946	40.67	+1.81		
Registered voters	275,222				
Sources
Footnotes: ^{1} Basque Country Gather results are compared to the combined totals of Gather–Basque Solidarity–Alternative and Aralar in the 2011 election.; ^{2} Vox–Family and Life Party results are compared to Family and Life Party totals in the 2011 election.

=== Donostia/San Sebastián ===
Population: 186,126

← Summary of the 24 May 2015 City Council of Donostia/San Sebastián election results →
Parties and alliances	Popular vote			Seats	
Parties and alliances	Votes	%	±pp	Total	+/−
Basque Nationalist Party (EAJ/PNV)	29,029	29.65	+11.72	9	+3
Socialist Party of the Basque Country–Basque Country Left (PSE–EE (PSOE))	24,007	24.52	+1.89	7	±0
Basque Country Gather (EH Bildu)^{1}	20,467	20.91	−7.67	6	−2
People's Party (PP)	9,272	9.47	−9.52	3	−3
Winning Donostia (Irabazi–Ganar Donostia)	6,947	7.10	New	2	+2
Citizens–Party of the Citizenry (C's)	3,642	3.72	New	0	±0
Animalist Party Against Mistreatment of Animals (PACMA/ATTKAA)	1,451	1.48	+0.90	0	±0
We, the Women of the Plaza (PlaZ!)	864	0.88	+0.36	0	±0
Union, Progress and Democracy (UPyD)	675	0.69	−0.79	0	±0
Blank ballots	1,547	1.58	−1.11		
Total	97,901			27	±0
Valid votes	97,901	99.22	+0.29		
Invalid votes	774	0.78	−0.29		
Votes cast / turnout	98,675	66.65	+7.10		
Abstentions	49,377	33.35	−7.10		
Registered voters	148,052				
Sources
Footnotes: ^{1} Basque Country Gather results are compared to the combined totals of Gather–Basque Solidarity–Alternative and Aralar in the 2011 election.

=== Errenteria ===
Population: 39,230

← Summary of the 24 May 2015 City Council of Errenteria election results →
Parties and alliances	Popular vote			Seats	
Parties and alliances	Votes	%	±pp	Total	+/−
Basque Country Gather (EH Bildu)^{1}	5,938	31.82	−6.92	7	−1
Socialist Party of the Basque Country–Basque Country Left (PSE–EE (PSOE))	5,276	28.27	+0.03	7	±0
Winning Errenteria (Errenteria IrabaziZ)	3,518	18.85	New	4	+4
Basque Nationalist Party (EAJ/PNV)	2,725	14.60	+1.92	3	±0
People's Party (PP)	877	4.70	−4.27	0	−2
United Left–Greens (EB–B)	n/a	n/a	−5.41	0	−1
Blank ballots	330	1.77	−0.47		
Total	18,664			21	±0
Valid votes	18,664	98.96	+0.11		
Invalid votes	196	1.04	−0.11		
Votes cast / turnout	18,860	60.83	+3.91		
Abstentions	12,142	39.17	−3.91		
Registered voters	31,002				
Sources
Footnotes: ^{1} Basque Country Gather results are compared to the combined totals of Gather–Basque Solidarity–Alternative and Aralar in the 2011 election.

=== Getxo ===
Population: 79,544

← Summary of the 24 May 2015 City Council of Getxo election results →
Parties and alliances	Popular vote			Seats	
Parties and alliances	Votes	%	±pp	Total	+/−
Basque Nationalist Party (EAJ/PNV)	13,625	34.09	+1.17	9	−1
People's Party (PP)	7,432	18.60	−11.53	5	−4
Getxo Municipal Candidacy (GUK)	5,809	14.53	New	4	+4
Basque Country Gather (EH Bildu)^{1}	5,760	14.41	−3.95	4	±0
Socialist Party of the Basque Country–Basque Country Left (PSE–EE (PSOE))	3,044	7.62	−2.06	2	±0
Citizens–Party of the Citizenry (C's)	2,362	5.91	New	1	+1
Vox–Family and Life Party (Vox–PFyV)	781	1.95	New	0	±0
Union, Progress and Democracy (UPyD)	331	0.83	−0.55	0	±0
Blank ballots	822	2.06	−0.23		
Total	39,966			25	±0
Valid votes	39,966	99.09	+0.05		
Invalid votes	365	0.91	−0.05		
Votes cast / turnout	40,331	63.46	−4.26		
Abstentions	23,218	36.54	+4.26		
Registered voters	63,549				
Sources
Footnotes: ^{1} Basque Country Gather results are compared to the combined totals of Gather–Basque Solidarity–Alternative and Aralar in the 2011 election.

=== Irun ===
Population: 61,195

← Summary of the 24 May 2015 City Council of Irun election results →
Parties and alliances	Popular vote			Seats	
Parties and alliances	Votes	%	±pp	Total	+/−
Socialist Party of the Basque Country–Basque Country Left (PSE–EE (PSOE))	9,405	33.42	+2.57	10	+1
Yes We Can Irun (SPI)	5,137	18.26	New	5	+5
Basque Nationalist Party (EAJ/PNV)	5,133	18.24	+0.35	5	±0
Basque Country Gather (EH Bildu)^{1}	3,491	12.41	−7.45	3	−2
People's Party (PP)	2,197	7.81	−9.34	2	−3
Winning Irun (Irabazi–Ganar Irun)	1,132	4.02	New	0	±0
Citizens–Party of the Citizenry (C's)	1,042	3.70	New	0	±0
Union, Progress and Democracy (UPyD)	239	0.85	−1.90	0	±0
United Left–Greens (EB–B)	n/a	n/a	−6.07	0	−1
Blank ballots	363	1.29	−2.09		
Total	28,139			25	±0
Valid votes	28,139	99.09	+0.91		
Invalid votes	258	0.91	−0.91		
Votes cast / turnout	28,397	60.48	+4.79		
Abstentions	18,558	39.52	−4.79		
Registered voters	46,955				
Sources
Footnotes: ^{1} Basque Country Gather results are compared to the combined totals of Gather–Basque Solidarity–Alternative and Aralar in the 2011 election.

=== Portugalete ===
Population: 47,117

← Summary of the 24 May 2015 City Council of Portugalete election results →
Parties and alliances	Popular vote			Seats	
Parties and alliances	Votes	%	±pp	Total	+/−
Socialist Party of the Basque Country–Basque Country Left (PSE–EE (PSOE))	8,020	33.70	−2.43	9	+1
Basque Nationalist Party (EAJ/PNV)	5,295	22.25	−2.44	5	−1
Awake Portugalete People (Portugaluj@)	3,477	14.61	New	3	+3
Basque Country Gather (EH Bildu)^{1}	2,865	12.04	−3.44	3	±0
People's Party (PP)	1,743	7.32	−6.11	1	−2
Winning Portugalete (Irabazi–Ganar Portugalete)	1,157	4.86	New	0	±0
Party for Freedom–With Clean Hands (PxL)	770	3.24	New	0	±0
Communist Party of the Peoples of Spain (PCPE)	164	0.69	New	0	±0
United Left–Greens (EB–B)	n/a	n/a	−5.12	0	−1
Blank ballots	310	1.30	−0.98		
Total	23,801			21	±0
Valid votes	23,801	98.47	−0.13		
Invalid votes	371	1.53	+0.13		
Votes cast / turnout	24,172	61.97	+1.99		
Abstentions	14,834	38.03	−1.99		
Registered voters	39,006				
Sources
Footnotes: ^{1} Basque Country Gather results are compared to the combined totals of Gather–Basque Solidarity–Alternative and Aralar in the 2011 election.

=== Santurtzi ===
Population: 46,651

← Summary of the 24 May 2015 City Council of Santurtzi election results →
Parties and alliances	Popular vote			Seats	
Parties and alliances	Votes	%	±pp	Total	+/−
Basque Nationalist Party (EAJ/PNV)	9,104	40.16	−8.38	10	−2
Yes We Can Santurtzi (SSPStz)	3,681	16.24	New	4	+4
Basque Country Gather (EH Bildu)^{1}	3,535	15.59	+0.36	3	±0
Socialist Party of the Basque Country–Basque Country Left (PSE–EE (PSOE))	3,465	15.28	−3.33	3	−1
People's Party (PP)	1,354	5.97	−3.30	1	−1
Winning Santurtzi (Irabazi–Ganar Santurtzi)	902	3.98	New	0	±0
Always Santurtzi (Siempre Santurtzi Beti)	306	1.35	New	0	±0
Blank ballots	324	1.43	−0.33		
Total	22,671			21	±0
Valid votes	22,671	98.79	+0.05		
Invalid votes	277	1.21	−0.05		
Votes cast / turnout	22,948	60.48	−0.13		
Abstentions	14,996	39.52	+0.13		
Registered voters	37,944				
Sources
Footnotes: ^{1} Basque Country Gather results are compared to the combined totals of Gather–Basque Solidarity–Alternative and Aralar in the 2011 election.

=== Vitoria-Gasteiz ===
Population: 242,082

← Summary of the 24 May 2015 City Council of Vitoria-Gasteiz election results →
Parties and alliances	Popular vote			Seats	
Parties and alliances	Votes	%	±pp	Total	+/−
People's Party (PP)	35,722	29.80	+0.61	9	±0
Basque Country Gather (EH Bildu)^{1}	23,422	19.54	−0.56	6	±0
Basque Nationalist Party (EAJ/PNV)	19,945	16.64	−2.47	5	−1
Socialist Party of the Basque Country–Basque Country Left (PSE–EE (PSOE))	14,313	11.94	−6.79	4	−2
Adding Up (Sumando–Hemen Gaude)	10,390	8.67	New	2	+2
Winning Gasteiz (Irabazi–Ganar Gasteiz)	6,130	5.11	New	1	+1
Citizens–Party of the Citizenry (C's)	3,835	3.20	New	0	±0
Zero Cuts (Recortes Cero)	1,124	0.94	New	0	±0
Gastoria Vitoria-Gasteiz Citizen Platform (GVG)	1,006	0.84	New	0	±0
Union, Progress and Democracy (UPyD)	1,000	0.83	−1.45	0	±0
Blank Seats (EB/AZ)	842	0.70	New	0	±0
Vox (Vox)	346	0.29	New	0	±0
Welcome (Ongi Etorri)	295	0.25	+0.09	0	±0
Blank ballots	1,485	1.24	−1.53		
Total	119,855			27	±0
Valid votes	119,855	98.70	+0.84		
Invalid votes	1,576	1.30	−0.84		
Votes cast / turnout	121,431	64.76	+3.25		
Abstentions	66,064	35.24	−3.25		
Registered voters	187,495				
Sources
Footnotes: ^{1} Basque Country Gather results are compared to the combined totals of Gather–Basque Solidarity–Alternative and Aralar in the 2011 election.
