= 2011 Spanish local elections =

- 22 May 2011 (Note: By-elections were held on 20 November 2011 in those constituencies where results were annulled by a final sentence following an electoral petition, or where elections were not held due to a lack of candidates.)

All 68,230 councillors in 8,116 municipal councils (Note: Including 50 seats in the assemblies of Ceuta and Melilla.) All 1,422 provincial/island seats in 44 provinces (Note: Including: 1,040 seats in 38 provincial deputations; 157 seats in 7 Canarian island cabildos; 153 seats in 3 Basque foral deputations; 72 seats in 4 Balearic island councils.)
- Opinion polls
- Registered: 34,713,813 ▼1.3%
- Turnout: 22,968,281 (66.2%) ▲2.2 pp
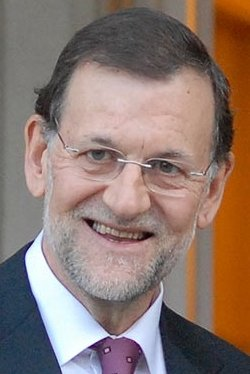

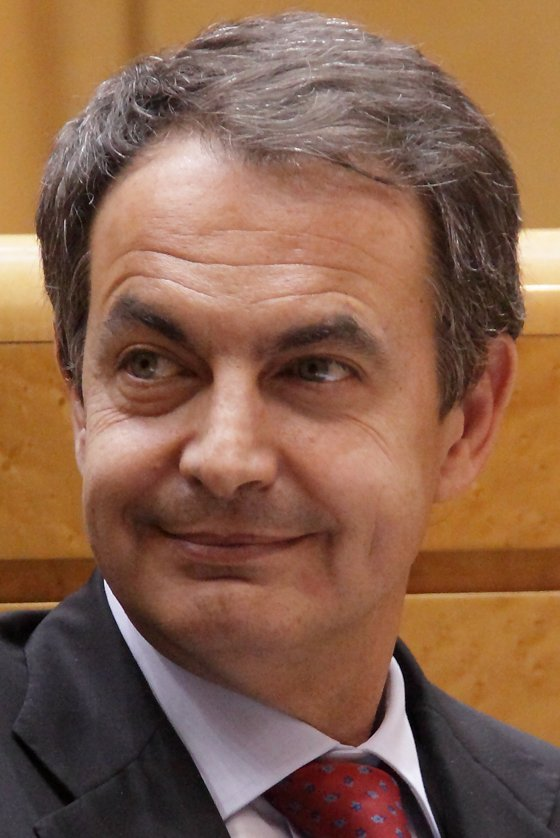

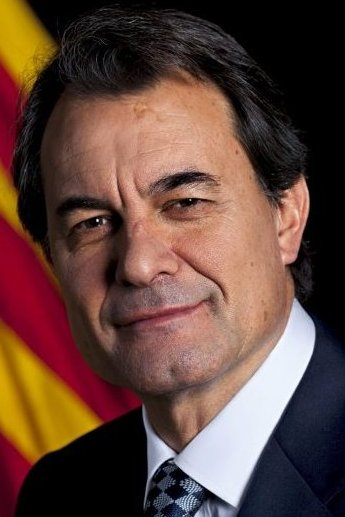

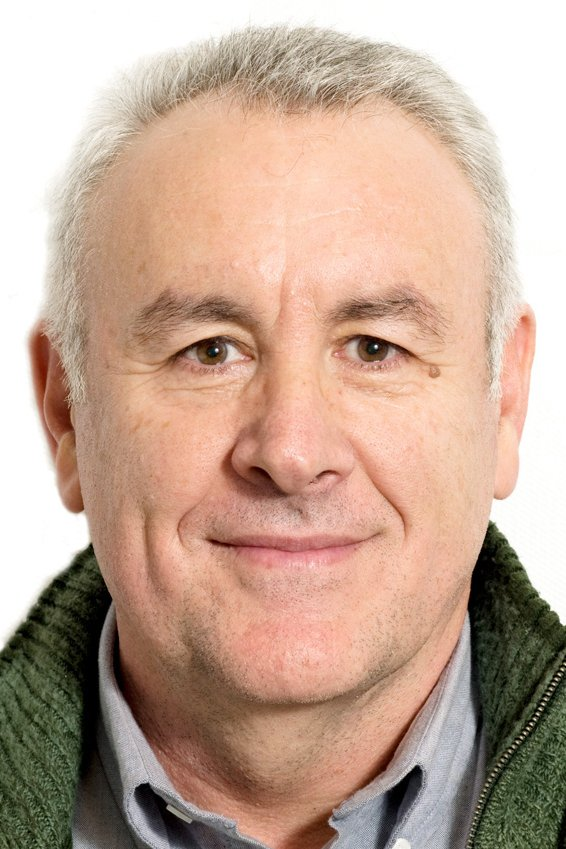

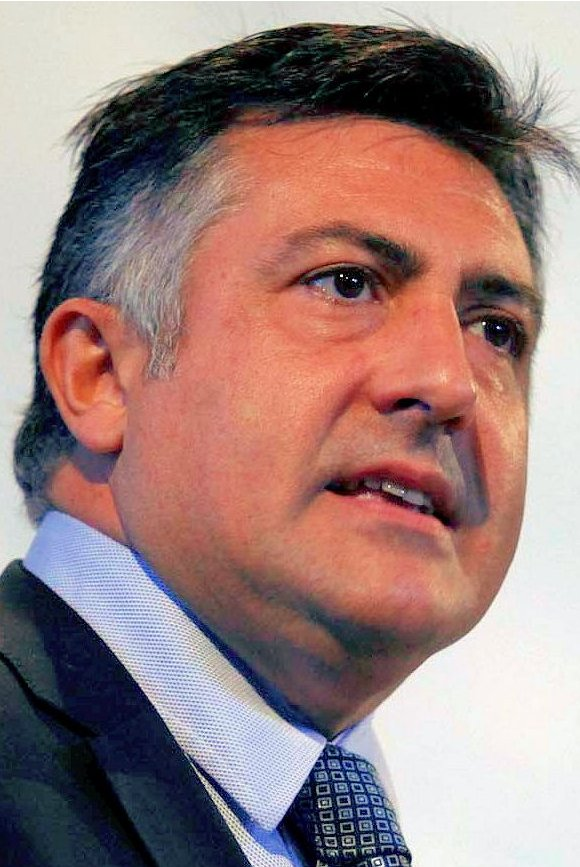

	First party	Second party	Third party
Leader	Mariano Rajoy	José Luis Rodríguez Zapatero	Artur Mas
Party	PP	PSOE	CiU
Leader since	2 October 2004	22 July 2000	27 November 2004
Last election	23,008 c., 35.1% (Note: Results for PP in the 2007 elections, not including Formentera.); 526 p.	24,029 c., 34.9% 590 p.	3,387 c., 3.3% 51 p.
Seats won	26,507 c. 618 p.	21,766 c. 487 p.	3,867 c. 63 p.
Seat change	▲3,499 c. ▲92 p.	▼2,263 c. ▼103 p.	▲480 c. ▲12 p.
Popular vote	8,476,138	6,275,314	779,188
Percentage	37.5%	27.8%	3.5%
Swing	▲2.4 pp	▼7.1 pp	▲0.2 pp
	Fourth party	Fifth party	Sixth party
Leader	Cayo Lara	Joan Puigcercós	Collective leadership
Party	IU	ERC–AM	Bildu–EA–Alternatiba
Leader since	14 December 2008	7 June 2008	3 April 2011
Last election	2,562 c., 7.0% (Note: Results for IU (6.6%, 2,450 c. and 29 p.) and totals within the EB–B–Aralar (0.4%, 112 c. and 8 p.) and Bloc (1 p.) alliances in the 2007 elections.); 38 p.	1,591 c., 1.6% 13 p.	687 c., 0.8% (Note: Results for ANV (0.4%, 432 c. and 5 p.) and EA (0.3%, 255 c. and 10 p.) in the 2007 elections.); 15 p.
Seats won	2,649 c. 29 p.	1,392 c. 11 p.	1,139 c. 45 p.
Seat change	▲87 c. ▼9 p.	▼199 c. ▼2 p.	▲452 c. ▲30 p.
Popular vote	1,679,082	271,503	313,238
Percentage	7.4%	1.2%	1.4%
Swing	▲0.4 pp	▼0.4 pp	▲0.6 pp
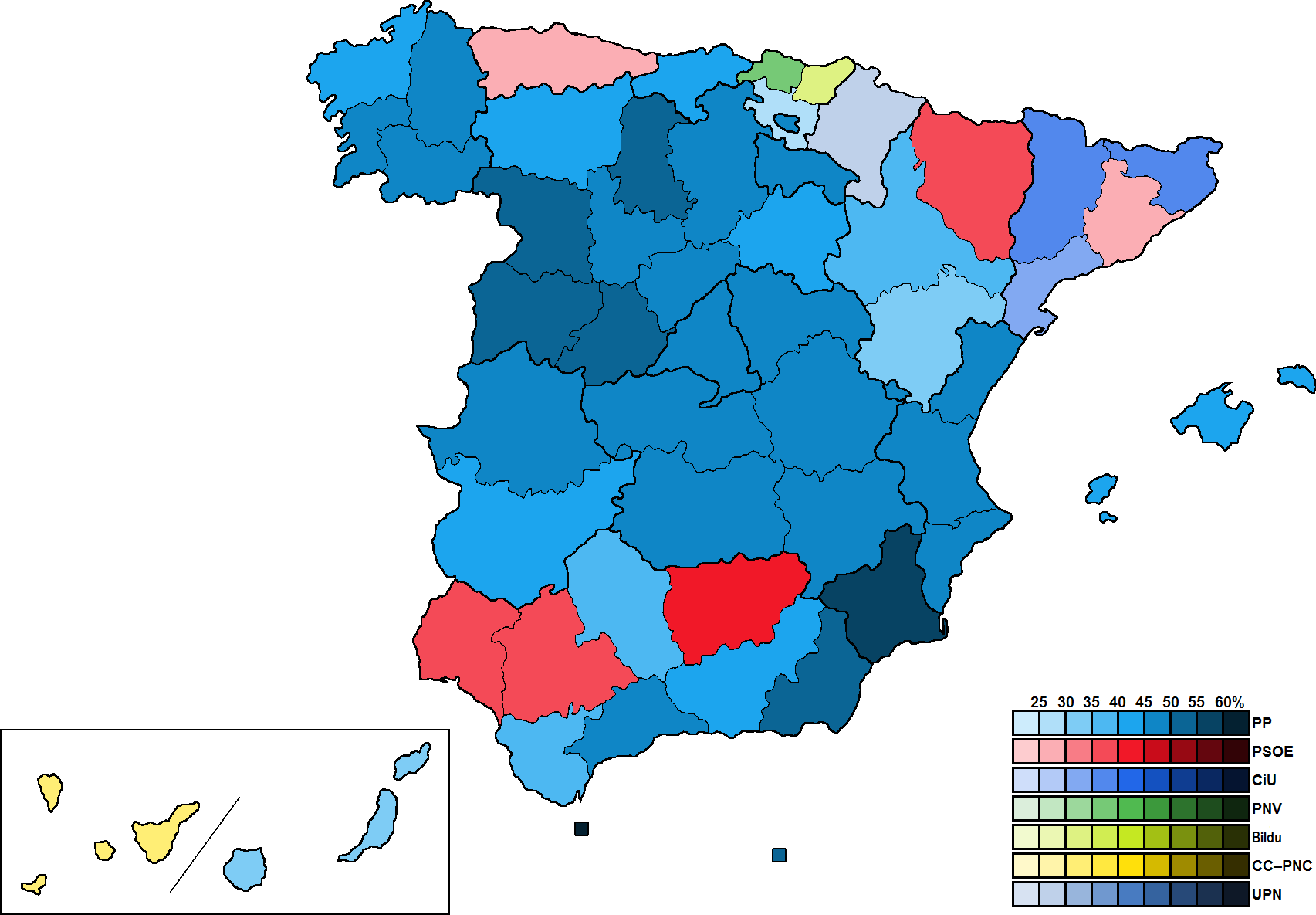
- Provincial results map for municipal elections

Local elections were held in Spain on 22 May 2011 to elect all 68,230 councillors in the 8,116 Spanish municipalities (including 50 seats in the assemblies of the autonomous cities of Ceuta and Melilla), all 1,193 provincial seats in 41 provinces (including 38 indirectly-elected provincial deputations and the three foral deputations in the Basque Country) and 229 seats in ten island councils (seven Canarian and four Balearic ones). They were held concurrently with regional elections in thirteen autonomous communities.

The days before the elections were marked by the 2011 Spanish protests which had been held in different cities across Spain since 15 May. The elections resulted in a landslide victory for the opposition People's Party (PP) and other centre-right parties, which won control of all of Spain's largest cities. In Barcelona, held by PSOE-sister party, the Socialists' Party of Catalonia (PSC), since the first local elections in 1979, was won for the first time by the nationalist Convergence and Union (CiU), which also won in Girona. The PSOE only won only in 5 out of Spain's 50 provincial capitals. In the popular vote, it scored its worst result in nationwide-held local elections, with a mere 27.8%, 10 points behind the PP, which obtained 37.5%.

Following the election, the PSOE named Deputy Prime Minister Alfredo Pérez Rubalcaba as prime ministerial candidate for the next general election, initially scheduled for March 2012, and finally held in November 2011.

== Overview ==
=== Local government ===
Under the 1978 Constitution, the governance of municipalities in Spain was centered on the figure of city councils (Spanish: ayuntamientos), local corporations with independent legal personality composed of a mayor, a government council and an elected legislative assembly. The mayor was indirectly elected by the local assembly, requiring an absolute majority; otherwise, the candidate from the most-voted party automatically became mayor (ties were resolved by drawing lots). The concejo abierto system (English: open council), under which voters directly elected the local mayor by plurality voting, was reserved for some minor local entities.

Provincial deputations were the governing bodies of provinces in Spain—except for single-province autonomous communities—having an administration role of municipal activities and composed of a provincial president, an administrative body, and a plenary. For insular provinces, such as the Balearic and Canary Islands, deputations were replaced by island councils in each of the islands or group of islands. For Gran Canaria, Tenerife, Fuerteventura, La Gomera, El Hierro, Lanzarote and La Palma, this figure was referred to in Spanish as cabildo insular, whereas for Mallorca, Menorca, Ibiza and Formentera, its name was consejo insular (Catalan: consell insular). The three Basque provinces had foral deputations instead (called General Assemblies, or Juntas Generales).

=== Date ===
The term of local assemblies in Spain expired four years after the date of their previous election, with election day being fixed for the fourth Sunday of May every four years. The election decree was required to be issued no later than 54 days before the scheduled election date and published on the following day in the Official State Gazette (BOE). The previous local elections were held on 27 May 2007, setting the date for election day on the fourth Sunday of May four years later, which was 22 May 2011.

Local assemblies could not be dissolved before the expiration of their term, except in cases of mismanagement that seriously harmed the public interest and implied a breach of constitutional obligations, in which case the Council of Ministers could—optionally—decide to call a by-election.

Elections to the assemblies of local entities were officially called on 29 March 2011 with the publication of the corresponding decree in the BOE, setting election day for 22 May. Subsequent by-elections were called on 27 September, for 20 November.

=== Electoral system ===
Voting for local assemblies and island councils was based on universal suffrage, comprising all Spanish nationals over 18 years of age, registered and residing in the municipality or council and with full political rights (provided that they had not been deprived of the right to vote by a final sentence, nor were legally incapacitated), as well as resident non-national European citizens, and those whose country of origin allowed reciprocal voting by virtue of a treaty.

Local councillors were elected using the D'Hondt method and closed-list proportional voting, with a five percent-threshold of valid votes (including blank ballots) in each constituency. Each municipality or council was a multi-member constituency, with a number of seats based on the following scale:

Population	Councillors		
Population	Municipalities	Canary Islands	Balearic Islands (Note: For the Island Council of Formentera, councillors in the city council served as island councillors.)
<100	3	No island below 5,000 inhabitants	Fixed number: Ibiza: 13; Menorca: 13; Mallorca: 33; Formentera: Same as homonymous city council
101–250	5	No island below 5,000 inhabitants	Fixed number: Ibiza: 13; Menorca: 13; Mallorca: 33; Formentera: Same as homonymous city council
251–1,000	7	No island below 5,000 inhabitants	Fixed number: Ibiza: 13; Menorca: 13; Mallorca: 33; Formentera: Same as homonymous city council
1,001–2,000	9	No island below 5,000 inhabitants	Fixed number: Ibiza: 13; Menorca: 13; Mallorca: 33; Formentera: Same as homonymous city council
2,001–5,000	11	No island below 5,000 inhabitants	Fixed number: Ibiza: 13; Menorca: 13; Mallorca: 33; Formentera: Same as homonymous city council
5,001–10,000	13	11	Fixed number: Ibiza: 13; Menorca: 13; Mallorca: 33; Formentera: Same as homonymous city council
10,001–20,000	17	13	Fixed number: Ibiza: 13; Menorca: 13; Mallorca: 33; Formentera: Same as homonymous city council
20,001–50,000	21	17	Fixed number: Ibiza: 13; Menorca: 13; Mallorca: 33; Formentera: Same as homonymous city council
50,001–100,000	25	21	Fixed number: Ibiza: 13; Menorca: 13; Mallorca: 33; Formentera: Same as homonymous city council
>100,001	+1 per each 100,000 inhabitants or fraction +1 if total is an even number		Fixed number: Ibiza: 13; Menorca: 13; Mallorca: 33; Formentera: Same as homonymous city council

Councillors in municipalities below 250 inhabitants were elected using open-list partial block voting, with voters in constituencies between 101 and 250 inhabitants choosing up to four candidates; and in those below 100, up to two.

Most provincial deputations were indirectly elected by applying the D'Hondt method and a three percent-threshold of valid votes to municipal results—excluding candidacies not electing any councillor—in each judicial district. Seats were allocated to provincial deputations based on the following scale (with each judicial district being assigned an initial minimum of one seat and a maximum of three-fifths of the total number of provincial seats, with the remaining ones distributed in proportion to population):

Population	Seats
<500,000	25
500,001–1,000,000	27
1,000,001–3,500,000	31
>3,500,001	51

The General Assemblies of Álava, Biscay and Gipuzkoa were directly elected by voters under their own, specific electoral regulations.

The law did not provide for by-elections to fill vacant seats; instead, any vacancies arising after the proclamation of candidates and during the legislative term were filled by the next candidates on the party lists or, when required, by designated substitutes.

== Parties and candidates ==
The electoral law allowed for parties and federations registered in the interior ministry, alliances and groupings of electors to present lists of candidates. Parties and federations intending to form an alliance were required to inform the relevant electoral commission within 10 days of the election call, whereas groupings of electors needed to secure the signature of a determined amount of the electors registered in the municipality for which they sought election, disallowing electors from signing for more than one list:

- At least one percent of the electors in municipalities with a population below 5,000 inhabitants, provided that the number of signers was more than double that of councillors at stake.
- At least 100 signatures in municipalities with a population between 5,001 and 10,000.
- At least 500 signatures in municipalities with a population between 10,001 and 50,000.
- At least 1,500 signatures in municipalities with a population between 50,001 and 150,000.
- At least 3,000 signatures in municipalities with a population between 150,001 and 300,000.
- At least 5,000 signatures in municipalities with a population between 300,001 and 1,000,000.
- At least 8,000 signatures in municipalities with a population over 1,000,001.

Additionally, a balanced composition of men and women was required in the electoral lists, so that candidates of either sex made up at least 40 percent of the total composition.

== Results ==
=== Municipal ===
==== Overall ====
← Summary of the 22 May 2011 Spanish municipal election results →
Parties and alliances	Popular vote			Councillors	
Parties and alliances	Votes	%	±pp	Total	+/−
People's Party (PP)^{1}	8,476,138	37.54	+2.43	**26,507**	+3,499
Spanish Socialist Workers' Party (PSOE)	6,275,314	27.79	−7.13	**21,766**	−2,263
United Left (IU)	1,679,082	7.44	+0.47	**2,649**	+87
United Left (IU)^{2}	1,437,061	6.36	+0.56	2,249	+143
Initiative for Catalonia Greens–EUiA–Agreement (ICV–EUiA–E)	242,021	1.07	−0.10	400	−56
Convergence and Union (CiU)	779,188	3.45	+0.20	**3,867**	+480
Union, Progress and Democracy (UPyD)	464,824	2.06	New	**152**	+152
Basque Nationalist Party (EAJ/PNV)	327,184	1.45	+0.06	**882**	−161
Unite–Basque Solidarity–Alternative (Bildu–EA–Alternatiba)^{3}	313,238	1.39	+0.64	**1,139**	+452
Republican Left of Catalonia–Municipal Agreement (ERC–AM)	271,503	1.20	−0.36	**1,392**	−199
Galician Nationalist Bloc (BNG)	261,466	1.16	−0.26	**589**	−72
Andalusian Party–Socialist Party–Andalusian Plural Space (PA–PSA–EPAnd)^{4}	232,375	1.03	−0.26	**476**	−115
Canarian Coalition–Nationalist Party–Canarian Centre (CC–PNC–CCN)	214,185	0.95	−0.21	**409**	−42
Canarian Coalition–Nationalist Party–Canarian Centre (CC–PNC–CCN)^{5}	211,988	0.94	−0.21	397	−43
Independent Herrenian Group (AHI)	2,197	0.01	±0.00	12	+1
Bloc–Initiative–Greens: Commitment Municipal Coalition (Compromís)^{6}	201,006	0.89	+0.41	**381**	+104
Forum of Citizens (FAC)	121,713	0.54	New	**158**	+158
Ecolo–Greens (Ecolo)	115,817	0.51	+0.18	**45**	+21
Ecolo–Greens (Ecolo)^{7}	94,015	0.42	+0.09	43	+19
Greens and Eco-pacifists (VyE)	11,425	0.05	New	1	+1
The Greens–European Green Group (EV–GVE)	10,377	0.05	New	1	+1
Navarrese People's Union (UPN)	88,156	0.39	−0.11	**323**	−13
Aragonese Party (PAR)	77,593	0.34	−0.08	**991**	+8
Regionalist Party of Cantabria (PRC)	70,634	0.31	−0.02	**319**	+16
Platform for Catalonia (PxC)	66,007	0.29	+0.23	**67**	+50
Popular Unity Candidacy (CUP)	62,409	0.28	+0.18	**101**	+77
New Canaries (NC)	56,947	0.25	−0.01	**62**	+1
Aragonese Union (CHA)	53,149	0.24	−0.02	**185**	−43
Citizens–Party of the Citizenry (C's)	43,245	0.19	−0.13	**12**	−1
Citizens for Blank Votes (CenB)	37,648	0.17	New	**4**	+4
Navarre Yes 2011 (NaBai 2011)	36,262	0.16	−0.08	**70**	−63
Aralar (Aralar)	32,660	0.14	+0.11	**42**	+9
Catalan Solidarity for Independence (SI)	31,793	0.14	New	**47**	+48
Castilian Party–Independent Candidacy (PCAS–CI)^{8}	31,572	0.14	−0.01	**195**	−47
PSM–Initiative Greens–Agreement (PSM–IV–ExM)^{9}	31,495	0.14	n/a	**74**	+16
Liberal Democratic Centre (CDL)	27,220	0.12	+0.06	**52**	+14
Anti-Bullfighting Party Against Mistreatment of Animals (PACMA)	27,203	0.12	+0.07	0	±0
Cordobese Union (UCOR)	24,805	0.11	New	**5**	+5
For a Fairer World (PUM+J)	21,631	0.10	New	0	±0
Leonese People's Union (UPL)	19,748	0.09	−0.06	**134**	−54
Yes We Can Citizens' Alternative (ACSSP)^{10}	17,897	0.08	+0.05	**20**	+15
Convergence for the Isles (CxI)^{11}	15,194	0.07	−0.09	**58**	−41
Galician Land (TeGa)	13,986	0.06	−0.09	**23**	−43
Vallès Alternative Candidacies (CAV)	13,781	0.06	±0.00	**16**	+3
Citizen Forum of Jerez (FCJ)	13,763	0.06	New	**4**	+4
Commitment to Gran Canaria (CGCa)	13,557	0.06	+0.01	**4**	+2
Union for Leganés (ULEG)	13,424	0.06	+0.04	**4**	+3
Spain 2000 (E–2000)	12,851	0.06	+0.04	**5**	+3
Federation of Independents of Catalonia (FIC)	12,607	0.06	−0.02	**86**	±0
Communist Party of the Peoples of Spain (PCPE)	11,568	0.05	+0.01	**1**	+1
Valencian Coalition (CVa)	10,737	0.05	−0.05	**10**	−10
Zamoran Independent Electors–Zamoran People's Union (ADEIZA–UPZ)	6,233	0.03	±0.00	**86**	+23
Lanzarote Independents Party (PIL)	4,997	0.02	−0.02	**16**	−6
Majorero Progressive Party (PPMAJO)	4,545	0.02	New	**17**	+17
Socialist Party of Menorca–Nationalist Agreement (PSM–EN)	3,420	0.02	+0.01	**7**	+2
Municipal Assemblies of Fuerteventura (AMF)	2,497	0.01	New	**6**	+6
Sorian People's Platform (PPSO)	2,144	0.01	New	**20**	+20
25 May Citizens' Alternative (AC25M)	1,690	0.01	±0.00	**2**	±0
People for Formentera (GxF)	1,662	0.01	±0.00	**6**	+1
The Union of Formentera (Sa Unió)^{12}	1,308	0.01	±0.00	**5**	−1
Others (lists at <0.05% not securing any provincial or island seat)	1,246,037	5.52	—	**4,739**	−28
Blank ballots	584,012	2.59	+0.67		
**Total**	**22,581,120**	**100.00**		**68,230**	**+2,099**
Valid votes	22,581,120	98.31	−0.52		
Invalid votes	387,161	1.69	+0.52		
**Votes cast / turnout**	**22,968,281**	**66.16**	**+2.19**		
Abstentions	11,745,532	33.84	−2.19		
**Registered voters**	**34,713,813**				
Sources
Footnotes: ^{1} People's Party does not include results in Formentera.; ^{2} Including results within the United Left–Greens–Aralar alliance in the 2007 elections.; ^{3} Unite–Basque Solidarity–Alternative results are compared to the combined totals of Basque Nationalist Action and Basque Solidarity in the 2007 elections.; ^{4} Andalusian Party–Socialist Party of Andalusia–Andalusian Plural Space results are compared to the combined totals of Andalusian Party and Socialist Party of Andalusia in the 2007 elections.; ^{5} Canarian Coalition–Nationalist Party–Canarian Centre results are compared to the combined totals of Canarian Coalition–Canarian Nationalist Party and Canarian Centre in the 2007 elections.; ^{6} Bloc–Initiative–Greens: Commitment Municipal Coalition results are compared to Valencian Nationalist Bloc–The Greens Ecologist Left totals in the 2007 elections.; ^{7} Ecolo–Greens results are compared to The Greens totals in the 2007 elections.; ^{8} Castilian Party–Independent Candidacy results are compared to the combined totals of Independent Candidacy–The Party of Castile and León and Commoners' Land in the 2007 elections.; ^{9} Within the Bloc for Mallorca alliance in the 2007 elections.; ^{10} Yes We Can Citizens' Alternative results are compared to Yes We Can Alternative for Tenerife totals in the 2007 elections.; ^{11} Convergence for the Isles results are compared to Majorcan Union totals in the 2007 elections.; ^{12} The Union of Formentera results are compared to the combined totals of People's Party (in Formentera) and Independents of Formentera Group in the 2007 elections.

Popular vote
PP	37.54%
PSOE	27.79%
IU	7.45%
CiU	3.45%
UPyD	2.06%
EAJ/PNV	1.45%
Bildu–EA–A	1.39%
ERC–AM	1.20%
BNG	1.16%
PA–PSA–EPAnd	1.03%
CC–PNC–CCN	0.95%
Compromís	0.89%
FAC	0.54%
Ecolo	0.51%
Others	10.03%
Blank ballots	2.59%

==== City control ====
The following table lists party control in provincial capitals (highlighted in bold), as well as in municipalities above 75,000. Gains for a party are highlighted in that party's colour.

Municipality	Population	Previous control	New control
**A Coruña**	246,047	Spanish Socialist Workers' Party (PSOE)	People's Party (PP)
**Albacete**	170,475	Spanish Socialist Workers' Party (PSOE)	People's Party (PP)
Alcalá de Henares	204,120	People's Party (PP)	People's Party (PP)
Alcobendas	110,080	People's Party (PP)	People's Party (PP)
Alcorcón	168,299	Spanish Socialist Workers' Party (PSOE)	People's Party (PP)
Algeciras	116,417	Spanish Socialist Workers' Party (PSOE)	People's Party (PP)
**Alicante**	334,418	People's Party (PP)	People's Party (PP)
**Almería**	190,013	People's Party (PP)	People's Party (PP)
Arona	79,377	Canarian Coalition (CC)	Canarian Coalition (CC)
**Ávila**	58,245	People's Party (PP)	People's Party (PP)
Avilés	84,202	Spanish Socialist Workers' Party (PSOE)	Spanish Socialist Workers' Party (PSOE)
**Badajoz**	150,376	People's Party (PP)	People's Party (PP)
Badalona	218,886	Socialists' Party of Catalonia (PSC–PSOE)	People's Party (PP)
Barakaldo	99,321	Spanish Socialist Workers' Party (PSOE)	Spanish Socialist Workers' Party (PSOE)
**Barcelona**	1,619,337	Socialists' Party of Catalonia (PSC–PSOE)	Convergence and Union (CiU)
**Bilbao**	353,187	Basque Nationalist Party (EAJ/PNV)	Basque Nationalist Party (EAJ/PNV)
**Burgos**	178,574	People's Party (PP)	People's Party (PP)
**Cáceres**	94,179	Spanish Socialist Workers' Party (PSOE)	People's Party (PP)
**Cádiz**	125,826	People's Party (PP)	People's Party (PP)
Cartagena	214,165	People's Party (PP)	People's Party (PP)
**Castellón de la Plana**	180,690	People's Party (PP)	People's Party (PP)
Chiclana de la Frontera	78,591	Spanish Socialist Workers' Party (PSOE)	People's Party (PP)
**Ciudad Real**	74,345	People's Party (PP)	People's Party (PP)
**Córdoba**	328,547	United Left (IU)	People's Party (PP)
Cornellà de Llobregat	87,240	Socialists' Party of Catalonia (PSC–PSOE)	Socialists' Party of Catalonia (PSC–PSOE)
Coslada	91,218	Spanish Socialist Workers' Party (PSOE)	People's Party (PP)
**Cuenca**	56,189	People's Party (PP)	Spanish Socialist Workers' Party (PSOE)
**Donostia-San Sebastián**	185,506	Spanish Socialist Workers' Party (PSOE)	Unite (Bildu)
Dos Hermanas	125,086	Spanish Socialist Workers' Party (PSOE)	Spanish Socialist Workers' Party (PSOE)
El Ejido	85,389	Party of Almería (PdeAL)	People's Party (PP)
El Puerto de Santa María	88,503	People's Party (PP)	People's Party (PP)
Elche	230,822	Spanish Socialist Workers' Party (PSOE)	People's Party (PP)
Ferrol	73,638 (Note: Reached 75,000 in 1970–2007.)	Spanish Socialist Workers' Party (PSOE)	People's Party (PP)
Fuenlabrada	198,973	Spanish Socialist Workers' Party (PSOE)	Spanish Socialist Workers' Party (PSOE)
Gandía	79,430	Spanish Socialist Workers' Party (PSOE)	People's Party (PP)
Getafe	169,130	Spanish Socialist Workers' Party (PSOE)	People's Party (PP)
Getxo	80,277	Basque Nationalist Party (EAJ/PNV)	Basque Nationalist Party (EAJ/PNV)
Gijón	277,198	Spanish Socialist Workers' Party (PSOE)	Forum of Citizens (FAC)
**Girona**	96,236	Socialists' Party of Catalonia (PSC–PSOE)	Convergence and Union (CiU)
**Granada**	239,154	People's Party (PP)	People's Party (PP)
**Guadalajara**	83,789	People's Party (PP)	People's Party (PP)
**Huelva**	149,310	People's Party (PP)	People's Party (PP)
**Huesca**	52,347	Spanish Socialist Workers' Party (PSOE)	People's Party (PP)
**Jaén**	116,790	Spanish Socialist Workers' Party (PSOE)	People's Party (PP)
Jerez de la Frontera	208,896	Spanish Socialist Workers' Party (PSOE)	People's Party (PP)
L'Hospitalet de Llobregat	258,642	Socialists' Party of Catalonia (PSC–PSOE)	Socialists' Party of Catalonia (PSC–PSOE)
**Las Palmas de Gran Canaria**	383,308	Spanish Socialist Workers' Party (PSOE)	People's Party (PP)
Las Rozas de Madrid	88,065	People's Party (PP)	People's Party (PP)
Leganés	187,227	Spanish Socialist Workers' Party (PSOE)	People's Party (PP)
**León**	134,012	Spanish Socialist Workers' Party (PSOE)	People's Party (PP)
**Lleida**	137,387	Socialists' Party of Catalonia (PSC–PSOE)	Socialists' Party of Catalonia (PSC–PSOE)
**Logroño**	152,650	Spanish Socialist Workers' Party (PSOE)	People's Party (PP)
**Lorca**	92,694	People's Party (PP)	People's Party (PP)
**Lugo**	97,635	Spanish Socialist Workers' Party (PSOE)	Spanish Socialist Workers' Party (PSOE)
**Madrid**	3,273,049	People's Party (PP)	People's Party (PP)
**Málaga**	568,507	People's Party (PP)	People's Party (PP)
Manresa	76,209	Socialists' Party of Catalonia (PSC–PSOE)	Convergence and Union (CiU)
Marbella	136,322	People's Party (PP)	People's Party (PP)
Mataró	122,905	Socialists' Party of Catalonia (PSC–PSOE)	Convergence and Union (CiU)
Mijas	76,362	Spanish Socialist Workers' Party (PSOE)	People's Party (PP)
Móstoles	206,015	People's Party (PP)	People's Party (PP)
**Murcia**	441,345	People's Party (PP)	People's Party (PP)
Orihuela	87,113	People's Party (PP)	The Greens (LV)
**Ourense**	108,673	Spanish Socialist Workers' Party (PSOE)	Spanish Socialist Workers' Party (PSOE)
**Oviedo**	225,155	People's Party (PP)	People's Party (PP)
**Palencia**	82,169	Spanish Socialist Workers' Party (PSOE)	People's Party (PP)
**Palma** (Note: Renamed from Palma de Mallorca in June 2008.)	404,681	Spanish Socialist Workers' Party (PSOE)	People's Party (PP)
**Pamplona**	197,488	Navarrese People's Union (UPN)	Navarrese People's Union (UPN)
Parla	120,182	Spanish Socialist Workers' Party (PSOE)	Spanish Socialist Workers' Party (PSOE)
**Pontevedra**	81,981	Galician Nationalist Bloc (BNG)	Galician Nationalist Bloc (BNG)
Pozuelo de Alarcón	82,804	People's Party (PP)	People's Party (PP)
Reus	106,622	Socialists' Party of Catalonia (PSC–PSOE)	Convergence and Union (CiU)
Roquetas de Mar	85,808	People's Party (PP)	People's Party (PP)
Sabadell	207,338	Socialists' Party of Catalonia (PSC–PSOE)	Socialists' Party of Catalonia (PSC–PSOE)
**Salamanca**	154,462	People's Party (PP)	People's Party (PP)
San Cristóbal de La Laguna	152,222	Canarian Coalition (CC)	Canarian Coalition (CC)
San Fernando	96,689	Andalusian Party (PA)	People's Party (PP)
San Sebastián de los Reyes	78,157	People's Party (PP)	People's Party (PP)
Sant Boi de Llobregat	82,411	Socialists' Party of Catalonia (PSC–PSOE)	Socialists' Party of Catalonia (PSC–PSOE)
Sant Cugat del Vallès	81,745	Convergence and Union (CiU)	Convergence and Union (CiU)
Santa Coloma de Gramenet	119,056	Socialists' Party of Catalonia (PSC–PSOE)	Socialists' Party of Catalonia (PSC–PSOE)
**Santa Cruz de Tenerife**	222,643	Canarian Coalition (CC)	Canarian Coalition (CC)
**Santander**	181,589	People's Party (PP)	People's Party (PP)
Santiago de Compostela	94,824	Spanish Socialist Workers' Party (PSOE)	People's Party (PP)
**Segovia**	55,748	Spanish Socialist Workers' Party (PSOE)	Spanish Socialist Workers' Party (PSOE)
**Seville**	704,198	Spanish Socialist Workers' Party (PSOE)	People's Party (PP)
**Soria**	39,838	Spanish Socialist Workers' Party (PSOE)	Spanish Socialist Workers' Party (PSOE)
Talavera de la Reina	88,986	Spanish Socialist Workers' Party (PSOE)	People's Party (PP)
**Tarragona**	134,933	Socialists' Party of Catalonia (PSC–PSOE)	Socialists' Party of Catalonia (PSC–PSOE)
Telde	100,900	New Canaries (NC)	People's Party (PP)
Terrassa	212,724	Socialists' Party of Catalonia (PSC–PSOE)	Socialists' Party of Catalonia (PSC–PSOE)
**Teruel**	35,241	People's Party (PP)	People's Party (PP)
**Toledo**	82,489	Spanish Socialist Workers' Party (PSOE)	Spanish Socialist Workers' Party (PSOE)
Torrejón de Ardoz	118,441	People's Party (PP)	People's Party (PP)
Torrent	79,843	People's Party (PP)	People's Party (PP)
Torrevieja	101,091	People's Party (PP)	People's Party (PP)
**Valencia**	809,267	People's Party (PP)	People's Party (PP)
**Valladolid**	315,522	People's Party (PP)	People's Party (PP)
Vélez-Málaga	75,623	Spanish Socialist Workers' Party (PSOE)	People's Party (PP)
Vigo	297,124	Spanish Socialist Workers' Party (PSOE)	Spanish Socialist Workers' Party (PSOE)
**Vitoria-Gasteiz**	238,247	Spanish Socialist Workers' Party (PSOE)	People's Party (PP)
**Zamora**	65,998	People's Party (PP)	People's Party (PP)
**Zaragoza**	675,121	Spanish Socialist Workers' Party (PSOE)	Spanish Socialist Workers' Party (PSOE)

==== Autonomous cities ====
The following table lists party control in the autonomous cities. Gains for a party are highlighted in that party's colour.

City	Population	Previous control	New control
Ceuta	80,579	People's Party (PP)	People's Party (PP)
Melilla	76,034	People's Party (PP)	People's Party (PP)

=== Provincial and island ===
==== Summary ====
← Summary of the 22 May 2011 Spanish provincial and island election results →
Parties and alliances	Seats				
Parties and alliances	PD	IC	FD	Total	+/−
People's Party (PP)^{1}	508	82	28	**618**	+92
Spanish Socialist Workers' Party (PSOE)	395	64	28	**487**	−103
Convergence and Union (CiU)	63	—	—	**63**	+12
Canarian Coalition–Nationalist Party–Canarian Centre (CC–PNC–CCN)	—	53	—	**53**	−2
Canarian Coalition–Nationalist Party–Canarian Centre (CC–PNC–CCN)^{2}	—	47	—	47	±0
Independent Herrenian Group (AHI)	—	6	—	6	−1
Canarian Nationalist Party (PNC)	—	0	—	0	−1
Basque Nationalist Party (EAJ/PNV)	—	—	49	**49**	−4
Gather–Basque Solidarity–Alternative (Bildu–EA–Alternatiba)^{3}	—	—	45	**45**	+30
United Left (IU)	27	0	2	**29**	−9
United Left (IU)^{4}	23	0	2	25	−9
Initiative for Catalonia Greens–EUiA–Agreement (ICV–EUiA–E)	4	—	—	4	±0
Galician Nationalist Bloc (BNG)	13	—	—	**13**	−4
Republican Left of Catalonia–Municipal Agreement (ERC–AM)	11	—	—	**11**	−2
Aragonese Party (PAR)	10	—	—	**10**	−1
People for Formentera (GxF)	—	6	—	**6**	+1
New Canaries (NCa)	—	5	—	**5**	−1
The Union of Formentera (Sa Unió)^{5}	—	5	—	**5**	−1
PSM–Initiative Greens–Agreement–APIB (PSM–IV–ExM–APIB)^{6}	—	4	—	**4**	+2
Lanzarote Independents Party (PIL)	—	3	—	**3**	−3
Majorero Progressive Party (PPMAJO)	—	3	—	**3**	+3
Union, Progress and Democracy (UPyD)	2	0	0	**2**	+2
Andalusian Party–Socialist Party–Andalusian Plural Space (PA–PSA–EPAnd)	2	—	—	**2**	−2
Bloc–Initiative–Greens: Commitment Municipal Coalition (Compromís)^{7}	2	—	—	**2**	+1
Cordobese Union (UCOR)	2	—	—	**2**	+2
Municipal Assemblies of Fuerteventura (AMF)	—	2	—	**2**	+2
Aragonese Union (CHA)	1	—	—	**1**	−2
Aralar (Aralar)^{8}	—	—	1	**1**	−3
Leonese People's Union (UPL)	1	—	—	**1**	±0
Citizen Forum of Jerez (FCJ)	1	—	—	**1**	+1
Zamoran Independent Electors–Zamoran People's Union (ADEIZA–UPZ)	1	—	—	**1**	±0
Socialist Party of Menorca–Nationalist Agreement (PSM–EN)	—	1	—	**1**	±0
25 May Citizens' Alternative (AC25M)	—	1	—	**1**	+1
Sorian People's Platform (PPSO)	1	—	—	**1**	+1
Convergence for the Isles (CxI)^{9}	—	0	—	0	−3
Party of Almería (PdeAL)	0	—	—	0	−2
Initiative for the Development of Soria (IDES)	0	—	—	0	−1
Independent Solution (SI)	n/a	n/a	n/a	0	−1
**Total**	**1,040**	**229**	**153**	**1,422**	**+6**
Sources
Footnotes: ^{1} People's Party does not include results in Formentera.; ^{2} Canarian Coalition–Nationalist Party–Canarian Centre results are compared to the combined totals of Canarian Coalition–Canarian Nationalist Party and Canarian Centre in the 2007 elections.; ^{3} Gather–Basque Solidarity–Alternative results are compared to the combined totals of Basque Solidarity and Basque Nationalist Action in the 2007 elections.; ^{4} Including results within the United Left–Greens–Aralar and Bloc for Mallorca alliances in the 2007 elections.; ^{5} The Union of Formentera results are compared to the combined totals of People's Party (in Formentera) and Independents of Formentera Group in the 2007 elections.; ^{6} Within the Bloc for Mallorca alliance in the 2007 elections.; ^{7} Bloc–Initiative–Greens: Commitment Municipal Coalition results are compared to Valencian Nationalist Bloc–The Greens Ecologist Left totals in the 2007 elections.; ^{8} Within the United Left–Greens–Aralar alliance in the 2007 elections.; ^{9} Convergence for the Isles results are compared to Majorcan Union totals in the 2007 elections.

==== Indirectly-elected ====
The following table lists party control in the indirectly-elected provincial deputations. Gains for a party are highlighted in that party's colour.

Province	Population	Previous control	New control
A Coruña	1,146,458	Spanish Socialist Workers' Party (PSOE)	People's Party (PP)
Albacete	401,682	Spanish Socialist Workers' Party (PSOE)	People's Party (PP)
Alicante	1,926,285	People's Party (PP)	People's Party (PP)
Almería	695,560	Spanish Socialist Workers' Party (PSOE)	People's Party (PP)
Ávila	171,896	People's Party (PP)	People's Party (PP)
Badajoz	692,137	Spanish Socialist Workers' Party (PSOE)	Spanish Socialist Workers' Party (PSOE)
Barcelona	5,511,147	Socialists' Party of Catalonia (PSC–PSOE)	Convergence and Union (CiU)
Burgos	374,355	People's Party (PP)	People's Party (PP)
Cáceres	415,083	Spanish Socialist Workers' Party (PSOE)	People's Party (PP)
Cádiz	1,236,739	Spanish Socialist Workers' Party (PSOE)	People's Party (PP)
Castellón	604,274	People's Party (PP)	People's Party (PP)
Ciudad Real	529,453	Spanish Socialist Workers' Party (PSOE)	Spanish Socialist Workers' Party (PSOE)
Córdoba	805,108	Spanish Socialist Workers' Party (PSOE)	People's Party (PP)
Cuenca	217,716	Spanish Socialist Workers' Party (PSOE)	People's Party (PP)
Girona	753,046	Republican Left of Catalonia (ERC)	Convergence and Union (CiU)
Granada	918,072	Spanish Socialist Workers' Party (PSOE)	People's Party (PP)
Guadalajara	251,563	Spanish Socialist Workers' Party (PSOE)	People's Party (PP)
Huelva	518,081	Spanish Socialist Workers' Party (PSOE)	Spanish Socialist Workers' Party (PSOE)
Huesca	228,566	Spanish Socialist Workers' Party (PSOE)	Spanish Socialist Workers' Party (PSOE)
Jaén	670,761	Spanish Socialist Workers' Party (PSOE)	Spanish Socialist Workers' Party (PSOE)
León	499,284	People's Party (PP)	People's Party (PP)
Lleida	439,768	Republican Left of Catalonia (ERC)	Convergence and Union (CiU)
Lugo	353,504	Spanish Socialist Workers' Party (PSOE)	Spanish Socialist Workers' Party (PSOE)
Málaga	1,609,557	Spanish Socialist Workers' Party (PSOE)	People's Party (PP)
Ourense	335,219	People's Party (PP)	People's Party (PP)
Palencia	172,510	People's Party (PP)	People's Party (PP)
Pontevedra	962,472	People's Party (PP)	People's Party (PP)
Salamanca	353,619	People's Party (PP)	People's Party (PP)
Segovia	164,268	People's Party (PP)	People's Party (PP)
Seville	1,917,097	Spanish Socialist Workers' Party (PSOE)	Spanish Socialist Workers' Party (PSOE)
Soria	95,258	People's Party (PP)	People's Party (PP)
Tarragona	808,420	Convergence and Union (CiU)	Convergence and Union (CiU)
Teruel	145,277	Spanish Socialist Workers' Party (PSOE)	People's Party (PP)
Toledo	697,959	Spanish Socialist Workers' Party (PSOE)	People's Party (PP)
Valencia	2,581,147	People's Party (PP)	People's Party (PP)
Valladolid	533,640	People's Party (PP)	People's Party (PP)
Zamora	194,214	People's Party (PP)	People's Party (PP)
Zaragoza	973,252	Spanish Socialist Workers' Party (PSOE)	People's Party (PP)

==== Island councils ====
The following table lists party control in the island councils. Gains for a party are highlighted in that party's colour.

Island	Population	Previous control	New control
El Hierro	10,960	Independent Herrenian Group (AHI)	Independent Herrenian Group (AHI) (PSOE in 2011)
Formentera	9,962	People for Formentera (GxF)	People for Formentera (GxF)
Fuerteventura	103,492	Canarian Coalition–Canarian Nationalist Party (CC–PNC)	Canarian Coalition–Canarian Nationalist Party (CC–PNC)
Gran Canaria	845,676	Spanish Socialist Workers' Party (PSOE)	People's Party (PP)
Ibiza	132,637	Spanish Socialist Workers' Party (PSOE)	People's Party (PP)
La Gomera	22,776	Spanish Socialist Workers' Party (PSOE)	Spanish Socialist Workers' Party (PSOE) (ASG in 2015)
La Palma	87,324	Canarian Coalition–Canarian Nationalist Party (CC–PNC)	Canarian Coalition–Canarian Nationalist Party (CC–PNC) (PSOE in 2013)
Lanzarote	141,437	Canarian Coalition–Canarian Nationalist Party (CC–PNC)	Canarian Coalition–Canarian Nationalist Party (CC–PNC)
Mallorca	869,067	Spanish Socialist Workers' Party (PSOE)	People's Party (PP)
Menorca	94,383	Spanish Socialist Workers' Party (PSOE)	People's Party (PP)
Tenerife	906,854	Canarian Coalition–Canarian Nationalist Party (CC–PNC)	Canarian Coalition–Canarian Nationalist Party (CC–PNC)

==== Foral deputations ====
The following table lists party control in the foral deputations. Gains for a party are highlighted in that party's colour.

Province	Population	Previous control	New control
Álava	317,352	Basque Nationalist Party (EAJ/PNV)	People's Party (PP)
Biscay	1,153,724	Basque Nationalist Party (EAJ/PNV)	Basque Nationalist Party (EAJ/PNV)
Guipúzcoa	707,263	Basque Nationalist Party (EAJ/PNV)	Gather (Bildu)

== Bibliography ==
- Constitución Española (Constitution). Official State Gazette (in Spanish). 27 December 1978 [version as of 28 August 1992]. BOE-A-1978-31229.
- Ley Orgánica 10/1982, de 10 de agosto, de Estatuto de Autonomía de Canarias (Organic Law 10/1982). Official State Gazette (in Spanish). 10 August 1982 [version as of 17 July 2010]. BOE-A-1982-20821.
- Ley 27/1983, de 25 de noviembre, de Relaciones entre las Instituciones Comunes de la Comunidad Autónoma y los Órganos Forales de sus Territorios Históricos (Law 27/1983). Official State Gazette (in Spanish). 25 November 1983 [version as of 19 July 2006]. BOE-A-2012-5193.
- Ley 7/1985, de 2 de abril, Reguladora de las Bases del Régimen Local (Law 7/1985). Official State Gazette (in Spanish). 2 April 1985 [version as of 5 March 2011]. BOE-A-1985-5392.
- Ley Orgánica 5/1985, de 19 de junio, del Régimen Electoral General (Organic Law 5/1985). Official State Gazette (in Spanish). 19 June 1985 [version as of 30 April 2011]. BOE-A-1985-11672.
- Ley 8/1986, de 26 de noviembre, Electoral de la Comunidad Autónoma de las Islas Baleares (Law 8/1986). Official State Gazette (in Spanish). 26 November 1986 [version as of 3 November 2006]. BOE-A-1987-2903.
- Ley 1/1987, de 27 de marzo, de Elecciones para las Juntas Generales de los Territorios Históricos de Araba, Bizkaia y Gipuzkoa (Law 1/1987). Official State Gazette (in Spanish). 27 March 1987 [version as of 2 March 2005]. BOE-A-2012-3948.
- Ley 14/1990, de 26 de julio, de Régimen Jurídico de las Administraciones Públicas de Canarias (Law 14/1990). Official State Gazette (in Spanish). 26 July 1990 [version as of 14 December 2001]. BOE-A-1990-23140.
- Ley 8/2000, de 27 de octubre, de Consejos Insulares (Law 8/2000). Official State Gazette (in Spanish). 27 October 2000 [version as of 1 June 2001]. BOE-A-2000-20977.
- Ley Orgánica 1/2007, de 28 de febrero, de reforma del Estatuto de Autonomía de las Illes Balears (Organic Law 1/2007). Official State Gazette (in Spanish). 28 February 2007 [version as of 17 July 2010]. BOE-A-2007-4233.
- Ley 8/2008, de 5 de junio, de modificación de la Ley 23/2006, de 20 de diciembre, de capitalidad de Palma de Mallorca (Law 8/2008). Official State Gazette (in Spanish). 5 June 2008. BOE-A-2008-12052.
- Ley 7/2009, de 11 de diciembre, electoral de los Consejos Insulares (Law 7/2009). Official State Gazette (in Spanish). 11 December 2009 [version as of 22 December 2009]. BOE-A-2010-1399.
- Real Decreto 424/2011, de 28 de marzo, por el que se convocan elecciones locales y a las Asambleas de Ceuta y Melilla para el 22 de mayo de 2011 (Royal Decree 424/2011). Official State Gazette (in Spanish). 28 March 2011. BOE-A-2011-5608.
- Real Decreto 1309/2011, de 26 de septiembre, por el que se convocan elecciones locales parciales 2011 (Royal Decree 1309/2011). Official State Gazette (in Spanish). 28 March 2011. BOE-A-2011-15175.
