= Hamaikabat =

Former Basque political party

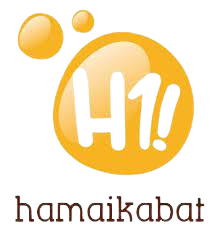
- Leader: Iñaki Galdos
- Founded: May 14, 2009
- Dissolved: July 30, 2011
- Ideology: Basque nationalism Social democracy Basque independence
- Political position: Centre-left

Hamaikabat (transl. Many with one Goal, H1!) was a Basque nationalist party that existed between 2009 and 2011.

== History ==
It was created by ex-members of Eusko Alkartasuna, being officially registered in May 2009. The main reason of the split was the rejection of the formation of a coalition with the Abertzale left by Eusko Alkartasuna.

H1! disappeared in 2011 after poor results in the local elections of that year.
