= EH Bildu =

Basque Country Gather Euskal Herria Bildu
- General Coordinator: Arnaldo Otegi
- Spokesperson in the Basque Parliament: Nerea Kortajarena
- Spokesperson in the Parliament of Navarre: Laura Aznal
- Spokesperson in the Congress of Deputies: Mertxe Aizpurua
- Founded: 3 April 2011 (Bildu); 10 June 2012 (EH Bildu)
- Headquarters: C/ Pilotegi, 2; 20018, Donostia-San Sebastián
- Ideology: Basque independence Left-wing nationalism Abertzale left Socialism
- Political position: Left-wing to far-left
- National affiliation: Amaiur (2011–2015); The Peoples Decide (2014–2019); Orain Errepublikak - Ahora Repúblicas (2019–present)
- European affiliation: ELA (associated member)
- European Parliament group: The Left in the European Parliament
- Colors: Turquoise (official); Lime (former)
- Congress of Deputies (Basque and Navarrese seats): 6 / 23
- Senate (Basque and Navarrese seats): 5 / 20
- European Parliament (Spanish seats): 1 / 61
- Basque Parliament: 27 / 75
- Parliament of Navarre: 9 / 50
- Juntas Generales: 51 / 153
- Mayors (2019–2023) (Note: Results in the Basque Autonomous Community, Navarre and the Enclave of Treviño.): 120 / 525
- Local government (2023–2027): 1,402 / 4,663

Website
- ehbildu.eus

EH Bildu, short for Euskal Herria Bildu (English: 'Basque Country Gather' or 'Basque Country Unite'), is a left-wing, Basque nationalist and pro-independence federation of political parties in Spain. It is the main political force of the abertzale left in Spain. EH Bildu is active in the Spanish Basque Country, that is, in the Basque Autonomous Community and Chartered Community of Navarre, as well as in the Treviño enclave of the Burgos Province. In the French Basque Country, it has an alliance with the party Euskal Herria Bai, with the goal of establishing a state for the Basque Country across the Spanish-French border.

== History ==
=== Formation of Bildu ===
Bildu was formed in response to the March 2011 ruling by Spain's Supreme Court that banned the registration of a new Basque party called Sortu. Bildu was a coalition of the social democratic Eusko Alkartasuna, Alternatiba (a splinter group from Ezker Batua) and independent individuals from the Basque left-wing nationalist milieu, originating from the banned Batasuna party, all of them formerly members of the Amaiur coalition.

Bildu was also banned by the Supreme Court for its links to Batasuna, the political wing of the banned armed separatist group ETA. The decision to ban Bildu sparked street protests in Bilbao and other cities. However, on 5 May 2011, exactly the day the election campaign began, Spain's Constitutional Court lifted the ban and Bildu was allowed to participate in the elections.

The public presentation of EH Bildu took place on 10 June 2012 in San Sebastián. Present at the event were, among others, the former members of Batasuna Rufi Etxeberria and Joseba Permach; the general secretary of EA, Pello Urizar; the coordinator of Aralar, Patxi Zabaleta; Alternatiba spokesperson, Oskar Matute; and the general deputy of Gipuzkoa for Bildu, Martín Garitano.

On 3 July 2012, Laura Mintegi was elected candidate for lehendakari in the 2012 Basque parliamentary elections. Mintegi, a professor at the University of the Basque Country, had already presented herself as a candidate for Herri Batasuna.

Although the newspaper Gara announced that Sortu would join the coalition after the Constitutional Court revoked its illegalization, which was confirmed by its spokesperson in a press conference on July 11, 2012, this incorporation was finally postponed due to the advance of the elections to the Basque Parliament, which made them coincide with the constitutive debate process of said party.

In the 2020 Basque regional election, three political prisoner members of political youth or illegalized media were elected: Arkaitz Rodríguez, Iker Casanova and Ikoitz Arrese.

=== 2011 elections ===
At the 2011 local elections, Bildu received 26% of the vote in the Basque region, coming second only to the Basque Nationalist Party (PNV).^{[10]} The party won seats in most of the councils of the Southern Basque Country, including San Sebastián (where it came first), Bilbao, Vitoria-Gasteiz and Pamplona.

For the 2011 general election, Eusko Alkartasuna, Alternatiba and their allies formed a new alliance, under the name Amaiur, along with Aralar, previously part of Nafarroa Bai, and other abertzale (i.e., Basque nationalist) groups.

=== 2012 Basque regional election ===
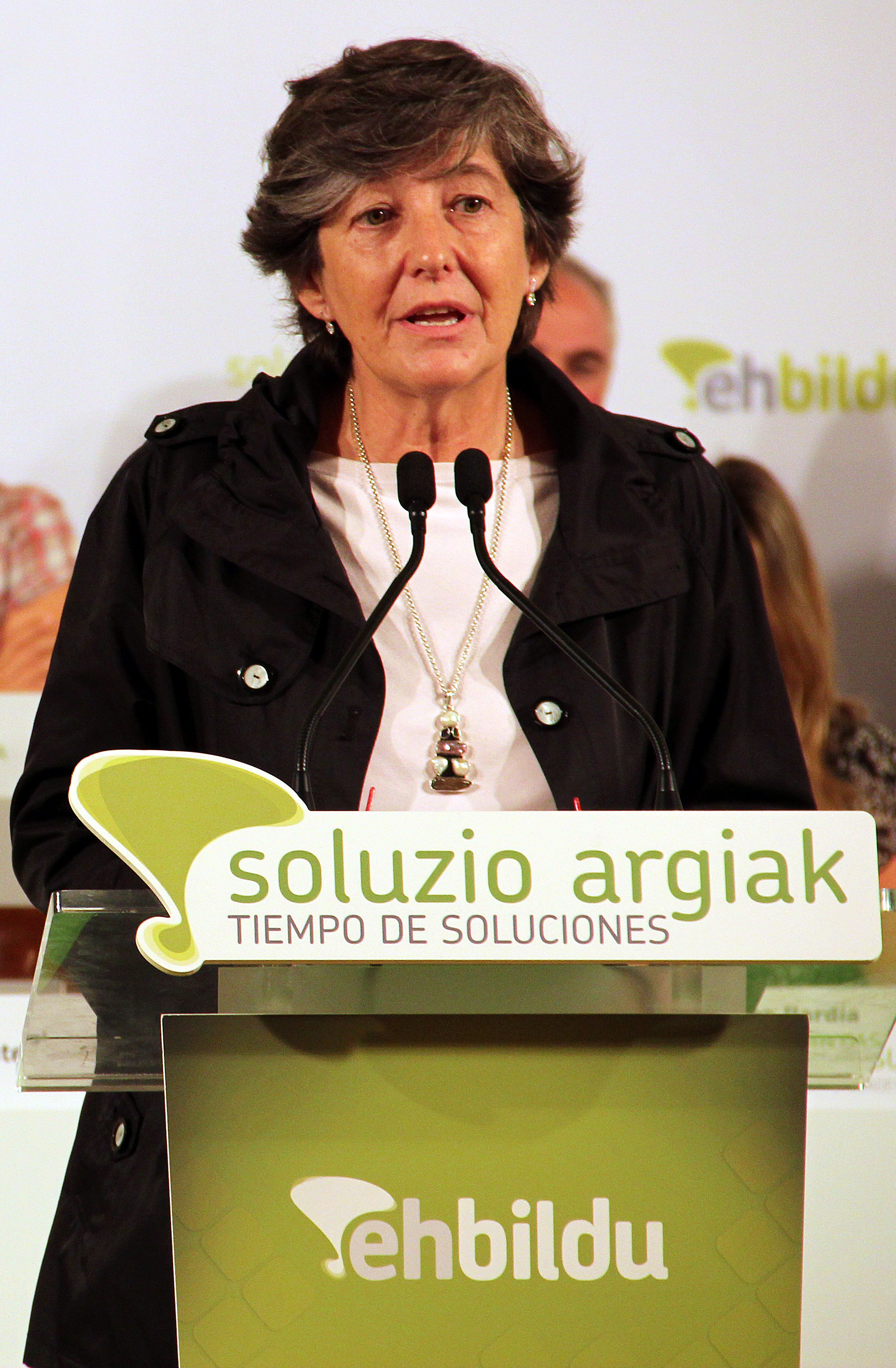
Laura Mintegi was the candidate chosen by EH Bildu in 2012 for the presidency of the Basque Government.

On 3 July 2012, the writer and university professor Laura Mintegi was presented as Bildu's candidate for the presidency of the Basque Government for the October 21 elections. Mintegi was already on the lists of Amaiur in the general elections of 2011 for the Senate for Biscay and on those of Herri Batasuna (HB) in the European elections of 1987 and 1989. The heads of the coalition list for Álava and Gipuzkoa were, respectively, the spokesperson for the STEE-EILAS union Belén Arrondo and the University of the Basque Country professor Xabier Isasi.

The list for Biscay, headed by Laura Mintegi, was completed by the former mayor of Amoroto and former spokesperson for Udalbiltza Maribi Ugarteburu, the Secretary of the Treasury of the National Executive of EA Leire Pinedo, the vice coordinator of Aralar Daniel Maeztu and the spokesperson for Alternatiba Oskar Matute. In eighth place was the lawyer and former parliamentarian of Herri Batasuna Jone Goirizelaia.

For Gipuzkoa, the list included the Basque teacher and technician Lur Etxeberria. Also on Álava's list were the member of the nationalist left Hasier Arraiz, the Bildu councilor in Amurrio Eva Blanco, the lawyer Julen Arzuaga and the Aralar deputy Igor López de Munain.

To prepare the electoral lists, the organizations that made up the coalition negotiated the percentage of representation that each one was going to have within it. In this way, it was agreed that the nationalist left would decide 60% of the names on the lists, EA 20%, Aralar 13% and Alternatiba 7%.

In the end, Bildu obtained 277,923 votes (25.0%) and 21 parliamentarians. Of them, five were members of EA (Pello Urizar, Juanjo Agirrezabala, Arritokieta Zulaika, Leire Pinedo and Eva Blanco), three of Aralar (Rebeka Ubera, Igor López de Muniain and Daniel Maeztu) and two of Alternatiba (Oskar Matute and Diana Urrea), because Arritokieta Zulaika from EA replaced Arturo Muñoz from Alternatiba. By constituencies, Bildu was the slate with the most votes in Gipuzkoa with 32.2% of the votes (9 parliamentarians), and the second in Álava (22.1% and 6 parliamentarians) and Biscay (21.5% and 6 parliamentarians).

=== 2014 European Parliament election ===
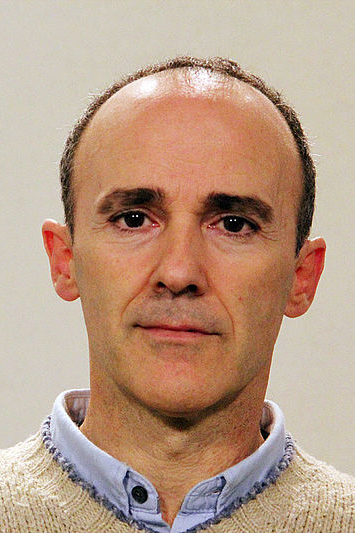
Josu Juaristi was the head of The Peoples Decide list for the 2014 European Parliament elections.

At the end of 2013, EH Bildu announced its willingness to participate in the elections to the European Parliament on May 25, 2014, with the intention of uniting all of Spain's sovereigntist forces under its candidacy. With a view to these elections but on the occasion of the World Economic Forum in Bilbao, the coalition held an international rally in that city on 2 March 2014, with the participation of political groups such as Sinn Féin, Syriza, Die Linke, the Left Bloc of Portugal and the BNG, among others.

After it became public that the ERC would run its own candidate and that the CUP and Nós-UP would not participate in these elections, EH Bildu finally formed The Peoples Decide coalition together with the BNG, Puyalón, Andecha Astur, Canarian Nationalist Alternative and Unity of the People. The slate, led by the former newspaper director Gara Josu Juaristi, obtained 326,464 votes (2.08%), which entitled it to one MEP. Thus, the EH Bildu candidate, Josu Juaristi, would occupy the seat for the first three and a half years of the legislature and the BNG candidate, Ana Miranda, for the remaining year and a half. The coalition was the first force in Gipuzkoa, with 31.69% of the votes, and for the first time in Álava, with 19.86%. It was also the second force in Biscay, with 20.25%, and in Navarra, with 20.21%.

The designation of the possible MEP generated a debate within EH Bildu, since both Aralar and Eusko Alkartasuna were members of the European Free Alliance, while Sortu showed during the campaign its preference for joining The Left in the European Parliament (GUE/NGL). After obtaining the seat, Josu Juaristi joined the latter group, although he announced that he would also maintain "a priority relationship" with the Greens–European Free Alliance, since the latter has political formations that defend his right.

=== 2015 and 2016 elections ===
In the 2015 local elections, EH Bildu was the second force in the Basque Country, only surpassed by the Basque Nationalist Party (EAJ-PNV). EAJ-PNV lost institutional power to Bildu in Gipuzkoa, losing several municipalities, including the mayor's office of the capital, San Sebastián. In this historic territory, EH Bildu obtained 29.87% of the votes and 398 councilors. In Biscay it was the second force with 19.85% and 394 councilors, and in Álava it was also the second force with 21.48%, surpassing the PNV by one tenth.

In Navarre, the nationalist coalition was the first force in number of councilors and second in number of votes. It obtained 297 councilors, thus surpassing the Navarrese People's Union (UPN), which dropped to 281. EH Bildu took many mayoralties from UPN, including Estella-Lizarra, Barañáin, Tafalla and Pamplona. Thus, Joseba Asiron became the first abertzale mayor of the Navarrese capital thanks to a government agreement between EH Bildu, Geroa Bai, Aranzadi and Izquierda-Ezkerra.

EH Bildu lost the Provincial Council of Gipuzkoa, which until then was governed by Bildu, by obtaining 28% of the votes and 17 members, compared to 31% and 18 members for the EAJ-PNV. In Álava, Bildu obtained 11 members with 20% of the votes, and in Biscay it obtained 18% and 11 members in the General Meetings.

In the elections to the Parliament of Navarre in 2015, EH Bildu obtained eight parliamentarians with 14.25% of the votes, which made it the third force in the autonomous community. Three of these parliamentarians were in turn members of EA (Maiorga Ramírez, Miren Aranoa and Esther Korres), three of Sortu (Adolfo Araiz, Bakartxo Ruiz and Dabid Anaut) and two of Aralar (Asun Fernández de Garaialde and Xabi Lasa). Later, Xabi Lasa would be replaced by Arantza Izurdiaga (Sortu).

The representatives of EH Bildu voted in favor of the investiture of Uxue Barkos along with Geroa Bai, Podemos and Izquierda-Ezkerra. The counselors of the Government of Navarre María José Beaumont (Presidency, Public Service, Interior and Justice) and Isabel Elizalde (Rural Development, Local Administration and Environment) were elected at the proposal of EH Bildu.

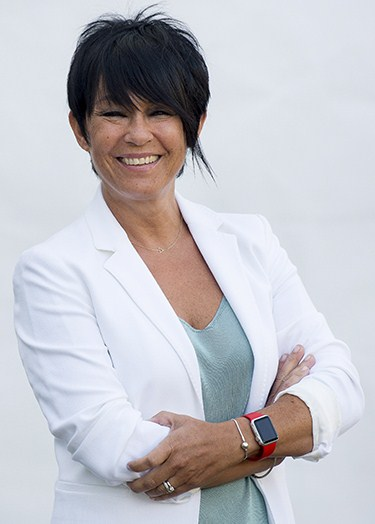
Maddalen Iriarte was the candidate chosen by EH Bildu for lehendakari in the 2016 investiture plenary session.

In the 2015 general elections in Spain, EH Bildu saw a decline in both votes and representatives compared to the results of Amaiur in 2011. In total it obtained 218,467 votes (0.87%) and two deputies were electedː Onintza Enbeita for Biscay and Marian Beitialarrangoitia by Gipuzkoa. After the new call for elections in 2016, EH Bildu renewed the electoral lists, but failed to improve its results by obtaining 184,092 votes (0.77%) and two deputies: Oskar Matute for Biscay and Marian Beitialarrangoitia for Gipuzkoa.

For the elections to the Basque Parliament in 2016, EH Bildu designated Arnaldo Otegi as its candidate for the presidency of the Basque Government, after the bases of the coalition decided so. However, the Electoral Board, later endorsed by the Constitutional Court, determined that Otegi could not be included on the electoral lists because he was disqualified from voting as part of his conviction for the Bateragune case.

EH Bildu obtained 225,172 (21.26%) votes and 18 parliamentarians. It maintained its status as the second force in the Basque Parliament, surpassed only by the PNV. Compared to the results obtained in the general elections in 2015 and 2016, EH Bildu experienced a recovery in both the number of votes and the percentage of the vote. Compared to the previous elections to the Basque Parliament in 2012, it lost three seats and more than 50,000 votes.

After obtaining her parliamentary certificate, journalist Maddalen Iriarte was elected spokesperson for the parliamentary group, as well as its candidate for lehendakari in the investiture plenary session.

=== Since 2017 ===
On 17 June 2017, EH Bildu was refounded as a permanent political structure to provide itself with its own bodies with executive capacity and open itself to the activism of independents, leaving behind the classic party coalition formula. Arnaldo Otegi was elected general coordinator.

Following this process, Aralar held its last congress on 2 December 2017, in which it was decided to dissolve, leaving the way open to members who thus decided to join EH Bildu. The decision was made when it considered its objective of having all human rights defended by the nationalist left fulfilled, while finding EH Bildu's internal democracy improved and accommodating for multiple ideological currents.

However, a critical segment belonging to Eusko Alkartasuna, led by Maiorga Ramírez and supported by its founder Carlos Garaikoetxea, opposed what they considered the marginalization of their party within EH Bildu in the face of the preeminence of Sortu. Critics demanded a return to the coalition's original idea of bringing together "a broad, progressive and nationalist bloc" and the establishment of "rules respectful of the pluralism typical of coalitions."

In the general elections of April 2019, EH Bildu increased its share of the vote by 74,934 to reach 259,647 votes (0.99%), resulting in four deputies being elected to Congress: Iñaki Ruiz de Pinedo, for Álava; Oskar Matute, who repeated for Biscay; Mertxe Aizpurua and Jon Iñarritu, both from Gipuzkoa. A senator for Gipuzkoa was also elected (in addition to the one EH Bildu had by territorial designation): Gorka Elejabarrieta.

In October, EH Bildu signed, together with Junts per Catalunya, Esquerra Republicana de Catalunya, Popular Unity Candidacy, Galician Nationalist Bloc, Crida Nacional, Demòcrates de Catalunya, Catalan European Democratic Party, Esquerra Valenciana, República Valenciana, Més per Mallorca and Més per Menorca, a declaration with which all the signatories committed to act together in the defense of the right to self-determination.

In the repeat elections held on 10 November, Bildu obtained 277,621 votes (1.14%), that is, 17,974 more, and the election of Bel Pozueta, its fifth representative in the lower house, for the Navarre constituency.

EH Bildu was the political force with the most votes in the Basque Country and Navarre as a whole and the one that won the most mayoralties in the 2023 municipal elections.

In 2023, a complaint was filed by Covite over the inclusion of several candidates who had been convicted of belonging to and collaborating with ETA among the more than 300 EH Bildu lists for the municipal elections in the Basque Country and Navarre. Seven of these, who especially stood out for having been convicted in a summary process with fatalities, announced that they would resign from their positions if they were elected to show their commitment to coexistence and peace, and this took effect after several of them managed to win. in several locations in the Basque Country. Although Covite called this withdrawal a victory, the controversy was fueled by the request to outlaw EH Bildu presented by Vox, the president of the Community of Madrid Díaz Ayuso and the Dignidad y Justicia association, which was rejected by the Prosecutor's Office. Spanish Prime Minister Pedro Sánchez was also attacked for his agreements with the coalition.

== Ideological bases ==
The formations that formalized the coalition signed a long-term strategic agreement to offer Basque citizens "a project of national sovereignty and true social transformation", which opted for "the construction of viable alternatives that position the economy as a tool at the service of citizenship", such as the creation of a Basque Public Fund, in addition to putting political and economic sovereignty "at the service of a new economic, ecological and social model, a fair redistribution of wealth and the fight against social exclusion, which has its fundamental reference in the working social majority. The agreement included other commitments related to "the consolidation of a scenario of non-violence with guarantees and the reestablishment of democratic minimums", the Basque language, the fight for equality between women and men, defense of education, the field of youth, in favor of internationalism and against racism and xenophobia.

EH Bildu defines itself ideologically as a left-wing force for Basque national sovereignty, whose purpose is the achievement of an independent Euskal Herria based on social justice. In this sense, since January 2015 it has maintained a preferential relationship with Euskal Herria Bai in the French Basque Country aimed at the creation of a Basque State, admitting that each region follows its own rhythms as it finds itself in a different starting situation.

== Composition ==
Party
| Basque Solidarity (EA) |
| Alternative (Alternatiba) |
| Create (Sortu) |
Former members
| Aralar |

== Electoral performance ==
=== Regional parliaments ===
==== Basque Parliament ====
Basque Parliament
| Election | Leading candidate | Votes | % | Seats | +/– | Government |
| 2012 | Laura Mintegi | 277,923 | 24.67 (#2) | 21 / 75 | 16 (Note: Compared to the combined totals of Aralar and Eusko Alkartasuna in the 2009 regional election.) | Opposition |
| 2016 | Arnaldo Otegi (Note: Sortu Secretary-General Arnaldo Otegi was proclaimed as EH Bildu's leading candidate on 24 May 2016, having left the Logroño prison on 1 March after serving his full prison sentence imposed for attempting to reorganize the banned Batasuna party. On 24 August, the Gipuzkoa Provincial Electoral Commission disqualified Otegi due to a legal barring from holding any public office still in force until 2021. Subsequently, EH Bildu did not elect an alternative candidate to replace Otegi, though journalist Maddalen Iriarte—second in EH Bildu Gipuzkoa's list—went on to top the list as provided for in Article 65.2 of the Electoral Law of the Basque Country.) | 225,172 | 21.13 (#2) | 18 / 75 | 3 | Opposition |
| 2020 | Maddalen Iriarte | 249,580 | 27.60 (#2) | 21 / 75 | 3 | Opposition |
| 2024 | Pello Otxandiano | 343,609 | 32.13 (#2) | 27 / 75 | 6 | Opposition |

==== Parliament of Navarre ====
Parliament of Navarre
| Election | Leading candidate | Votes | % | Seats | +/– | Government |
| 2011 | Maiorga Ramírez | 42,916 | 13.28 (#4) | 7 / 50 | 7 | Opposition |
| 2015 | Adolfo Araiz | 48,166 | 14.25 (#3) | 8 / 50 | 1 | Coalition |
| 2019 | Bakartxo Ruiz | 50,631 | 14.54 (#4) | 7 / 50 | 1 | Opposition |
| 2023 | Laura Aznal | 56,535 | 17.13 (#3) | 9 / 50 | 2 | Opposition |

=== Cortes Generales ===
==== Nationwide ====
Cortes Generales
| Election | Congress | | | | Senate | | Government |
| Election | Votes | % | Seats | +/– | Seats | +/– | Government |
| 2015 | 219,125 | 0.87 (#10) | 2 / 350 | 5 (Note: Compared to Amaiur totals in the 2011 general election.) | 0 / 208 | 2 | Opposition |
| 2016 | 184,713 | 0.77 (#9) | 2 / 350 | 0 | 0 / 208 | 0 | Opposition |
| Apr. 2019 | 259,647 | 0.99 (#10) | 4 / 350 | 2 | 1 / 208 | 1 | Opposition |
| Nov. 2019 | 277,621 | 1.14 (#10) | 5 / 350 | 1 | 1 / 208 | 0 | Opposition |
| 2023 | 335,129 | 1.36 (#7) | 6 / 350 | 1 | 4 / 208 | 3 | Confidence and supply |

==== Regional breakdown ====
| Election | Basque Country | | | | | |
| Election | Congress | | | | Senate | |
| Election | Votes | % | Seats | +/– | Seats | +/– |
|---|---|---|---|---|---|---|
| 2015 | 184,186 | 15.06 (#3) | 2 / 18 | 4 | 0 / 12 | 2 |
| 2016 | 153,339 | 13.28 (#4) | 2 / 18 | 0 | 0 / 12 | 0 |
| Apr. 2019 | 212,882 | 16.68 (#4) | 4 / 18 | 2 | 1 / 12 | 1 |
| Nov. 2019 | 221,073 | 18.67 (#3) | 4 / 18 | 0 | 1 / 12 | 0 |
| 2023 | 274,676 | 23.95 (#3) | 5 / 18 | 1 | 4 / 12 | 3 |

| Election | Navarre | | | | | |
| Election | Congress | | | | Senate | |
| Election | Votes | % | Seats | +/– | Seats | +/– |
|---|---|---|---|---|---|---|
| 2015 | 34,939 | 9.89 (#4) | 0 / 5 | 1 | 0 / 4 | 0 |
| 2016 | 31,374 | 9.36 (#4) | 0 / 5 | 0 | 0 / 4 | 0 |
| Apr. 2019 | 46,765 | 12.74 (#4) | 0 / 5 | 0 | 0 / 4 | 0 |
| Nov. 2019 | 56,548 | 16.88 (#3) | 1 / 5 | 1 | 0 / 4 | 0 |
| 2023 | 58,686 | 17.31 (#2) | 1 / 5 | 0 | 0 / 4 | 0 |

=== European Parliament ===
European Parliament
| Election | Total | | | | Basque Country | | Navarre | |
| Election | Votes | % | Seats | +/– | Votes | % | Votes | % |
| 2014 | Within LPD | | 1 / 54 | 1 | 177,694 | 23.36 (#2) | 44,129 | 20.21 (#2) |
| 2019 | Within AR | | 1 / 59 | 0 | 246,937 | 22.01 (#2) | 54,406 | 15.99 (#3) |
| 2024 | Within AR | | 1 / 61 | 0 | 227.973 | 26.24 (#1) | 48,762 | 18.75 (#3) |

== Public profile ==
=== Links to ETA ===
Although it is a member of pacifist political groups such as Eusko Alkartasuna, Alternatiba and Aralar (dissolved in 2017) and Sortu was endorsed by the Constitutional Court, EH Bildu has been described by some conservative media as the heir of the banned separatist group ETA. Victims' associations such as Covite have criticized the presence of their leaders at tributes to former members of the armed organization, and the militancy in ETA in the youth of its general coordinator Arnaldo Otegi, as well as some of the Sortu affiliates, has also been pointed out. For his part, Otegi has reiterated on several occasions EH Bildu's commitment against ETA violence, rejecting public receptions of released prisoners, as well as his support for the victims, expressing his regret for the suffering caused.

== Bibliography ==
- Mabry, Tristan James; McGarry, John; Moore, Margaret; O'Leary, Brendan (2013). Divided Nations and European Integration. University of Pennsylvania Press. p. 134. ISBN 978-0812244977.
