= Alternatiba (Basque political party) =

Alternative Alternatiba
- Spokesperson: Oskar Matute
- Founded: 29 April 2009
- Split from: Ezker Anitza
- Headquarters: Plaza Venezuela, 1, 1º izda., 48001 - Bilbao, Basque Country
- Ideology: Socialism; Environmentalism; Feminism; Anti-capitalism; Left-wing nationalism Internationalism; Basque independence
- Political position: Left-wing to far-left
- National affiliation: EH Bildu
- Trade union affiliation: Langile Abertzaleen Batzordeak
- Basque Parliament: 2 / 75
- Congress of Deputies: 1 / 23

Website
- alternatiba.net

Alternatiba (English: Alternative), sometimes known as Alternatiba Eraikitzen (English: Building the Alternative) in Basque, is a socialist political party. It is active in Navarre and Basque country. Although, its bylaws also state that French Basque Country is under its political scope. Founded in 2009, Alternatiba was born as a critical tendency within Ezker Anitza, the Izquierda Unida (IU) affiliate in the Basque Country, opposing a participation in the Basque government along with the PNV and Eusko Alkartasuna. In 2009 this tendency broke away from IU and formed an independent party.

== History ==
In May 2008, the seventh assembly of the United Left-Greens had taken place. A faction led by then parliamentarian Oskar Matute and others who would later become members of Alternatiba Eraikitzen (“Building the Alternative”) ran for the leadership of the party. They received the support of the Basque Nationalist Party and Eusko Alkartasuna. Both groups coincided in their commitment to abandon the United Left-Greens, they thought that it limited its left-wing projection. Both groups coincided in their commitment to abandon the tripartite pact of the Basque Government. However, a last-minute agreement of the Communist Party of the Basque Country, which until then had also disagreed with the management of the general coordinator. Both the Communist party of Basque Country and the soon to be Alternatiba allowed Javier Madrazo to remain the head of the party

Alternatiba Eraikitzen was constituted in Bilbao on 13 December 2008, with the aim of “recomposing a strong political left with a future perspective”, as declared by its promoters, and was registered in the register of political parties of the Ministry of the Interior on 2 February 2009. They did not abandon the United Left-Greens, however, until the resignation of Madrazo as general coordinator as a result of the formation in the elections to the Basque Parliament in 2009. Thus, on 29 April of that same year, the members of Alternatiba Eraikitzen announced the abandonment of Ezker Batua due to their disagreement with the decisions adopted by the party's leadership, adopting the name Alternatiba and declaring their intention to become an autonomous political party, with the participation of militants from Ezker Gogoa (a split from Zutik) and other social movements.

At that time its representatives claimed to have 200 militants, which would represent 15% of the militancy of Ezker Batua-Berdeak. On 31 October 2009, the constituent assembly was held, defining Alternatiba as a political organization "clearly of the left","radically democratic, non-violent and anti-capitalist", "of social alternative, sovereignist and euskaltzale" (Basque-speaking), "feminist and environmentalist."

=== Sovereigntist left ===
A year later, on 30 October 2010, they held their first National Assembly, in which they opted for the strategic confluence of left-wing sovereigntist parties on the basis of a decalogue of principles, and announced a round of contacts with Eusko Alkartasuna (EA), Aralar and the outlawed nationalist left (with whom they had already signed the Guernica Agreement) to achieve this union for the local and regional elections of 2011. In January 2011, Alternativas for the sovereigntist left (Alternativas de la izquierda soberanista), a party of the Basque sovereignist left, was founded in the Basque Country.

== See also ==
- Batasuna
