= United Left–Greens =

United Left–Greens Ezker Batua–Berdeak
- Founded: 1986
- Dissolved: 28 January 2012 (Ezker Anitza split); 19 September 2014
- Headquarters: C/ Fernández del Campo, 24, 48010 Bilbao, Basque Country
- Ideology: Eco-socialism; Republicanism
- Political position: Left-wing
- National affiliation: United Left (1986–2011)

Website
- www.ezkerbatua-berdeak.org

United Left–Greens (Basque: Ezker Batua–Berdeak, EB–B) was a left wing environmentalist political party in Spain. Javier Madrazo led the party as general coordinator from 1994 to 2009.

In the 1994 Basque elections EB won 93,291 votes (9.15%) and gained its first six seats in the Basque Parliament. It was a member of the Basque Government for 8 years (between 2001 and 2009), supporting Juan José Ibarretxe of the Basque Nationalist Party as lehendakari. In 2009 it obtained 36,134 votes (3.51%). Its remaining MP in the Basque Parliament, Mikel Arana, the general coordinator, lost his seat in the 2012 Basque parliamentary elections, leaving the party without representation there.

In January 2012, following a period of internal strife, EB joined the Communist Party of the Basque Country and the Alternative Plural Rally (EPA) in founding a new party named Ezker Anitza (Plural Left).
