= Opinion polling for the 2023 Spanish local elections (Castilla–La Mancha) =

In the run up to the 2023 Spanish local elections, various organisations carried out opinion polling to gauge voting intention in local entities in Spain. Results of such polls for municipalities in Castilla–La Mancha are displayed in this article. The date range for these opinion polls is from the previous local elections, held on 26 May 2019, to the day the next elections were held, on 28 May 2023.

Polls are listed in reverse chronological order, showing the most recent first and using the dates when the survey fieldwork was done, as opposed to the date of publication. Where the fieldwork dates are unknown, the date of publication is given instead. The highest percentage figure in each polling survey is displayed with its background shaded in the leading party's colour. If a tie ensues, this is applied to the figures with the highest percentages. The "Lead" columns on the right shows the percentage-point difference between the parties with the highest percentages in a given poll.

== Municipalities ==
=== Albacete ===
Color key:

Poll conducted after legal ban on opinion polls

Polling firm/Commissioner	Fieldwork date	Sample size	Turnout	PSOE	PP	CS	Unidas Podemos	Vox	Lead
2023 municipal election	28 May 2023	—N/a	66.1	34.0; 10	38.2; 12	3.4; 0	6.0; 1	15.4; 4	4.2
GAD3/RTVE–FORTA	12–27 May 2023	?	?	29.0; 8/9	42.0; 13	3.0; 0	9.0; 2	12.0; 3/4	13.0
UCLM	6–12 May 2023	3,082	?	? 10/11	? 9/10	? 0/1	? 1/2	? 4/5	?
EM-Analytics/Electomanía	13 May–8 Oct 2021	352	?	34.8; 10	35.9; 10	5.1; 1	10.6; 3	10.6; 3	1.1
2019 municipal election	26 May 2019	—N/a	62.2	31.1; 9	29.9; 9	18.3; 5	10.8; 3	6.6; 1	1.2

=== Ciudad Real ===
Color key:

Poll conducted after legal ban on opinion polls

Polling firm/Commissioner	Fieldwork date	Sample size	Turnout	PSOE	PP	CS	Unidas Podemos	Vox	Lead
2023 municipal election	28 May 2023	—N/a	67.6	34.5; 9	39.7; 11	5.0; 1	4.9; 0	14.4; 4	5.2
GAD3/RTVE–FORTA	12–27 May 2023	?	?	39.0; 10/11	40.0; 10/11	2.0; 0	5.0; 1	11.0; 3	1.0
2019 municipal election	26 May 2019	—N/a	64.6	38.7; 10	33.0; 9	12.5; 3	7.6; 2	6.8; 1	5.7

=== Cuenca ===
Color key:

Poll conducted after legal ban on opinion polls

Polling firm/Commissioner	Fieldwork date	Sample size	Turnout	PSOE	CNU	PP	CS	Unidas Podemos	Vox	+CU	Lead
2023 municipal election	28 May 2023	—N/a	66.2	35.0; 10	8.4; 2	31.7; 9	1.8; 0	8.0; 2	8.0; 2	3.6; 0	3.3
GAD3/RTVE–FORTA	12–27 May 2023	?	?	39.0; 11/12	? 1	31.0; 9	–	5.0; 1	9.0; 2	? 0/1	8.0
2019 municipal election	26 May 2019	—N/a	66.7	36.2; 10	22.4; 9	21.0; 3	5.8; 2	5.5; 1	3.6; 0	–	13.8

=== Guadalajara ===
Color key:

Poll conducted after legal ban on opinion polls

Polling firm/Commissioner	Fieldwork date	Sample size	Turnout	PSOE	PP	CS	Vox	Unidas Podemos	AIKE	Lead
2023 municipal election	28 May 2023	—N/a	68.1	40.4; 11	31.5; 9	1.8; 0	15.8; 4	3.4; 0	5.2; 1	8.9
GAD3/RTVE–FORTA	12–27 May 2023	?	?	39.0; 11	33.0; 9/10	? 0	11.0; 3	5.0; 0/1	? 1	6.0
Idus3/GuadaTV Media	7–24 Nov 2022	700	?	46.2; 13/14	28.4; 7/8	3.9; 0	12.4; 3/4	5.6; 0/1	2.8; 0	17.8
Celeste-Tel/Nueva Alcarria	18–29 Apr 2022	600	68.5	39.7; 11	28.7; 7	5.5; 1	14.3; 4	5.3; 1	6.5; 1	11.0
EM-Analytics/Electomanía	14 May–10 Oct 2021	365	?	33.3; 10	36.4; 10	4.6; 0	13.0; 3	4.7; 0	6.8; 2	3.1
2019 municipal election	26 May 2019	—N/a	68.5	35.2; 10	31.2; 8	12.2; 3	7.7; 2	7.0; 1	6.1; 1	4.0

=== Illescas ===
Polling firm/Commissioner	Fieldwork date	Sample size	Turnout	PSOE	PP	CS	Unidas Podemos	Vox	Lead
2023 municipal election	28 May 2023	—N/a	62.7	50.3; 11	31.8; 7	–	3.5; 0	13.3; 3	18.5
Data10	27 Feb–1 Mar 2023	400	?	38.7; 9	33.1; 8	2.2; 0	6.8; 1	16.4; 3	5.6
2019 municipal election	26 May 2019	—N/a	60.1	52.5; 12	24.1; 5	13.4; 3	7.4; 1	–	28.4

=== Talavera de la Reina ===
Color key:

Poll conducted after legal ban on opinion polls

Polling firm/Commissioner	Fieldwork date	Sample size	Turnout	PSOE	PP	Vox	CS	Unidas Podemos	NT	Lead
2023 municipal election	28 May 2023	—N/a	64.0	44.4; 12	32.1; 9	14.6; 4	–	3.7; 0	3.0; 0	12.3
GAD3/RTVE–FORTA	12–27 May 2023	?	?	45.0; 13	29.0; 8/9	13.0; 3/4	–	–	–	16.0
Data10/PP	16–17 May 2023	700	?	36.1; 11	34.5; 10	11.9; 3	–	4.1; 0	6.0; 1	1.6
Data10/PP	24–25 Apr 2023	700	?	36.9; 11	33.2; 10	13.2; 3	–	4.3; 0	6.2; 1	3.7
GAD3/PP	6–13 Feb 2023	600	65.1	39.6; 12	37.0; 10	10.1; 3	1.4; 0	3.2; 0	–	2.6
2019 municipal election	26 May 2019	—N/a	63.2	46.6; 14	20.0; 5	11.9; 3	10.9; 3	4.1; 0	–	26.6

=== Toledo ===
Color key:

Poll conducted after legal ban on opinion polls

Polling firm/Commissioner	Fieldwork date	Sample size	Turnout	PSOE	PP	CS	Vox	Unidas Podemos	Lead
2023 municipal election	28 May 2023	—N/a	70.1	38.8; 11	31.9; 9	3.3; 0	13.7; 4	6.3; 1	6.9
GAD3/RTVE–FORTA	12–27 May 2023	?	?	42.0; 12	35.0; 9/10	? 0	10.0; 2/3	6.0; 1	7.0
IO Investigación/La Tribuna	3–17 Apr 2023	1,000	?	54.5; 14/15	28.2; 8/9	3.7; 0	5.3; 1/2	5.2; 0/1	26.3
Sigma Dos/El Mundo	18–24 Nov 2022	400	?	48.8; 14/15	29.9; 8	1.1; 0	11.2; 3	4.6; 0/1	18.9
SW Demoscopia/La Tribuna	23–25 Nov 2021	420	62.2	44.4; 12	33.2; 8	5.1; 1	8.0; 2	7.6; 2	11.2
La Tribuna	14 Jun 2021	?	66	42.0; 12	35.1; 9	–	11.7; 3	6.9; 1	6.9
2019 municipal election	26 May 2019	—N/a	69.8	44.2; 12	25.5; 6	12.6; 3	8.3; 2	8.1; 2	18.7
