= Opinion polling for the 2023 Spanish local elections (Castile and León) =

In the run up to the 2023 Spanish local elections, various organisations carried out opinion polling to gauge voting intention in local entities in Spain. Results of such polls for municipalities in Castile and León are displayed in this article. The date range for these opinion polls is from the previous local elections, held on 26 May 2019, to the day the next elections were held, on 28 May 2023.

Polls are listed in reverse chronological order, showing the most recent first and using the dates when the survey fieldwork was done, as opposed to the date of publication. Where the fieldwork dates are unknown, the date of publication is given instead. The highest percentage figure in each polling survey is displayed with its background shaded in the leading party's colour. If a tie ensues, this is applied to the figures with the highest percentages. The "Lead" columns on the right shows the percentage-point difference between the parties with the highest percentages in a given poll.

== Municipalities ==
=== Ávila ===
Polling firm/Commissioner	Fieldwork date	Sample size	Turnout	XAV	PP	PSOE	CS	Vox	IUCyL	Podemos	Unidas Podemos	Lead
2023 municipal election	28 May 2023	—N/a	71.5	38.4; 11	26.1; 7	15.5; 4	2.3; 0	9.9; 0	(Note: Within Unidas Podemos.)		4.8; 0	12.3
Sigma Dos/RTVCyL	10–16 May 2023	500	?	30.0; 8/9	31.6; 8/9	18.1; 5	3.2; 0	8.1; 2			5.4; 1	1.6
Sigma Dos/RTVCyL	15–23 Mar 2023	400	?	25.6; 7/8	29.1; 8/9	21.3; 5/6	6.3; 1	7.5; 2			6.2; 1	3.5
2019 municipal election	26 May 2019	—N/a	71.5	35.1; 11	21.6; 6	19.3; 6	8.5; 2	4.4; 0	2.7; 0	1.6; 0	–	13.5

=== Benavente ===
Polling firm/Commissioner	Fieldwork date	Sample size	Turnout	PSOE	PP	CS	IUCyL	Vox	UPL	ZSí	Lead
2023 municipal election	28 May 2023	—N/a	60.8	35.9; 7	41.0; 8	3.7; 0	5.6; 1	6.3; 1	1.2; 0	1.8; 0	5.1
Metroscopia/La Opinión	15–16 May 2023	?	61	39.1; 7/8	39.8; 7/8	–	5.2; 0/1	6.6; 1	–	2.8; 0	0.7
2019 municipal election	26 May 2019	—N/a	63.7	40.0; 8	29.7; 6	13.5; 2	6.9; 1	3.5; 0	2.6; 0	–	10.3

=== Burgos ===
Polling firm/Commissioner	Fieldwork date	Sample size	Turnout	PSOE	PP	CS	Vox	Podemos	Imagina Burgos	Unidas Podemos	DCD	EV	Lead
2023 municipal election	28 May 2023	—N/a	63.7	35.0; 12	32.6; 11	2.3; 0	12.7; 4			5.0; 0	4.0; 0	1.3; 0	2.4
Sigma Dos/RTVCyL	6–13 May 2023	800	?	36.5; 11/12	31.5; 9/10	3.8; 0	13.1; 4			7.0; 2	2.5; 0	3.1; 0	5.0
IAP/UBU	21 Apr–1 May 2023	500	?	? 10/11	? 9/10	? 0	? 4			? 2	? 1/2	–	?
Sigma Dos/RTVCyL	13–21 Mar 2023	521	65.9	35.4; 10/11	34.4; 10/11	3.1; 0	13.0; 4			9.1; 2	–	–	1.0
Celeste-Tel/Radio Arlanzón	15 Feb–1 Mar 2023	620	?	37.8; 11	35.3; 10	6.0; 1	9.0; 2			11.7; 3	–	–	2.5
NC Report/PP	12–22 Dec 2022	600	?	34.4; 11	39.1; 12	4.1; 0	8.2; 2	7.1; 2	–	–	–	–	4.7
NC Report/PP	1–8 Sep 2022	600	66.5	34.2; 10	39.0; 12	4.2; 0	9.3; 3	6.9; 2	–	–	–	–	4.8
2019 municipal election	26 May 2019	—N/a	67.1	36.2; 11	25.9; 7	16.9; 5	7.2; 2	6.6; 2	4.7; 0	–	–	–	10.3

=== Cacabelos ===
Polling firm/Commissioner	Fieldwork date	Sample size	Turnout	PP	PSOE	SxC	IUCyL	CS	CB	UPL	Lead
2023 municipal election	28 May 2023	—N/a	66.7	36.6; 4	46.5; 6	–	8.8; 1	–	2.0; 0	4.8; 0	7.4
Huaris CC/InfoBierzo (Note: Undecided and/or abstentionists excluded.)	2–9 May 2023	212	?	38.2; 4/5	39.7; 5	–	16.2; 1/2	–	0.0; 0	5.9; 0	1.5
2019 municipal election	26 May 2019	—N/a	71.6	33.1; 5	25.7; 4	15.8; 2	13.0; 2	6.2; 0	3.0; 0	–	7.4

=== La Bañeza ===
Polling firm/Commissioner	Fieldwork date	Sample size	Turnout	PP	PSOE	CS	Vox	Podemos	UPL	Lead
2023 municipal election	28 May 2023	—N/a	63.6	42.7; 8	30.6; 5	6.4; 1	10.2; 2	–	8.9; 1	12.1
SyM Consulting/La Nueva Crónica	7–12 Apr 2023	?	63.1	33.0; 6	40.4; 7/8	8.6; 1/2	8.0; 1	5.1; 1	2.0; 0	7.4
2019 municipal election	26 May 2019	—N/a	67.5	34.8; 6	33.7; 6	18.2; 3	5.7; 1	5.0; 1	1.7; 0	1.1

=== León ===
Polling firm/Commissioner	Fieldwork date	Sample size	Turnout	PSOE	PP	CS	UPL	Podemos	Vox	IU	Unidas Podemos	Lead
2023 municipal election	28 May 2023	—N/a	60.6	35.3; 11	29.0; 9	1.8; 0	19.1; 5		8.9; 2		3.4; 0	6.3
Sigma Dos/RTVCyL	6–12 May 2023	800	?	33.5; 9/10	32.8; 9/10	1.6; 0	14.5; 4		11.3; 3		5.9; 2	0.7
Sigma Dos/RTVCyL	13–22 Mar 2023	500	?	27.8; 8/9	31.1; 9/10	2.6; 0	15.8; 5		11.4; 3		6.6; 2	3.4
Celeste-Tel/Diario de León	6–20 Mar 2023	500	65.5	30.8; 10	35.9; 12	4.6; 0	11.1; 3	4.1; 0	8.3; 2	3.5; 0	–	5.1
SyM Consulting/La Nueva Crónica	20 Dec–8 Jan 2023	1,200	55.1	31.9; 9/10	30.0; 8/9	3.8; 0	13.4; 4	6.7; 2	10.1; 3	–	–	1.9
ElectoPanel/Electomanía	1 Apr–15 Jun 2020	?	?	34.1; 11	30.5; 9	5.2; 1	11.4; 3	4.1; 0	10.9; 3	–	–	3.6
2019 municipal election	26 May 2019	—N/a	64.0	32.1; 10	29.6; 9	14.0; 4	9.4; 3	5.3; 1	5.0; 0	2.3; 0	–	2.5

=== Palencia ===
Polling firm/Commissioner	Fieldwork date	Sample size	Turnout	PSOE	PP	CS	Vox	GP	Podemos	Unidas Podemos	VP	Lead
2023 municipal election	28 May 2023	—N/a	64.3	36.8; 10	31.5; 8	3.2; 0	11.1; 3			5.2; 1	10.6; 3	5.3
Sigma Dos/RTVCyL	6–12 May 2023	500	?	35.6; 9/10	38.1; 10/11	5.7; 1	6.8; 1/2			9.0; 2	3.9; 0	2.5
Sigma Dos/RTVCyL	13–21 Mar 2023	420	?	31.1; 8/9	39.4; 11	5.9; 1	9.9; 2			10.4; 2/3	2.1; 0	8.3
2019 municipal election	26 May 2019	—N/a	67.8	37.9; 11	33.4; 9	11.9; 3	6.1; 1	5.6; 1	3.3; 0	–	–	4.5

=== Ponferrada ===
Polling firm/Commissioner	Fieldwork date	Sample size	Turnout	PSOE	PP	CB	CS	USE	PRB	Podemos	IU	VIAs	Vox	UPL	Lead
2023 municipal election	28 May 2023	—N/a	58.7	33.7; 11	30.8; 10	8.6; 2	–	–	4.7; 0	4.8; 0	1.4; 0	0.6; 0	7.4; 2	4.7; 0	2.9
Sigma Dos/RTVCyL	10–17 May 2023	500	?	36.9; 10/12	29.6; 8/10	7.3; 2	–	–	4.8; 0/1	4.5; 0/1	1.9; 0	0.3; 0	7.6; 2	4.7; 0/1	7.3
Huaris CC/InfoBierzo	2–9 May 2023	1,011	?	35.6; 10	26.1; 8	9.5; 2	–	–	6.7; 1	8.2; 1/2	0.7; 0	–	8.3; 2	4.8; 0/1	9.5
IMC/Noticias Bierzo	15–22 Mar 2023	705	58.3	29.4; 8/9	26.7; 6/8	4.9; 0/1	0.4; 0	5.9; 1/2	5.1; 1/2	4.1; 0/1	–	3.3; 0/1	12.8; 2/3	7.4; 1/2	2.7
Sigma Dos/RTVCyL	13–22 Mar 2023	400	?	33.9; 10/11	25.8; 8	6.2; 1/2	2.1; 0	5.3; 1	5.2; 1	6.1; 1/2	1.8; 0	–	6.0; 1	4.1; 0	8.1
Celeste-Tel/Diario de León	6–16 Mar 2023	400	62.9	31.6; 9	29.3; 8	9.1; 2	2.2; 0	8.4; 2	7.3; 2	6.7; 2	3.1; 0	–	–	–	2.3
SyM Consulting/La Nueva Crónica	3–7 Feb 2023	764	55.3	29.2; 8	27.0; 7/8	11.1; 3	1.0; 0	–	9.2; 2	8.4; 2	–	–	9.5; 2/3	–	2.2
Huaris CC/InfoBierzo	22–30 Apr 2021	423	?	? 8/9	? 8	? 1/2	? 0	? 1/2	? 1/2	? 1/2	–	–	? 3/4	–	?
2019 municipal election	26 May 2019	—N/a	61.3	32.1; 9	22.9; 6	9.2; 2	8.2; 2	7.9; 2	7.3; 2	7.1; 2	2.4; 0	0.7; 0	–	–	9.2

=== Salamanca ===
Polling firm/Commissioner	Fieldwork date	Sample size	Turnout	PP	PSOE	CS	Unidas Podemos	Vox	UPL	SMS	SV	Lead
2023 municipal election	28 May 2023	—N/a	60.4	43.9; 14	30.1; 10	3.6; 0	4.8; 0	11.0; 3	0.7; 0	1.3; 0	0.8; 0	13.8
Sigma Dos/RTVCyL	8–16 May 2023	800	?	39.7; 12/13	32.7; 10	4.5; 0	7.0; 2	9.7; 2/3	–	3.0; 0	1.5; 0	7.0
Sigma Dos/RTVCyL	13–22 Mar 2023	639	?	36.6; 11/12	32.5; 10	5.1; 0/1	8.4; 2	10.2; 2/3	2.6; 0	–	–	4.1
Sigma Dos/El Mundo	10–16 Mar 2023	512	?	36.4; 11/12	31.7; 9	5.2; 0/1	8.3; 2	11.9; 3	3.1; 0	–	–	4.7
2019 municipal election	26 May 2019	—N/a	63.4	36.1; 11	34.0; 10	15.5; 4	7.6; 2	4.5; 0	0.2; 0	–	–	2.1

=== San Andrés del Rabanedo ===
Polling firm/Commissioner	Fieldwork date	Sample size	Turnout	PSOE	PP	CS	UPL	Vox	IUCyL	Podemos	Unidas Podemos	Lead
2019 municipal election	26 May 2019	—N/a	56.5	21.1; 4	25.4; 6	5.3; 1	25.6; 6	12.7; 3			6.4; 1	0.2
SyM Consulting/La Nueva Crónica	14–19 Mar 2023	647	71.9	31.0; 7/8	18.1; 4	4.4; 0	9.3; 2	22.2; 5/6	6.6; 1	5.8; 1	–	8.8
2019 municipal election	26 May 2019	—N/a	59.7	35.1; 8	20.6; 5	12.3; 3	10.8; 2	6.5; 1	6.4; 1	5.5; 1	–	14.5

=== Segovia ===
Polling firm/Commissioner	Fieldwork date	Sample size	Turnout	PSOE	PP	CS	IU	Podemos	Vox	Lead
2023 municipal election	28 May 2023	—N/a	66.0	26.7; 7	44.6; 12	5.4; 1	7.7; 2	5.5; 1	8.9; 2	17.9
Sigma Dos/RTVCyL	6–13 May 2023	800	?	29.3; 8/9	43.2; 12/13	2.7; 0	6.4; 1	6.3; 1	10.2; 2/3	13.9
Sigma Dos/RTVCyL	13–22 Mar 2023	400	?	29.0; 8/9	42.8; 12/13	2.3; 0	9.3; 2	2.0; 0	9.0; 2	13.8
SW Demoscopia/PSOE	Mar 2023	?	?	? 9/10	? 11/12	? 0	? 1/2	? 1/2	? 1/2	?
NC Report/El Adelantado	27 Sep–10 Oct 2022	500	71.3	32.8; 9	41.3; 12	2.7; 0	7.6; 2	4.6; 0	7.2; 2	8.5
2019 municipal election	26 May 2019	—N/a	68.4	33.3; 10	31.5; 9	13.2; 3	7.4; 2	5.2; 1	4.8; 0	1.8

=== Soria ===
Polling firm/Commissioner	Fieldwork date	Sample size	Turnout	PSOE	PP	CS	Podemos	IU	Vox	Lead
2023 municipal election	28 May 2023	—N/a	59.6	48.5; 12	30.2; 7	2.2; 0	4.6; 0	3.8; 0	8.1; 2	18.3
Sigma Dos/RTVCyL	6–12 May 2023	500	?	45.9; 10/11	30.5; 7	2.1; 0	4.8; 0/1	5.1; 0/1	9.6; 2	15.4
Sigma Dos/RTVCyL	14–23 Mar 2023	639	?	44.1; 10/11	26.4; 6	1.3; 0	8.4; 1/2	5.4; 1	8.8; 2	17.7
2019 municipal election	26 May 2019	—N/a	63.0	49.5; 12	23.2; 6	8.5; 2	6.2; 1	3.9; 0	3.9; 0	26.3

=== Toro ===
Polling firm/Commissioner	Fieldwork date	Sample size	Turnout	PSOE	PP	CS	Vox	UPL	MpT	ZSí	F	Lead
2023 municipal election	28 May 2023	—N/a	67.4	27.0; 4	31.7; 4	–	2.4; 0	0.3; 0	20.6; 3	6.6; 1	10.6; 1	4.7
Metroscopia/La Opinión	15–16 May 2023	?	70	21.9; 3/4	25.6; 3	–	12.9; 1/2	4.2; 0	26.8; 3/4	5.6; 0	3.0; 0	1.2
2019 municipal election	26 May 2019	—N/a	69.1	51.2; 8	24.8; 3	18.3; 2	–	–	–	–	–	26.4

=== Valladolid ===
Polling firm/Commissioner	Fieldwork date	Sample size	Turnout	PSOE	PP	CS	VTLP	Vox	Podemos	Unidas Podemos	CA	Lead
2023 municipal election	28 May 2023	—N/a	67.2	36.7; 11	36.2; 11	2.0; 0	9.0; 2	11.7; 3	(Note: Within VTLP.)	–	1.7; 0	0.5
Sigma Dos/RTVCyL	5–11 May 2023	800	?	36.5; 11	33.9; 10	1.8; 0	12.1; 3	10.7; 3		–	1.9; 0	2.6
Data10/Okdiario	5–9 May 2023	1,500	?	34.1; 10	35.8; 10	2.9; 0	13.3; 4	10.1; 3		–	–	1.7
GAD3/Vocento	5–6 May 2023	504	?	38.8; 11/12	36.3; 11	2.5; 0	9.2; 2	10.1; 2/3		–	–	2.5
CIS	10–26 Apr 2023	802	?	37.6; 11/12	33.2; 9/11	1.8; 0	13.6; 3/4	9.2; 2/3		–	–	4.4
Sigma Dos/RTVCyL	13–23 Mar 2023	736	?	34.6; 10/11	34.8; 10/11	3.9; 0	12.9; 3/4	10.3; 3		–	1.8; 0	0.2
Sigma Dos/El Mundo	10–16 Mar 2023	609	?	34.9; 10/11	34.5; 10/11	3.8; 0	13.1; 3/4	10.4; 3		–	1.7; 0	0.4
EM-Analytics/Electomanía	15 Nov 2021	?	?	31.0; 9	38.0; 12	4.7; 0		8.3; 2		13.0; 4	–	7.0
2019 municipal election	26 May 2019	—N/a	69.1	35.7; 11	30.1; 9	12.6; 3	10.5; 3	6.3; 1	3.0; 0	–	–	5.6

=== Zamora ===
Polling firm/Commissioner	Fieldwork date	Sample size	Turnout	IU	PP	PSOE	CS	Vox	Podemos	UPL	ZSí	Lead
2023 municipal election	28 May 2023	—N/a	60.0	37.5; 10	28.6; 8	13.2; 3	–	7.9; 2	0.3; 0	1.0; 0	10.0; 2	8.9
Metroscopia/La Opinión	15–16 May 2023	700	60	42.9; 12/13	25.4; 6/7	11.3; 3	–	8.3; 2	–	3.6; 0	6.6; 1/2	17.5
Sigma Dos/RTVCyL	5–11 May 2023	500	?	40.1; 11	27.3; 7	14.5; 4	–	8.0; 2	–	–	6.0; 1	12.8
Sigma Dos/RTVCyL	13–22 Mar 2023	400	?	32.3; 9/10	29.1; 8/9	18.2; 5/6	1.9; 0	8.1; 2	2.6; 0	2.8; 0	3.4; 0	3.2
EM-Analytics/Electomanía	14 May–15 Oct 2021	370	?	50.3; 15	26.3; 7	6.7; 1	3.4; 0	7.6; 2	–	–	–	24.0
2019 municipal election	26 May 2019	—N/a	65.5	48.1; 14	20.5; 6	11.7; 3	8.2; 2	4.4; 0	0.9; 0	0.2; 0	–	27.6
