= Opinion polling for the 2027 Spanish local elections (Castilla–La Mancha) =

In the run up to the 2027 Spanish local elections, various organisations carry out opinion polling to gauge voting intention in local entities in Spain. Results of such polls for municipalities in Castilla–La Mancha are displayed in this article. The date range for these opinion polls is from the previous local elections, held on 28 May 2023, to the day the next elections were held, on 23 May 2027.

Polls are listed in reverse chronological order, showing the most recent first and using the dates when the survey fieldwork was done, as opposed to the date of publication. Where the fieldwork dates are unknown, the date of publication is given instead. The highest percentage figure in each polling survey is displayed with its background shaded in the leading party's colour. If a tie ensues, this is applied to the figures with the highest percentages. The "Lead" columns on the right shows the percentage-point difference between the parties with the highest percentages in a given poll.

== Municipalities ==
=== Alcázar de San Juan ===
Polling firm/Commissioner	Fieldwork date	Sample size	Turnout	PSOE	PP	Vox	VQ	PA	Lead
NC Report/Diario Lanza	10–16 Mar 2026	350	?	40.2; 9	24.8; 6	18.2; 4	11.1; 2	2.5; 0	15.4
2023 municipal election	28 May 2023	—N/a	68.4	42.0; 10	23.5; 5	15.1; 3	12.8; 3	2.6; 0	18.5

=== Ciudad Real ===
Polling firm/Commissioner	Fieldwork date	Sample size	Turnout	PP	PSOE	Vox	CS	Unidas Podemos	Lead
NC Report/Diario Lanza	10–16 Mar 2026	450	?	41.6; 12	32.5; 8	18.0; 5	2.0; 0	3.7; 0	9.1
2023 municipal election	28 May 2023	—N/a	67.6	39.7; 11	34.5; 9	14.4; 4	5.0; 1	4.9; 0	5.2

=== Cuenca ===
Polling firm/Commissioner	Fieldwork date	Sample size	Turnout	PSOE	PP	CNU	Unidas Podemos	Vox	EV	Lead
NC Report	22–30 Oct 2025	500	?	32.5; 9	33.4; 10	9.5; 2	6.5; 1	10.5; 3	3.0; 0	0.9
2023 municipal election	28 May 2023	—N/a	66.2	35.0; 10	31.7; 9	8.4; 2	8.0; 2	8.0; 2	3.6; 0	3.3

=== Guadalajara ===
Polling firm/Commissioner	Fieldwork date	Sample size	Turnout	PSOE	PP	Vox	AIKE	Unidas Podemos	Lead
Idus3/PSOE	4–8 May 2026	700	?	42.6; 12/13	29.0; 7/8	18.9; 4/5	5.8; 0/1	1.8; 0	13.6
2023 municipal election	28 May 2023	—N/a	68.1	40.4; 11	31.5; 9	15.8; 4	5.2; 1	3.4; 0	8.9

=== Puertollano ===
Polling firm/Commissioner	Fieldwork date	Sample size	Turnout	PP	PSOE	Vox	IU	ÍBER	Podemos	Lead
NC Report/Diario Lanza	10–16 Mar 2026	400	?	39.9; 9	32.5; 8	14.1; 3	6.0; 1	3.9; 0	2.3; 0	7.4
2023 municipal election	28 May 2023	—N/a	62.0	41.0; 10	34.0; 8	10.1; 2	6.6; 1	4.0; 0	2.9; 0	7.0

=== Talavera de la Reina ===
Polling firm/Commissioner	Fieldwork date	Sample size	Turnout	PSOE	PP	Vox	Unidas Podemos	NT	Lead
Idus3/PSOE	4–8 May 2026	600	?	46.5; 12/13	31.3; 8/9	14.5; 3/4	3.5; 0	2.2; 0	15.2
2023 municipal election	28 May 2023	—N/a	64.0	44.4; 12	32.1; 9	14.6; 4	3.7; 0	3.0; 0	12.3

=== Toledo ===
Polling firm/Commissioner	Fieldwork date	Sample size	Turnout	PSOE	PP	Vox	Unidas Podemos	PT	Lead
GAD3/PP	24–27 Apr 2026	503	?	35.2; 9/10	37.9; 10/11	14.6; 4	5.8; 1	2.6; 0	2.7
2023 municipal election	28 May 2023	—N/a	70.1	38.8; 11	31.9; 9	13.7; 4	6.3; 1	4.6; 0	6.9

=== Tomelloso ===
Polling firm/Commissioner	Fieldwork date	Sample size	Turnout	PSOE	PP	Vox	Unidas Podemos	Lead
NC Report/Diario Lanza	10–16 Mar 2026	350	?	42.9; 9	39.3; 9	14.6; 3	2.2; 0	3.6
2023 municipal election	28 May 2023	—N/a	64.0	44.7; 10	38.4; 8	13.3; 3	2.6; 0	6.3

=== Valdepeñas ===
Polling firm/Commissioner	Fieldwork date	Sample size	Turnout	PSOE	PP	Vox	Unidas Podemos	Lead
NC Report/Diario Lanza	10–16 Mar 2026	350	?	41.1; 9	30.6; 7	15.6; 3	10.9; 2	10.5
2023 municipal election	28 May 2023	—N/a	62.3	43.2; 10	29.8; 6	13.2; 3	12.0; 2	13.4
