= Opinion polling for the 2019 Spanish local elections (Castilla–La Mancha) =

In the run up to the 2019 Spanish local elections, various organisations carried out opinion polling to gauge voting intention in local entities in Spain. Results of such polls for municipalities in Castilla–La Mancha are displayed in this article. The date range for these opinion polls is from the previous local elections, held on 24 May 2015, to the day the next elections were held, on 26 May 2019.

Polls are listed in reverse chronological order, showing the most recent first and using the dates when the survey fieldwork was done, as opposed to the date of publication. Where the fieldwork dates are unknown, the date of publication is given instead. The highest percentage figure in each polling survey is displayed with its background shaded in the leading party's colour. If a tie ensues, this is applied to the figures with the highest percentages. The "Lead" columns on the right shows the percentage-point difference between the parties with the highest percentages in a given poll.

== Municipalities ==
=== Albacete ===
Color key:

Exit poll

Polling firm/Commissioner	Fieldwork date	Sample size	Turnout	PP	PSOE	Ganemos	Cs	Vox	C	Unidas Podemos	Lead
2019 municipal election	26 May 2019	—N/a	62.2	29.9; 9	31.1; 9	(Note: Within Unidas Podemos.)	18.4; 5	6.6; 1	1.4; 0	10.8; 3	1.2
GfK/FORTA	26 May 2019	?	?	24.4; 6/7	35.0; 9/11		16.2; 4/5	7.4; 1/2	–	11.6; 2/3	10.6
Eyos/Contigo	9–12 May 2018	306	?	? 7	? 4	? 7	? 8	–	? 1	–	?
2015 municipal election	24 May 2015	—N/a	67.3	33.5; 10	27.3; 8	15.3; 5	13.6; 4	0.7; 0	–	–	6.2

=== Alcázar de San Juan ===
Polling firm/Commissioner	Fieldwork date	Sample size	Turnout	PSOE	PP	Equo	IU	Cs	Unidas Podemos	Vox	Lead
2019 municipal election	26 May 2019	—N/a	68.3	46.7; 11	20.5; 4	8.1; 1	5.8; 1	9.0; 2	–	9.0; 2	26.2
SW Demoscopia	27 Dec–4 Jan 2019	375	?	47.8; 10/11	25.2; 6/7	4.4; 0/1		6.7; 1/2	10.3; 1/2	3.6; 0	22.6
Global Market/PSOE	13–20 Mar 2018	370	?	46.2; 10/11	24.8; 5/6	3.8; 0		11.8; 2	13.4; 3	–	21.4
2015 municipal election	24 May 2015	—N/a	73.3	37.6; 9	33.5; 8	14.9; 3	8.3; 1	–	–	–	4.1

=== Almansa ===
Polling firm/Commissioner	Fieldwork date	Sample size	Turnout	PP	PSOE	IU	Cs	Podemos	Unidas Podemos	Lead
2019 municipal election	26 May 2019	—N/a	69.4	41.4; 10	36.1; 8	12.1; 2	5.3; 1	3.6; 0	–	5.3
SW Demoscopia	26–30 Nov 2018	380	?	33.0; 7/8	42.2; 9/10		11.2; 2/3		9.9; 1/2	9.2
2015 municipal election	24 May 2015	—N/a	71.4	44.1; 11	34.9; 8	8.3; 2	3.8; 0	–	–	9.2

=== Alovera ===
Polling firm/Commissioner	Fieldwork date	Sample size	Turnout	Alter	PP	Unidas Podemos	PSOE	Cs	Vox	Lead
2019 municipal election	26 May 2019	—N/a	62.3	28.3; 5	19.2; 3	10.7; 2	21.8; 4	11.1; 2	8.4; 1	6.5
Celeste-Tel	6–9 May 2019	?	66.7	28.8; 6	17.0; 3	12.0; 2	24.3; 5	8.5; 1	4.6; 0	4.5
2015 municipal election	24 May 2015	—N/a	64.7	25.7; 5	23.9; 5	17.3 (Note: Results for Ahora.); 3	14.3; 2	10.7; 2	–	1.8

=== Azuqueca de Henares ===
Polling firm/Commissioner	Fieldwork date	Sample size	Turnout	PSOE	PP	Cs	IU	G	Vox	Podemos	Unidas Podemos	Lead
2019 municipal election	26 May 2019	—N/a	63.5	50.2; 11	12.6; 3	9.9; 2		1.2; 0	11.6; 2		13.6; 3	36.6
Celeste-Tel	6–9 May 2019	?	67.8	44.2; 10	15.4; 4	15.1; 4		4.7; 0	4.7; 0		14.1; 3	28.8
GuadaTV	15 Jan 2019	200	?	24.5; 5/6	16.5; 3	30.5; 7		–	11.5; 2		17.0; 3/4	6.0
2015 municipal election	24 May 2015	—N/a	65.1	41.4; 10	20.6; 4	13.1; 3	13.0; 3	6.2; 1	1.6; 0	–	–	20.8

=== Cabanillas del Campo ===
Polling firm/Commissioner	Fieldwork date	Sample size	Turnout	PP	PSOE	Podemos	IU	Cs	Unidas Podemos	Vox	Lead
2019 municipal election	26 May 2019	—N/a	70.8	26.1; 5	44.4; 8			10.8; 2	9.8; 1	8.1; 1	18.3
Celeste-Tel	6–9 May 2019	?	68.3	30.9; 5	37.4; 7			15.8; 3	10.0; 1	5.9; 1	6.5
2015 municipal election	24 May 2015	—N/a	70.4	36.5; 6	29.0; 4	17.7 (Note: Results for VxC.); 2	9.9; 1	–	–	–	7.5

=== Ciudad Real ===
Color key:

Exit poll

Polling firm/Commissioner	Fieldwork date	Sample size	Turnout	PP	PSOE	Ganemos Ciudad Real–CLM	Cs	Vox	Unidas Podemos	Lead
2019 municipal election	26 May 2019	—N/a	64.6	33.0; 9	38.7; 10		12.5; 3	6.8; 1	7.6; 2	5.7
GfK/FORTA	26 May 2019	?	?	29.9; 7/8	37.8; 9/11		12.1; 2/3	7.1; 1/2	10.6; 2/3	7.9
Global Market/PSOE	19–24 Feb 2018	384	?	30.0; 7/8	39.1; 10/11	13.7; 3	17.3; 4	–	–	9.1
2015 municipal election	24 May 2015	—N/a	66.7	36.8; 10	31.2; 9	15.7; 4	7.5; 2	2.1; 0	–	5.6

=== Cuenca ===
Color key:

Exit poll

Polling firm/Commissioner	Fieldwork date	Sample size	Turnout	PP	PSOE	IU	Cs	Vox	CNU	Podemos	Lead
2019 municipal election	26 May 2019	—N/a	66.7	21.0; 6	36.2; 11	3.3; 0	5.8; 1	3.6; 0	22.4; 6	5.5; 1	13.8
GfK/FORTA	26 May 2019	?	?	22.5; 5/6	38.6; 10/12	5.8; 0/1	7.5; 1/2	3.7; 0/1	11.0; 2/3	7.7; 1/2	16.1
2015 municipal election	24 May 2015	—N/a	68.2	37.3; 10	32.6; 9	12.8; 3	10.3; 3	1.4; 0	–	–	4.7

=== Guadalajara ===
Color key:

Exit poll

Polling firm/Commissioner	Fieldwork date	Sample size	Turnout	PP	PSOE	Unidas Podemos	Cs	Vox	Podemos	AIKE	Lead
2019 municipal election	26 May 2019	—N/a	68.5	31.2; 8	35.2; 10	–	12.2; 3	7.7; 2	7.0; 1	6.1; 1	4.0
GfK/FORTA	26 May 2019	?	?	25.0; 6/7	39.0; 10/12	–	10.1; 2/3	7.5; 1/2	11.4; 2/3	–	14.0
Celeste-Tel	6–9 May 2019	400	72.1	32.5; 9/10	36.9; 10/11	–	9.6; 2	6.2; 1	8.7; 2	2.9; 0	4.4
Celeste-Tel	25 Jan–8 Feb 2019	450	67.6	33.2; 9	31.6; 9	12.3; 3	13.6; 3	5.2; 1	–	–	1.6
GuadaTV	15 Jan 2019	300	?	29.7; 8	28.4; 7/8	9.7; 1/2	21.7; 5/6	10.7; 1/2	–	–	1.3
2015 municipal election	24 May 2015	—N/a	69.3	37.2; 11	28.3; 8	16.8 (Note: Results for Ahora Guadalajara.); 4	9.6; 2	1.5; 0	–	–	8.9

=== Manzanares ===
Polling firm/Commissioner	Fieldwork date	Sample size	Turnout	PSOE	PP	ACM	UPyD	IU	Cs	Podemos	Unidas Podemos	UCIN	Lead
2019 municipal election	26 May 2019	—N/a	69.8	52.7; 11	27.0; 5	3.8; 0	–		4.5; 0		3.5; 0	7.3; 1	25.7
Global Market/PSOE	20–28 Mar 2018	387	?	63.6; 10/11	17.9; 3/4	1.8; 0	–	–	9.1; 2	7.6; 1	–	–	45.7
2015 municipal election	24 May 2015	—N/a	72.1	40.0; 8	33.9; 6	10.0; 1	6.3; 1	5.4; 1	–	–	–	–	6.1

=== Puertollano ===
Color key:

Exit poll

Polling firm/Commissioner	Fieldwork date	Sample size	Turnout	PSOE	PP	IU	Cs	Unidas Podemos	Vox	íber	Lead
2019 municipal election	26 May 2019	—N/a	57.8	42.8; 10	14.8; 3		18.3; 4	10.8; 2	5.6; 1	5.5; 1	24.5
GfK/FORTA	26 May 2019	?	?	47.6; 10/12	14.5; 3/4		14.3; 2/3	13.1; 2/3	5.1; 0/1	4.8; 0/1	33.1
Global Market/PSOE	26 Feb–6 Mar 2018	389	?	40.2; 9	12.1; 2		23.6; 5	24.1; 5	–	–	16.1
2015 municipal election	24 May 2015	—N/a	61.5	40.0; 11	26.1; 7	17.1; 3	10.8; 2	–	–	–	13.9

=== Talavera de la Reina ===
Color key:

Exit poll

Polling firm/Commissioner	Fieldwork date	Sample size	Turnout	PP	PSOE	Ganemos Talavera	Cs	Podemos	Vox	XT	Lead
2019 municipal election	26 May 2019	—N/a	63.2	20.0; 5	46.6; 14	3.0; 0	10.9; 3	4.1; 0	11.9; 3	2.6; 0	26.6
GfK/FORTA	26 May 2019	?	?	17.8; 4/5	40.9; 11/13	5.0; 0/1	10.8; 2/3	8.5; 2/3	12.4; 3/4	3.8; 0/1	23.1
2015 municipal election	24 May 2015	—N/a	64.5	39.5; 11	31.9; 8	14.6; 4	8.7; 2	–	–	–	7.6

=== Toledo ===
Color key:

Exit poll

Polling firm/Commissioner	Fieldwork date	Sample size	Turnout	PP	PSOE	GT	Cs	Vox	Unidas Podemos	Lead
2019 municipal election	26 May 2019	—N/a	69.8	25.5; 6	44.2; 12	0.4; 0	12.6; 3	8.3; 2	8.1; 2	18.7
GfK/FORTA	26 May 2019	?	?	21.3; 5/6	45.2; 11/13	–	11.2; 2/3	9.6; 2/3	11.0; 2/3	23.9
PP	9 Dec 2018	?	?	? 8	? 9	? 4	? 3	? 1	–	?
SyM Consulting/PSOE	9 Apr 2018	?	?	? 7/8	? 11	? 2	? 4/5	–	–	?
2015 municipal election	24 May 2015	—N/a	71.9	32.9; 9	30.2; 9	16.7; 4	10.1; 3	1.8; 0	–	2.7

=== Tomelloso ===
Polling firm/Commissioner	Fieldwork date	Sample size	Turnout	PSOE	PP	Cs	IU	UPyD	Podemos	Vox	Unidas Podemos	Lead
2019 municipal election	26 May 2019	—N/a	61.3	53.7; 12	27.8; 6	5.7; 1		–		8.9; 2	3.1; 0	25.9
Global Market/PSOE	18 Apr 2018	380	?	? 11	? 5	? 3	? 0	? 0	? 2	–	–	?
2015 municipal election	24 May 2015	—N/a	60.8	34.0; 8	33.3; 7	18.5; 4	6.3; 1	5.6; 1	–	–	–	0.7
