= 2023 Spanish local elections in Galicia =

This article presents the results breakdown of the local elections held in Galicia on 28 May 2023. The following tables show detailed results in the autonomous community's most populous municipalities, sorted alphabetically.

== City control ==
The following table lists party control in the most populous municipalities, including provincial capitals (shown in bold). Gains for a party are displayed with the cell's background shaded in that party's colour.

Municipality	Population	Previous control	New control
**A Coruña**	244,700	Socialists' Party of Galicia (PSdeG–PSOE)	Socialists' Party of Galicia (PSdeG–PSOE)
Ferrol	64,158	Socialists' Party of Galicia (PSdeG–PSOE)	People's Party (PP)
**Lugo**	97,211	Socialists' Party of Galicia (PSdeG–PSOE)	Socialists' Party of Galicia (PSdeG–PSOE)
**Ourense**	103,756	Ourensan Democracy (DO)	Ourensan Democracy (DO)
**Pontevedra**	82,828	Galician Nationalist Bloc (BNG)	Galician Nationalist Bloc (BNG)
Santiago de Compostela	98,179	Socialists' Party of Galicia (PSdeG–PSOE)	Galician Nationalist Bloc (BNG)
Vigo	292,374	Socialists' Party of Galicia (PSdeG–PSOE)	Socialists' Party of Galicia (PSdeG–PSOE)

== Municipalities ==
=== A Coruña ===
Population: 244,700

← Summary of the 28 May 2023 City Council of A Coruña election results →
Parties and alliances	Popular vote			Seats	
Parties and alliances	Votes	%	±pp	Total	+/-
People's Party (PP)	42,201	36.54	+6.19	12	+3
Socialists' Party of Galicia (PSdeG–PSOE)	36,216	31.36	+1.34	11	+2
Galician Nationalist Bloc (BNG)	15,770	13.65	+6.49	4	+2
Atlantic Tide (Marea)	5,628	4.87	−15.36	0	−6
For Coruña (We Can–United Left) (Podemos–EU–AV)	4,805	4.16	New	0	±0
Vox (Vox)	4,526	3.92	+1.80	0	±0
Neighbours' Alternative (AV)	2,547	2.21	−0.12	0	±0
Animalist Party with the Environment (PACMA)^{1}	1,055	0.91	+0.12	0	±0
Citizens–Party of the Citizenry (CS)	476	0.41	−5.39	0	−1
Blank Seats to Leave Empty Seats (EB)	407	0.35	New	0	±0
Local Unity (Unidade Local)	223	0.19	New	0	±0
Blank ballots	1,635	1.42	+0.77		
Total	115,489			27	±0
Valid votes	115,489	99.06	−0.51		
Invalid votes	1,093	0.94	+0.51		
Votes cast / turnout	116,582	58.98	−3.78		
Abstentions	81,089	41.02	+3.78		
Registered voters	197,671				
Sources
Footnotes: ^{1} Animalist Party with the Environment results are compared to Animalist Party Against Mistreatment of Animals totals in the 2019 election.

=== Ferrol ===
Population: 64,158

← Summary of the 28 May 2023 City Council of Ferrol election results →
Parties and alliances	Popular vote			Seats	
Parties and alliances	Votes	%	±pp	Total	+/-
People's Party (PP)	13,676	45.29	+3.95	13	+1
Socialists' Party of Galicia (PSdeG–PSOE)	8,268	27.38	−2.10	7	−1
Galician Nationalist Bloc (BNG)	3,226	10.68	+3.30	3	+1
Ferrol in Common (FeC)	2,906	9.62	−1.09	2	−1
Vox (Vox)	896	2.97	+1.95	0	±0
We Can–Green Alliance (Podemos–AV)	500	1.66	New	0	±0
Linking (LGD)	138	0.46	+0.03	0	±0
Democratic Centre Coalition (CCD)	94	0.31	−0.68	0	±0
Blank ballots	493	1.63	+0.71		
Total	30,197			25	±0
Valid votes	30,197	98.97	−0.47		
Invalid votes	314	1.03	+0.47		
Votes cast / turnout	30,511	56.59	−4.55		
Abstentions	23,408	43.41	+4.55		
Registered voters	53,919				

=== Lugo ===
Population: 97,211

← Summary of the 28 May 2023 City Council of Lugo election results →
Parties and alliances	Popular vote			Seats	
Parties and alliances	Votes	%	±pp	Total	+/−
People's Party (PP)	21,459	43.59	+11.15	12	+2
Socialists' Party of Galicia (PSdeG–PSOE)	13,641	27.71	+1.26	8	±0
Galician Nationalist Bloc (BNG)	9,810	19.93	+3.57	5	±0
Citizens–Party of the Citizenry (CS)	1,349	2.74	−5.57	0	−2
Vox (Vox)	1,141	2.32	+0.27	0	±0
We Can–United Left (Podemos–EU–AV)^{1}	713	1.45	−6.74	0	±0
We Count–Galicia Always–Galician Party (Contamos–GaS–GLG)	389	0.79	New	0	±0
Union of Independent Citizens (UCIN)	160	0.33	New	0	±0
Blank ballots	568	1.15	+0.12		
Total	49,230			25	±0
Valid votes	49,230	98.70	−0.39		
Invalid votes	647	1.30	+0.39		
Votes cast / turnout	49,877	64.30	+2.86		
Abstentions	27,692	35.70	−2.86		
Registered voters	77,569				
Sources
Footnotes: ^{1} We Can–United Left results are compared to the combined totals of We Can and Citizen Left Alternative–Equo in the 2019 election.

=== Ourense ===
Population: 103,756

← Summary of the 28 May 2023 City Council of Ourense election results →
Parties and alliances	Popular vote			Seats	
Parties and alliances	Votes	%	±pp	Total	+/−
Ourensan Democracy (DO)	18,388	33.72	+12.19	10	+3
People's Party (PP)	13,609	24.96	+2.41	7	±0
Socialists' Party of Galicia (PSdeG–PSOE)	10,514	19.28	−7.08	6	−3
Galician Nationalist Bloc (BNG)	8,576	15.73	+9.48	4	+2
Vox (Vox)	1,004	1.84	+0.53	0	±0
We Can–Better Ourense–United Left–Equo–Green Alliance (Podemos–EU)^{1}	784	1.44	−3.17	0	±0
With You, We Are Democracy (Contigo)	281	0.52	New	0	±0
Citizens–Party of the Citizenry (CS)	233	0.43	−8.29	0	−2
Democratic Centre Coalition (CCD)	229	0.42	New	0	±0
Living Ourense (VOU)	126	0.23	−1.64	0	±0
Blank ballots	785	1.44	+0.65		
Total	54,529			27	±0
Valid votes	54,529	98.80	−0.55		
Invalid votes	663	1.20	+0.55		
Votes cast / turnout	55,192	65.78	+0.96		
Abstentions	28,713	34.22	−0.96		
Registered voters	83,905				
Sources
Footnotes: ^{1} We Can–Better Ourense–United Left–Equo–Green Alliance results are compared to the combined totals of United We Can–United Left and Better Ourense–Local Tides in the 2019 election.

=== Pontevedra ===
Population: 82,828

← Summary of the 28 May 2023 City Council of Pontevedra election results →
Parties and alliances	Popular vote			Seats	
Parties and alliances	Votes	%	±pp	Total	+/−
People's Party (PP)	16,117	38.88	+8.88	11	+2
Galician Nationalist Bloc (BNG)	13,004	31.37	−8.42	9	−2
Socialists' Party of Galicia (PSdeG–PSOE)	7,354	17.74	+3.76	5	+1
Vox (Vox)	1,451	3.50	+1.03	0	±0
Alternative Pontevedra (POAL)^{1}	954	2.30	−1.30	0	±0
Common Space (EsCo)	585	1.41	New	0	±0
We Can–Green Alliance (Podemos–AV)^{2}	581	1.40	−1.64	0	±0
Animalist Party with the Environment (PACMA)	479	1.16	New	0	±0
Citizens–Party of the Citizenry (CS)	395	0.95	−4.22	0	−1
Blank ballots	536	1.29	+0.07		
Total	41,456			25	±0
Valid votes	41,456	98.83	−0.36		
Invalid votes	490	1.17	+0.36		
Votes cast / turnout	41,946	62.96	+0.50		
Abstentions	24,673	37.04	−0.50		
Registered voters	66,619				
Sources
Footnotes: ^{1} Alternative Pontevedra results are compared to Pontevedra Tide–Local Tides totals in the 2019 election.; ^{2} We Can–Green Alliance results are compared to We Can–United Left, Son in Common totals in the 2019 election.

=== Santiago de Compostela ===
Population: 98,179

← Summary of the 28 May 2023 City Council of Santiago de Compostela election results →
Parties and alliances	Popular vote			Seats	
Parties and alliances	Votes	%	±pp	Total	+/-
People's Party (PP)	18,295	37.70	+8.52	11	+3
Galician Nationalist Bloc (BNG)	11,430	23.55	+14.24	6	+4
Socialists' Party of Galicia (PSdeG–PSOE)	10,513	21.66	−13.04	6	−4
Open Compostela (CA)	4,446	9.16	−11.20	2	−3
Vox (Vox)	1,652	3.40	+2.28	0	±0
By and for Santiago (Por e para Santiago)	1,023	2.11	New	0	±0
Galician Party (PG)	291	0.60	New	0	±0
Commitment to Galicia (CxG)	138	0.28	−1.12	0	±0
Blank ballots	740	1.52	+0.76		
Total	48,528			25	±0
Valid votes	48,528	98.93	−0.51		
Invalid votes	525	1.07	+0.51		
Votes cast / turnout	49,053	61.86	−4.81		
Abstentions	30,248	38.14	+4.81		
Registered voters	79,301				

=== Vigo ===
Population: 292,374

← Summary of the 28 May 2023 City Council of Vigo election results →
Parties and alliances	Popular vote			Seats	
Parties and alliances	Votes	%	±pp	Total	+/-
Socialists' Party of Galicia (PSdeG–PSOE)	82,313	60.86	−6.77	19	−1
People's Party (PP)	25,142	18.59	+4.90	5	+1
Galician Nationalist Bloc (BNG)	15,008	11.10	+5.44	3	+2
We Can–Tide of Vigo–United Left–Equo–Green Alliance (Podemos–MdV)^{1}	6,523	4.82	−2.13	0	2
Vox (Vox)	3,573	2.64	+1.34	0	±0
Citizens–Party of the Citizenry (CS)	687	0.51	−1.92	0	±0
Communist Party of the Workers of Galicia (PCTG)	481	0.36	+0.18	0	±0
Blank ballots	1,512	1.12	+0.20		
Total	135,239			27	±0
Valid votes	135,239	99.09	−0.46		
Invalid votes	1,240	0.91	+0.46		
Votes cast / turnout	136,479	57.53	−5.22		
Abstentions	100,766	42.47	+5.22		
Registered voters	237,245				
Sources
Footnotes: ^{1} We Can–Tide of Vigo–United Left–Equo–Green Alliance results are compared to Tide of Vigo–Son in Common totals in the 2019 election.
