= 2023 Spanish local elections in Castile and León =

This article presents the results breakdown of the local elections held in Castile and León on 28 May 2023. The following tables show detailed results in the autonomous community's most populous municipalities, sorted alphabetically.

== City control ==
The following table lists party control in the most populous municipalities, including provincial capitals (shown in bold). Gains for a party are displayed with the cell's background shaded in that party's colour.

Municipality	Population	Previous control	New control
**Ávila**	57,730	For Ávila (XAV)	For Ávila (XAV)
**Burgos**	173,483	Spanish Socialist Workers' Party (PSOE)	People's Party (PP)
**León**	120,951	Spanish Socialist Workers' Party (PSOE)	Spanish Socialist Workers' Party (PSOE)
**Palencia**	76,302	Citizens–Party of the Citizenry (Cs)	Spanish Socialist Workers' Party (PSOE)
Ponferrada	63,052	Spanish Socialist Workers' Party (PSOE)	People's Party (PP)
**Salamanca**	142,412	People's Party (PP)	People's Party (PP)
**Segovia**	50,802	Spanish Socialist Workers' Party (PSOE)	People's Party (PP)
**Soria**	39,450	Spanish Socialist Workers' Party (PSOE)	Spanish Socialist Workers' Party (PSOE)
**Valladolid**	295,639	Spanish Socialist Workers' Party (PSOE)	People's Party (PP)
**Zamora**	59,475	United Left (IU)	United Left (IU)

== Municipalities ==
=== Ávila ===
Population: 57,730

← Summary of the 28 May 2023 City Council of Ávila election results →
Parties and alliances	Popular vote			Seats	
Parties and alliances	Votes	%	±pp	Total	+/−
For Ávila (XAV)	11,075	38.37	+3.23	11	±0
People's Party (PP)	7,525	26.07	+4.51	7	+1
Spanish Socialist Workers' Party (PSOE)	4,459	15.45	−3.89	4	−2
Vox (Vox)	2,869	9.94	+5.51	3	+3
United Left–We Can (IU–Podemos)^{1}	1,398	4.84	+0.50	0	±0
Citizens–Party of the Citizenry (CS)	654	2.27	−6.23	0	−2
Our Land Party (PNTAV)	536	1.86	New	0	±0
Blank ballots	344	1.19	+0.56		
Total	28,860			25	±0
Valid votes	28,860	98.67	−0.65		
Invalid votes	388	1.33	+0.65		
Votes cast / turnout	29,248	65.23	−6.26		
Abstentions	15,588	34.77	+6.26		
Registered voters	44,836				
Sources
Footnotes: ^{1} United Left–We Can results are compared to the combined totals of United Left–Equo and We Can in the 2019 election.

=== Burgos ===
Population: 173,483

← Summary of the 28 May 2023 City Council of Burgos election results →
Parties and alliances	Popular vote			Seats	
Parties and alliances	Votes	%	±pp	Total	+/−
Spanish Socialist Workers' Party (PSOE)	29,651	35.02	−1.18	12	+1
People's Party (PP)	27,579	32.57	+6.64	11	+4
Vox (Vox)	10,790	12.74	+5.57	4	+2
We Can–United Left–Green Alliance (Podemos–IU–AV)^{1}	4,198	4.96	−6.36	0	−2
Decide Burgos (DCD)	3,365	3.97	New	0	±0
Burgalese Way (VB)	2,393	2.83	New	0	±0
Citizens–Party of the Citizenry (CS)	1,958	2.31	−14.57	0	−5
Empty Spain–Castilian Party–Commoners' Land (EV–PCAS–TC)	1,092	1.29	New	0	±0
Seniors in Action (3e)	1,063	1.26	New	0	±0
Greens Equo (Equo)	576	0.68	New	0	±0
Blank Seats to Leave Empty Seats (EB)	293	0.35	New	0	±0
Communist Party of the Workers of Spain (PCTE)	239	0.28	New	0	±0
Federation Free Socialist Party (PSLF)	211	0.25	New	0	±0
Blank ballots	1,266	1.50	+0.36		
Total	84,674			27	±0
Valid votes	84,674	98.51	−0.65		
Invalid votes	1,281	1.49	+0.65		
Votes cast / turnout	85,955	63.71	−3.43		
Abstentions	48,961	36.29	+3.43		
Registered voters	134,916				
Sources
Footnotes: ^{1} We Can–United Left–Green Alliance results are compared to the combined totals of We Can and Imagine Burgos in the 2019 election.

=== León ===
Population: 120,951

← Summary of the 28 May 2023 City Council of León election results →
Parties and alliances	Popular vote			Seats	
Parties and alliances	Votes	%	±pp	Total	+/−
Spanish Socialist Workers' Party (PSOE)	20,557	35.25	+3.18	11	+1
People's Party (PP)	16,939	29.05	−0.56	9	±0
Leonese People's Union (UPL)	11,138	19.10	+9.68	5	+2
Vox (Vox)	5,208	8.93	+3.97	2	+2
We Can–United Left (Podemos–IU)^{1}	2,010	3.45	−4.24	0	−1
Citizens–Party of the Citizenry (CS)	1,057	1.81	−12.17	0	−4
Forward–Greens Equo (Alantre–Equo)	315	0.54	New	0	±0
Communist Party of the Workers of Spain (PCTE)	210	0.36	+0.18	0	±0
Regionalist Party of the Leonese Country (PREPAL)	155	0.27	+0.02	0	±0
Spanish Phalanx of the CNSO (FE de las JONS)	36	0.06	New	0	±0
Blank ballots	692	1.19	+0.19		
Total	58,317			27	±0
Valid votes	58,317	97.62	−1.60		
Invalid votes	1,423	2.38	+1.60		
Votes cast / turnout	59,740	60.63	−3.34		
Abstentions	38,788	39.37	+3.34		
Registered voters	98,528				
Sources
Footnotes: ^{1} We Can–United Left results are compared to the combined totals of We Can–Equo and United Left in the 2019 election.

=== Palencia ===
Population: 76,302

← Summary of the 28 May 2023 City Council of Palencia election results →
Parties and alliances	Popular vote			Seats	
Parties and alliances	Votes	%	±pp	Total	+/−
Spanish Socialist Workers' Party (PSOE)	14,487	36.84	−1.02	10	−1
People's Party (PP)	12,382	31.49	−1.87	8	−1
Vox (Vox)	4,361	11.09	+4.98	3	+2
Let's Go Palencia (VP)	4,177	10.62	New	3	+3
United Left–We Can (IU–Podemos)^{1}	2,029	5.16	−3.75	1	±0
Citizens–Party of the Citizenry (CS)	1,243	3.16	−8.77	0	−3
For a Fairer World (PUM+J)	203	0.52	New	0	±0
Blank ballots	443	1.13	+0.15		
Total	39,325			25	±0
Valid votes	39,325	98.77	−0.40		
Invalid votes	491	1.23	+0.40		
Votes cast / turnout	39,816	64.34	−3.42		
Abstentions	22,072	35.66	+3.42		
Registered voters	61,888				
Sources
Footnotes: ^{1} We Can–United Left results are compared to the combined totals of Citizen Platform: Let's Win Palencia and We Can–Equo in the 2019 election.

=== Ponferrada ===
Population: 63,052

← Summary of the 28 May 2023 City Council of Ponferrada election results →
Parties and alliances	Popular vote			Seats	
Parties and alliances	Votes	%	±pp	Total	+/−
Spanish Socialist Workers' Party (PSOE)	10,106	33.70	+1.57	11	+2
People's Party (PP)	9,238	30.81	+7.87	10	+4
Coalition for El Bierzo (CB)	2,588	8.63	−0.59	2	±0
Vox (Vox)	2,205	7.35	New	2	+2
We Can–Green Alliance (Podemos–AV)	1,440	4.80	−2.32	0	−2
Regionalist Party of El Bierzo (PRB)	1,415	4.72	−2.60	0	−2
Leonese People's Union (UPL)	1,396	4.66	New	0	±0
Ponferrada With You (PC)^{1}	408	1.36	−1.02	0	±0
Federation Free Socialist Party (PSLF)	374	1.25	New	0	±0
Bierzo Now (Bierzo Ya)	177	0.59	New	0	±0
Grouped Independent Neighbours (VIAs)	175	0.58	−0.17	0	±0
Democratic Illusion (ID)	29	0.10	New	0	±0
Citizens–Party of the Citizenry (CS)	n/a	n/a	−8.21	0	−2
Social Unity of Bierzo Electors (USE Bierzo)	n/a	n/a	−7.87	0	−2
Blank ballots	436	1.45	+0.44		
Total	29,987			25	±0
Valid votes	29,987	98.34	−0.73		
Invalid votes	505	1.66	+0.73		
Votes cast / turnout	30,492	58.72	−2.58		
Abstentions	21,439	41.28	+2.58		
Registered voters	51,931				
Sources
Footnotes: ^{1} Ponferrada With You results are compared to United Left totals in the 2019 election.

=== Salamanca ===
Population: 142,412

← Summary of the 28 May 2023 City Council of Salamanca election results →
Parties and alliances	Popular vote			Seats	
Parties and alliances	Votes	%	±pp	Total	+/−
People's Party (PP)	30,273	43.92	+7.84	14	+3
Spanish Socialist Workers' Party (PSOE)	20,771	30.14	−3.85	10	±0
Vox (Vox)	7,587	11.01	+6.46	3	+3
We Can–United Left–Green Alliance (Podemos–IU–AV)	3,332	4.83	−2.81	0	−2
Citizens–Party of the Citizenry (CS)	2,464	3.58	−11.90	0	−4
Salamanca on the Move–Empty Spain (SMS–EV)	925	1.34	New	0	±0
For Salamanca (Por Salamanca)	746	1.08	New	0	±0
Brave Salamanca (Salamanca Valiente)	579	0.84	New	0	±0
Leonese People's Union (UPL)	477	0.69	+0.50	0	±0
Salamanca Matters (Salamanca Sí)	318	0.46	New	0	±0
With You, We Are Democracy (Contigo)	230	0.33	−0.62	0	±0
Communist Party of the Workers of Spain (PCTE)	144	0.21	+0.05	0	±0
Regionalist Party of the Leonese Country (PREPAL)	121	0.18	+0.01	0	±0
Blank ballots	953	1.38	+0.59		
Total	68,920			27	±0
Valid votes	68,920	98.87	−0.39		
Invalid votes	787	1.13	+0.39		
Votes cast / turnout	69,707	60.43	−2.94		
Abstentions	45,643	39.57	+2.94		
Registered voters	115,350				

=== Segovia ===
Population: 50,802

← Summary of the 28 May 2023 City Council of Segovia election results →
Parties and alliances	Popular vote			Seats	
Parties and alliances	Votes	%	±pp	Total	+/−
People's Party (PP)	11,071	44.58	+13.10	12	+3
Spanish Socialist Workers' Party (PSOE)	6,636	26.72	−6.57	7	−3
Vox (Vox)	2,203	8.87	+4.04	2	+2
United Left (IU)	1,904	7.67	+0.28	2	±0
We Can–Green Alliance (Podemos–AV)	1,362	5.48	+0.28	1	±0
Citizens–Party of the Citizenry (CS)	1,341	5.40	−7.83	1	−2
Blank ballots	318	1.28	+0.49		
Total	24,835			25	±0
Valid votes	24,835	98.57	−0.60		
Invalid votes	361	1.43	+0.60		
Votes cast / turnout	25,196	65.99	−2.45		
Abstentions	12,986	34.01	+2.45		
Registered voters	38,182				

=== Soria ===
Population: 39,450

← Summary of the 28 May 2023 City Council of Soria election results →
Parties and alliances	Popular vote			Seats	
Parties and alliances	Votes	%	±pp	Total	+/−
Spanish Socialist Workers' Party (PSOE)	8,453	48.54	−0.98	12	±0
People's Party (PP)	5,253	30.17	+7.02	7	+1
Vox (Vox)	1,413	8.11	+4.20	2	+2
We Can–Green Alliance (Podemos–AV)	807	4.63	−1.54	0	−1
United Left (IU)^{1}	659	3.78	−0.16	0	±0
Citizens–Party of the Citizenry (CS)	384	2.21	−6.26	0	−2
Together for Spain (JxE)	91	0.52	New	0	±0
Blank ballots	354	2.03	+0.70		
Total	17,414			21	±0
Valid votes	17,414	98.40	−0.58		
Invalid votes	284	1.60	+0.58		
Votes cast / turnout	17,698	59.63	−3.40		
Abstentions	11,982	40.37	+3.40		
Registered voters	29,680				
Sources
Footnotes: ^{1} United Left results are compared to Soria in Common totals in the 2019 election.

=== Valladolid ===
Population: 295,639

← Summary of the 28 May 2023 City Council of Valladolid election results →
Parties and alliances	Popular vote			Seats	
Parties and alliances	Votes	%	±pp	Total	+/−
Spanish Socialist Workers' Party (PSOE)	58,901	36.70	+1.02	11	±0
People's Party (PP)	58,142	36.23	+6.15	11	+2
Vox (Vox)	18,738	11.67	+5.32	3	+2
Valladolid Takes the Floor (TLP)^{1}	14,448	9.00	−4.46	2	−1
Citizens–Party of the Citizenry (CS)	3,226	2.01	−10.58	0	−3
With You We Advance (Contigo Avanzamos)	2,794	1.74	New	0	±0
Animalist Party with the Environment (PACMA)^{2}	737	0.46	−0.03	0	±0
Empty Spain (España Vaciada)	391	0.24	New	0	±0
Blank Seats to Leave Empty Seats (EB)	270	0.17	New	0	±0
Communist Party of the Workers of Spain (PCTE)	253	0.16	+0.02	0	±0
Seniors in Action (3e)	219	0.14	New	0	±0
For a Fairer World (PUM+J)	174	0.11	New	0	±0
Castilian Party–Commoners' Land (PCAS–TC)	156	0.10	−0.05	0	±0
Spanish Phalanx of the CNSO (FE de las JONS)	145	0.09	+0.02	0	±0
Castilian Unity (UdCa)	112	0.07	New	0	±0
Civic Force (Fuerza Cívica)	72	0.04	New	0	±0
Decide Now (Ahora Decide)	70	0.04	New	0	±0
Blank ballots	1,653	1.03	+0.36		
Total	160,501			27	±0
Valid votes	160,501	99.18	−0.28		
Invalid votes	1,319	0.82	+0.28		
Votes cast / turnout	161,820	67.24	−1.88		
Abstentions	78,831	32.76	+1.88		
Registered voters	240,651				
Sources
Footnotes: ^{1} Valladolid Takes the Floor results are compared to the combined totals of Valladolid Takes the Floor and We Can in the 2019 election.; ^{2} Animalist Party with the Environment results are compared to Animalist Party Against Mistreatment of Animals totals in the 2019 election.

=== Zamora ===
Population: 59,475

← Summary of the 28 May 2023 City Council of Zamora election results →
Parties and alliances	Popular vote			Seats	
Parties and alliances	Votes	%	±pp	Total	+/−
United Left (IU)	11,029	37.54	−10.54	10	−4
People's Party (PP)	8,407	28.61	+8.12	8	+2
Spanish Socialist Workers' Party (PSOE)	3,872	13.18	+1.44	3	±0
Zamora Yes (ZSí)	2,930	9.97	New	2	+2
Vox (Vox)	2,329	7.93	+3.49	2	+2
Leonese People's Union (UPL)	285	0.97	+0.74	0	±0
Future (F)	87	0.30	New	0	±0
We Can–Green Alliance (Podemos–AV)	79	0.27	−0.66	0	±0
Regionalist Party of the Leonese Country (PREPAL)	73	0.25	+0.15	0	±0
Citizens–Party of the Citizenry (CS)	n/a	n/a	−8.17	0	−2
Blank ballots	289	0.98	+0.19		
Total	29,380			25	±0
Valid votes	29,380	99.23	−0.16		
Invalid votes	229	0.77	+0.16		
Votes cast / turnout	29,609	59.99	−5.50		
Abstentions	19,744	40.01	+5.50		
Registered voters	49,353				
