= 2023 Spanish local elections in Castilla–La Mancha =

This article presents the results breakdown of the local elections held in Castilla–La Mancha on 28 May 2023. The following tables show detailed results in the autonomous community's most populous municipalities, sorted alphabetically.

== City control ==
The following table lists party control in the most populous municipalities, including provincial capitals (shown in bold). Gains for a party are displayed with the cell's background shaded in that party's colour.

Municipality	Population	Previous control	New control
**Albacete**	172,357	Spanish Socialist Workers' Party (PSOE)	People's Party (PP)
**Ciudad Real**	74,850	Spanish Socialist Workers' Party (PSOE)	People's Party (PP)
**Cuenca**	53,389	Spanish Socialist Workers' Party (PSOE)	Spanish Socialist Workers' Party (PSOE)
**Guadalajara**	87,452	Spanish Socialist Workers' Party (PSOE)	People's Party (PP)
Talavera de la Reina	83,247	Spanish Socialist Workers' Party (PSOE)	People's Party (PP)
**Toledo**	85,085	Spanish Socialist Workers' Party (PSOE)	People's Party (PP)

== Municipalities ==
=== Albacete ===
Population: 172,357

← Summary of the 28 May 2023 City Council of Albacete election results →
Parties and alliances	Popular vote			Seats	
Parties and alliances	Votes	%	±pp	Total	+/−
People's Party (PP)	33,343	38.19	+8.26	**12**	+3
Spanish Socialist Workers' Party (PSOE)	29,677	33.99	+2.90	**10**	+1
Vox (Vox)	13,440	15.39	+8.80	**4**	+3
United We Can–United Left (Unidas–Podemos–IU)	5,242	6.00	−4.82	**1**	−2
Citizens–Party of the Citizenry (CS)	2,928	3.35	−15.00	0	−5
Union of Independent Citizens (UCIN)	566	0.65	+0.38	0	±0
Your Fatherland (TÚpatria)	362	0.41	New	0	±0
Social Union of Democratic Centre (UNISO)	239	0.27	New	0	±0
Blank ballots	1,518	1.74	+0.88		
**Total**	**87,315**			**27**	**±0**
Valid votes	87,315	98.61	−0.69		
Invalid votes	1,230	1.39	+0.69		
**Votes cast / turnout**	**88,545**	**66.15**	**+3.97**		
Abstentions	45,314	33.85	−3.97		
**Registered voters**	**133,859**				

=== Ciudad Real ===
Population: 74,850

← Summary of the 28 May 2023 City Council of Ciudad Real election results →
Parties and alliances	Popular vote			Seats	
Parties and alliances	Votes	%	±pp	Total	+/−
People's Party (PP)	15,555	39.71	+6.70	**11**	+2
Spanish Socialist Workers' Party (PSOE)	13,516	34.51	−4.17	**9**	−1
Vox (Vox)	5,650	14.43	+7.61	**4**	+3
Citizens–Party of the Citizenry (CS)	1,975	5.04	−7.48	**1**	−2
United–United Left–We Can (Unidas–IU–Podemos)	1,903	4.86	−2.78	0	−2
Blank ballots	569	1.45	+0.53		
**Total**	**39,168**			**25**	**±0**
Valid votes	39,168	98.81	−0.40		
Invalid votes	470	1.19	+0.40		
**Votes cast / turnout**	**39,638**	**67.56**	**+2.95**		
Abstentions	19,029	32.44	−2.95		
**Registered voters**	**58,667**				

=== Cuenca ===
Population: 53,389

← Summary of the 28 May 2023 City Council of Cuenca election results →
Parties and alliances	Popular vote			Seats	
Parties and alliances	Votes	%	±pp	Total	+/−
Spanish Socialist Workers' Party (PSOE)	9,295	34.95	−1.24	**10**	−1
People's Party (PP)	8,435	31.72	+10.75	**9**	+3
Cuenca Unites Us (CNU)	2,244	8.44	−13.98	**2**	−4
Cuenca on the Move–United for Cuenca (Podemos–IU)^{1}	2,124	7.99	−0.77	**2**	+1
Vox (Vox)	2,117	7.96	+4.34	**2**	+2
+CUENCA Now–Empty Spain (+CU–EV)	962	3.62	New	0	±0
Your Fatherland (TÚpatria)	495	1.86	New	0	±0
Citizens–Party of the Citizenry (CS)	483	1.82	−3.95	0	−1
Blank ballots	440	1.65	+0.76		
**Total**	**26,595**			**25**	**±0**
Valid votes	26,595	98.71	−0.66		
Invalid votes	347	1.29	+0.66		
**Votes cast / turnout**	**26,942**	**66.22**	**−0.48**		
Abstentions	13,744	33.78	+0.48		
**Registered voters**	**40,686**				
Sources
Footnotes: ^{1} Cuenca on the Move–United for Cuenca results are compared to the combined totals of We Can–Equo (Cuenca on the Move!) and United Left–Castilian Party–Commoners' Land in the 2019 election.

=== Guadalajara ===
Population: 87,452

← Summary of the 28 May 2023 City Council of Guadalajara election results →
Parties and alliances	Popular vote			Seats	
Parties and alliances	Votes	%	±pp	Total	+/−
Spanish Socialist Workers' Party (PSOE)	16,877	40.37	+5.18	**11**	+1
People's Party (PP)	13,169	31.50	+0.29	**9**	+1
Vox (Vox)	6,600	15.79	+8.13	**4**	+2
Guadalajara Must Be Cherished (AIKE)	2,185	5.23	−0.90	**1**	±0
United We Can–United Left–Green Alliance (Podemos–IU–AV)^{1}	1,401	3.35	−3.64	0	−1
Citizens–Party of the Citizenry (CS)	743	1.78	−10.38	0	−3
Animalist Party with the Environment (PACMA)	304	0.73	New	0	±0
Blank ballots	528	1.26	+0.61		
**Total**	**41,808**			**25**	**±0**
Valid votes	41,808	98.75	−0.52		
Invalid votes	529	1.25	+0.52		
**Votes cast / turnout**	**42,337**	**68.07**	**−0.39**		
Abstentions	19,859	31.93	+0.39		
**Registered voters**	**62,196**				
Sources
Footnotes: ^{1} United We Can–United Left–Green Alliance results are compared to We Can–Equo totals in the 2019 election.

=== Talavera de la Reina ===
Population: 83,247

← Summary of the 28 May 2023 City Council of Talavera de la Reina election results →
Parties and alliances	Popular vote			Seats	
Parties and alliances	Votes	%	±pp	Total	+/−
Spanish Socialist Workers' Party (PSOE)	17,508	44.39	−2.24	**12**	−2
People's Party (PP)	12,656	32.09	+12.12	**9**	+4
Vox (Vox)	5,752	14.59	+2.68	**4**	+1
United for Talavera–United Left–We Can (Unidas–IU–Podemos)	1,470	3.73	−0.37	0	±0
We Talavera–Empty Spain (NT–EV)	1,165	2.95	New	0	±0
Here Now (Aquí Ahora)	349	0.88	New	0	±0
Citizens–Party of the Citizenry (CS)	n/a	n/a	−10.91	0	−3
Blank ballots	537	1.36	+0.46		
**Total**	**39,437**			**25**	**±0**
Valid votes	39,437	98.59	−0.51		
Invalid votes	565	1.41	+0.51		
**Votes cast / turnout**	**40,002**	**64.04**	**+0.86**		
Abstentions	22,463	35.96	−0.86		
**Registered voters**	**62,465**				

=== Toledo ===
Population: 85,085

← Summary of the 28 May 2023 City Council of Toledo election results →
Parties and alliances	Popular vote			Seats	
Parties and alliances	Votes	%	±pp	Total	+/−
Spanish Socialist Workers' Party (PSOE)	16,892	38.79	−5.44	**11**	−1
People's Party (PP)	13,873	31.86	+6.41	**9**	+3
Vox (Vox)	5,958	13.68	+5.38	**4**	+2
United–United Left–We Can (Unidas–IU–Podemos)	2,746	6.31	−1.78	**1**	−1
Toledo First Electors' Group (Primero Toledo)	1,986	4.56	New	0	±0
Citizens–Party of the Citizenry (CS)	1,432	3.29	−9.26	0	−3
Spanish Phalanx of the CNSO (FE de las JONS)	66	0.15	+0.06	0	±0
Blank ballots	596	1.37	+0.49		
**Total**	**43,549**			**25**	**±0**
Valid votes	43,549	98.60	−0.61		
Invalid votes	619	1.40	+0.61		
**Votes cast / turnout**	**44,168**	**70.08**	**+0.32**		
Abstentions	18,860	29.92	−0.32		
**Registered voters**	**63,028**				

== See also ==
- 2023 Castilian-Manchegan regional election
