= 2019 Spanish local elections in Castilla–La Mancha =

This article presents the results breakdown of the local elections held in Castilla–La Mancha on 26 May 2019. The following tables show detailed results in the autonomous community's most populous municipalities, sorted alphabetically.

== City control ==
The following table lists party control in the most populous municipalities, including provincial capitals (shown in bold). Gains for a party are displayed with the cell's background shaded in that party's colour.

Municipality	Population	Previous control	New control
**Albacete**	173,050	People's Party (PP)	Citizens–Party of the Citizenry (Cs) (PSOE in 2021)
**Ciudad Real**	74,743	Spanish Socialist Workers' Party (PSOE)	Spanish Socialist Workers' Party (PSOE)
**Cuenca**	54,898	People's Party (PP)	Spanish Socialist Workers' Party (PSOE)
**Guadalajara**	84,910	People's Party (PP)	Spanish Socialist Workers' Party (PSOE)
Talavera de la Reina	83,009	People's Party (PP)	Spanish Socialist Workers' Party (PSOE)
**Toledo**	84,282	Spanish Socialist Workers' Party (PSOE)	Spanish Socialist Workers' Party (PSOE)

== Municipalities ==
=== Albacete ===
Population: 173,050

← Summary of the 26 May 2019 City Council of Albacete election results →
Parties and alliances	Popular vote			Seats	
Parties and alliances	Votes	%	±pp	Total	+/−
Spanish Socialist Workers' Party (PSOE)	25,763	31.09	+3.78	**9**	+1
People's Party (PP)	24,799	29.93	−3.55	**9**	−1
Citizens–Party of the Citizenry (Cs)	15,202	18.35	+4.77	**5**	+1
United We Can–United Left–Equo–MAC (Podemos–IU–Equo–MAC)^{1}	8,968	10.82	−4.52	**3**	−2
Vox (Vox)	5,456	6.59	+5.94	**1**	+1
With You, We Are Democracy (Contigo)	1,118	1.35	New	0	±0
Let's Win Albacete (Ganemos)	262	0.32	New	0	±0
Union of Independent Citizens (UCIN)	223	0.27	−0.86	0	±0
Communist Party of the Peoples of Spain (PCPE)	218	0.26	−0.56	0	±0
Together We Win (JC)	131	0.16	New	0	±0
Blank ballots	713	0.86	−1.03		
**Total**	**82,853**			**27**	**±0**
Valid votes	82,853	99.30	+0.75		
Invalid votes	587	0.70	−0.75		
**Votes cast / turnout**	**83,440**	**62.18**	**−5.15**		
Abstentions	50,744	37.82	+5.15		
**Registered voters**	**134,184**				
Sources
Footnotes: ^{1} United We Can–United Left–Equo–MAC results are compared to Let's Win Albacete totals in the 2015 election.

=== Ciudad Real ===
Population: 74,743

← Summary of the 26 May 2019 City Council of Ciudad Real election results →
Parties and alliances	Popular vote			Seats	
Parties and alliances	Votes	%	±pp	Total	+/−
Spanish Socialist Workers' Party (PSOE)	14,604	38.68	+7.47	**10**	+1
People's Party (PP)	12,463	33.01	−3.79	**9**	−1
Citizens–Party of the Citizenry (Cs)	4,727	12.52	+5.03	**3**	+1
United We Can–United Left (Podemos–IU)^{1}	2,886	7.64	−8.05	**2**	−2
Vox (Vox)	2,577	6.82	+4.74	**1**	+1
Real Spain (ER)	156	0.41	New	0	±0
Blank ballots	347	0.92	−1.87		
**Total**	**37,760**			**25**	**±0**
Valid votes	37,760	99.21	+1.19		
Invalid votes	301	0.79	−1.19		
**Votes cast / turnout**	**38,061**	**64.61**	**−2.10**		
Abstentions	20,847	35.39	+2.10		
**Registered voters**	**58,908**				
Sources
Footnotes: ^{1} United We Can–United Left results are compared to Let's Win Ciudad Real totals in the 2015 election.

=== Cuenca ===
Population: 54,898

← Summary of the 26 May 2019 City Council of Cuenca election results →
Parties and alliances	Popular vote			Seats	
Parties and alliances	Votes	%	±pp	Total	+/−
Spanish Socialist Workers' Party (PSOE)	10,035	36.19	+3.61	**11**	+2
Cuenca Unites Us (CNU)	6,216	22.42	New	**6**	+6
People's Party (PP)	5,815	20.97	−16.35	**6**	−4
Citizens–Party of the Citizenry (Cs)	1,600	5.77	−4.56	**1**	−2
We Can–Equo (Cuenca on the Move!) (Podemos–Equo)	1,522	5.49	New	**1**	+1
Vox (Vox)	1,004	3.62	+2.25	0	±0
United Left–Castilian Party–Commoners' Land (IU–PCAS)^{1}	908	3.27	−10.52	0	−3
Candidacy of Cuenca (CdCuenca)	354	1.28	New	0	±0
Libertarian Party (P–LIB)	26	0.09	New	0	±0
Blank ballots	246	0.89	−1.58		
**Total**	**27,726**			**25**	**±0**
Valid votes	27,726	99.37	+1.52		
Invalid votes	177	0.63	−1.52		
**Votes cast / turnout**	**27,903**	**66.70**	**−1.45**		
Abstentions	13,932	33.30	+1.45		
**Registered voters**	**41,835**				
Sources
Footnotes: ^{1} United Left–Castilian Party–Commoners' Land results are compared to the combined totals of United Left of Castilla–La Mancha and Castilian Party–Commoners' Land–Pact in the 2015 election.

=== Guadalajara ===
Population: 84,910

← Summary of the 26 May 2019 City Council of Guadalajara election results →
Parties and alliances	Popular vote			Seats	
Parties and alliances	Votes	%	±pp	Total	+/−
Spanish Socialist Workers' Party (PSOE)	14,835	35.19	+6.90	10	+2
People's Party (PP)	13,158	31.21	−6.01	8	−3
Citizens–Party of the Citizenry (Cs)	5,126	12.16	+2.58	3	+1
Vox (Vox)	3,231	7.66	+6.17	2	+2
We Can–Equo (Podemos–Equo)^{1}	2,947	6.99	−9.82	1	−3
Guadalajara Must Be Cherished (AIKE)	2,622	6.13	New	1	+1
Blank ballots	276	0.65	−1.16		
**Total**	**42,156**			25	**±0**
Valid votes	42,156	99.27	+1.00		
Invalid votes	308	0.73	−1.00		
**Votes cast / turnout**	**42,464**	**68.46**	**−0.85**		
Abstentions	19,566	31.54	+0.85		
**Registered voters**	**62,030**				
Sources
Footnotes: ^{1} We Can–Equo results are compared to Guadalajara Now totals in the 2015 election.

=== Talavera de la Reina ===
Population: 83,009

← Summary of the 26 May 2019 City Council of Talavera de la Reina election results →
Parties and alliances	Popular vote			Seats	
Parties and alliances	Votes	%	±pp	Total	+/−
Spanish Socialist Workers' Party (PSOE)	18,348	46.63	+14.71	**14**	+6
People's Party (PP)	7,856	19.97	−19.51	**5**	−6
Vox (Vox)	4,688	11.91	New	**3**	+3
Citizens–Party of the Citizenry (Cs)	4,294	10.91	+2.22	**3**	+1
United We Can–United Left–Equo (Podemos–IU–Equo)	1,613	4.10	New	0	±0
Talavera Now (ahoraTalavera)^{1}	1,177	2.99	−11.60	0	−4
For Talavera (XT)	1,017	2.58	New	0	±0
Blank ballots	353	0.90	−0.68		
**Total**	**39,346**			**25**	**±0**
Valid votes	39,346	99.10	+0.89		
Invalid votes	358	0.90	−0.89		
**Votes cast / turnout**	**39,704**	**63.18**	**−1.36**		
Abstentions	23,134	36.82	+1.36		
**Registered voters**	**62,838**				
Sources
Footnotes: ^{1} Talavera Now results are compared to Let's Win Talavera totals in the 2015 election.

=== Toledo ===
Population: 84,282

← Summary of the 26 May 2019 City Council of Toledo election results →
Parties and alliances	Popular vote			Seats	
Parties and alliances	Votes	%	±pp	Total	+/−
Spanish Socialist Workers' Party (PSOE)	19,258	44.23	+14.06	**12**	+3
People's Party (PP)	11,081	25.45	−7.48	**6**	−3
Citizens–Party of the Citizenry (Cs)	5,463	12.55	+2.42	**3**	±0
Vox (Vox)	3,615	8.30	+6.53	**2**	+2
United We Can–United Left (Podemos–IU)^{1}	3,524	8.09	−8.61	**2**	−2
Let's Win Toledo (Ganemos)	178	0.41	New	0	±0
Spanish Phalanx of the CNSO (FE de las JONS)	39	0.09	New	0	±0
Blank ballots	381	0.88	−0.80		
**Total**	**43,539**			**25**	**±0**
Valid votes	43,539	99.21	+0.75		
Invalid votes	347	0.79	−0.75		
**Votes cast / turnout**	**43,886**	**69.76**	**−2.18**		
Abstentions	19,028	30.24	+2.18		
**Registered voters**	**62,914**				
Sources
Footnotes: ^{1} United We Can–United Left results are compared to Let's Win Toledo totals in the 2015 election.

== See also ==
- 2019 Castilian-Manchegan regional election
