= 2023 Spanish local elections =

- 28 May 2023 (Note: By-elections were held on 26 November 2023 in those constituencies where results were annulled by a final sentence following an electoral petition, or where elections were not held due to a lack of candidates.)

All 66,976 councillors in 8,132 municipal councils (Note: Including 50 seats in the assemblies of Ceuta and Melilla.) All 1,424 provincial/island seats in 44 provinces (Note: Including: 1,038 seats in 38 provincial deputations; 157 seats in 7 Canarian island cabildos; 153 seats in 3 Basque foral deputations; 76 seats in 4 Balearic island councils.)
- Opinion polls
- Registered: 35,534,425 ▲0.7%
- Turnout: 22,714,076 (63.9%) ▼1.3 pp
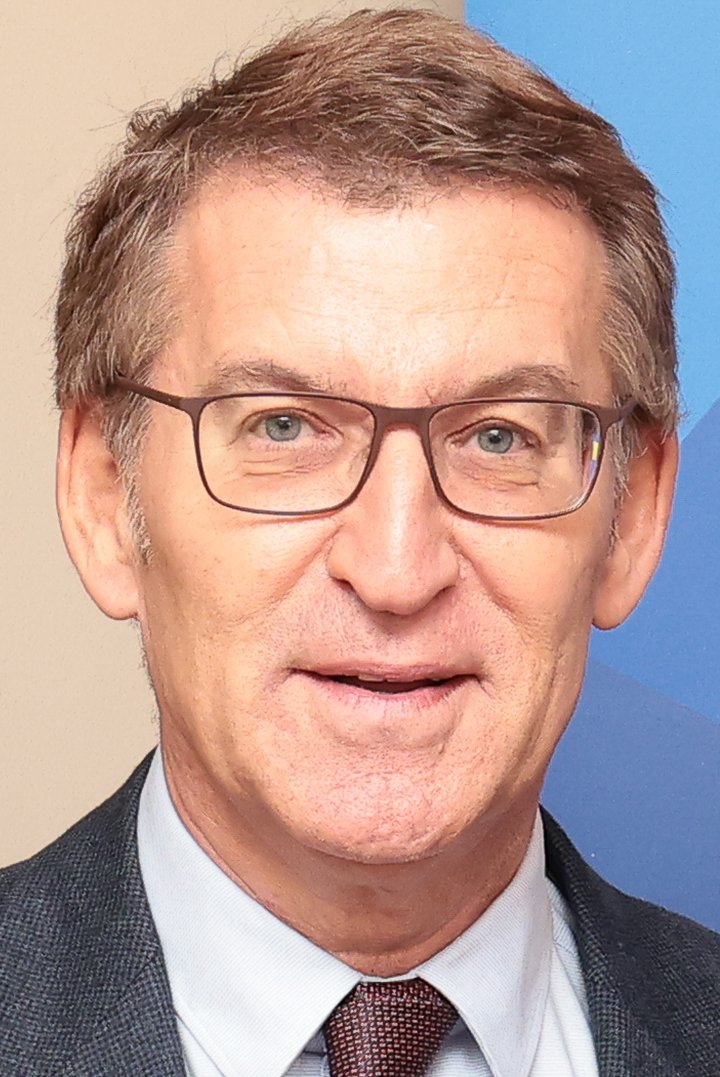

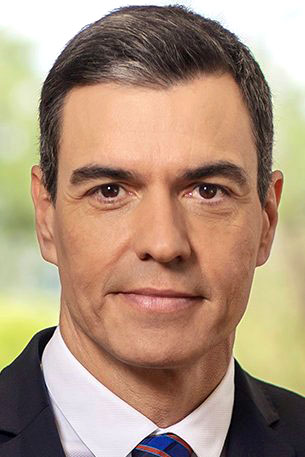

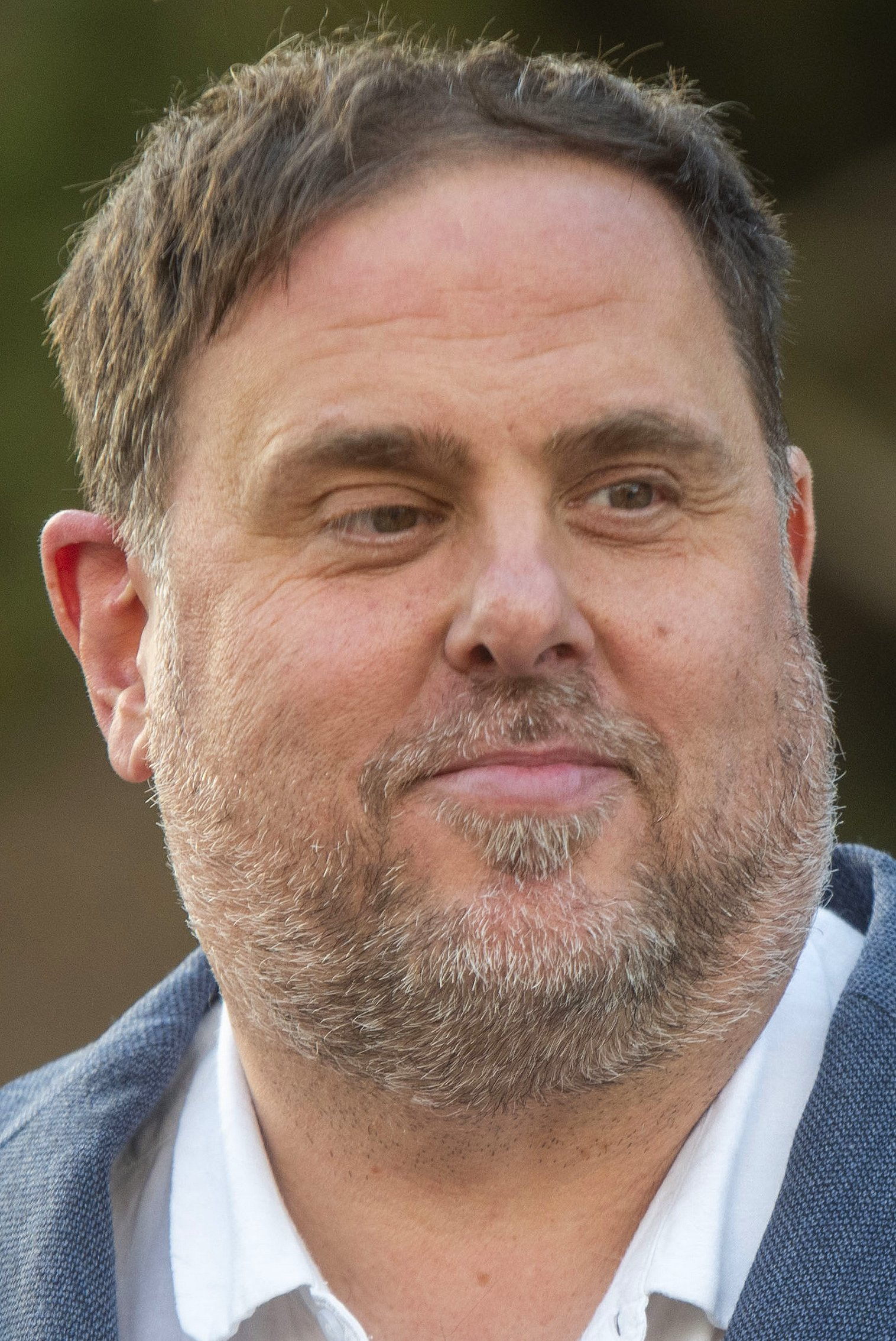

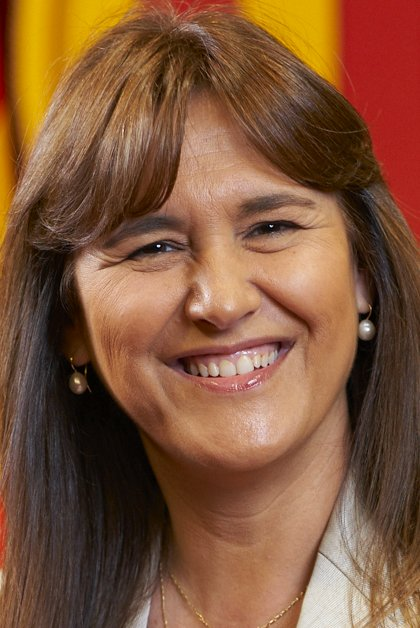

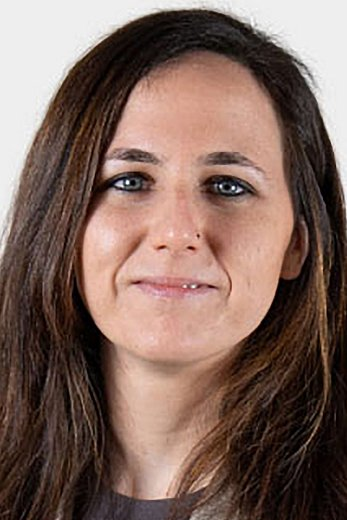

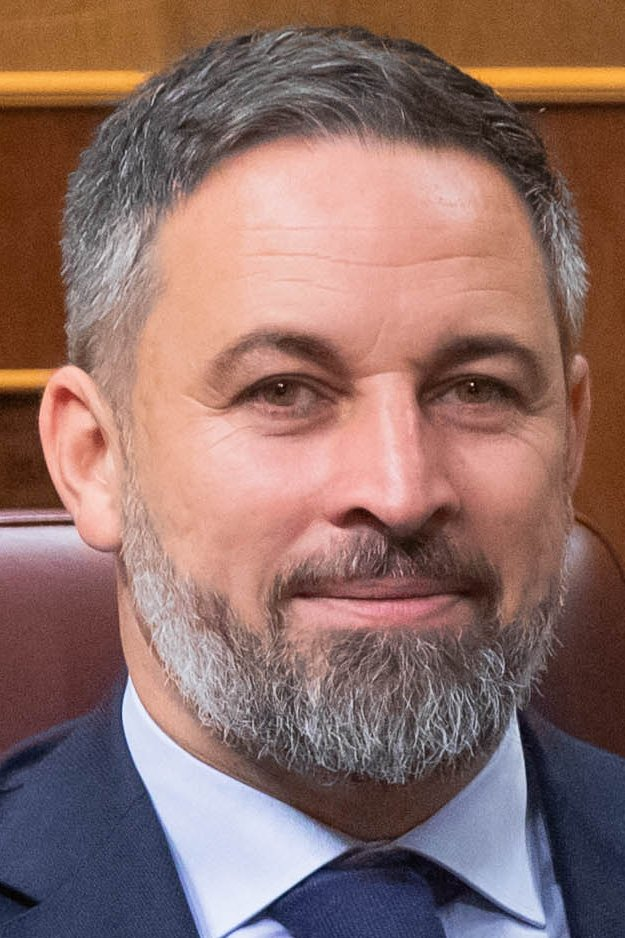
| | First party | Second party | Third party |
|---|---|---|---|
| Leader | Alberto Núñez Feijóo | Pedro Sánchez | Oriol Junqueras |
| Party | PP | PSOE | ERC–AM |
| Leader since | 2 April 2022 | 18 June 2017 | 17 September 2011 |
| Last election | 20,376 c., 22.7% 411 p. | 22,341 c., 29.4% 548 p. | 3,125 c., 3.6% 47 p. |
| Seats won | 23,442 c. 520 p. | 20,790 c. 491 p. | 2,906 c. 36 p. |
| Seat change | ▲3,066 c. ▲109 p. | ▼1,551 c. ▼57 p. | ▼219 c. ▼11 p. |
| Popular vote | 7,075,734 | 6,296,790 | 526,242 |
| Percentage | 31.6% | 28.1% | 2.4% |
| Swing | ▲8.9 pp | ▼1.3 pp | ▼1.2 pp |
| | Fourth party | Fifth party | Sixth party |
| Leader | Laura Borràs | Ione Belarra | Santiago Abascal |
| Party | JxCat–CM | Unidas Podemos | Vox |
| Leader since | 4 June 2022 | 13 June 2021 | 20 September 2014 |
| Last election | 2,804 c., 2.5% (Note: Results for JxCat–Junts in the 2019 elections.); 35 p. | 2,683 c., 8.9% (Note: Results for Unidas Podemos (8.8%, 2,667 c. and 70 p.) and SSP not including La Gomera (0.1%, 16 c. and 0 p.) in the 2019 elections.); 70 p. | 547 c., 3.7% 13 p. |
| Seats won | 2,687 c. 40 p. | 1,943 c. 31 p. | 1,671 c. 49 p. |
| Seat change | ▼117 c. ▲5 p. | ▼740 c. ▼39 p. | ▲1,124 c. ▲36 p. |
| Popular vote | 553,872 | 1,405,621 | 1,605,961 |
| Percentage | 2.5% | 6.3% | 7.2% |
| Swing | 0.0 pp | ▼2.6 pp | ▲3.5 pp |
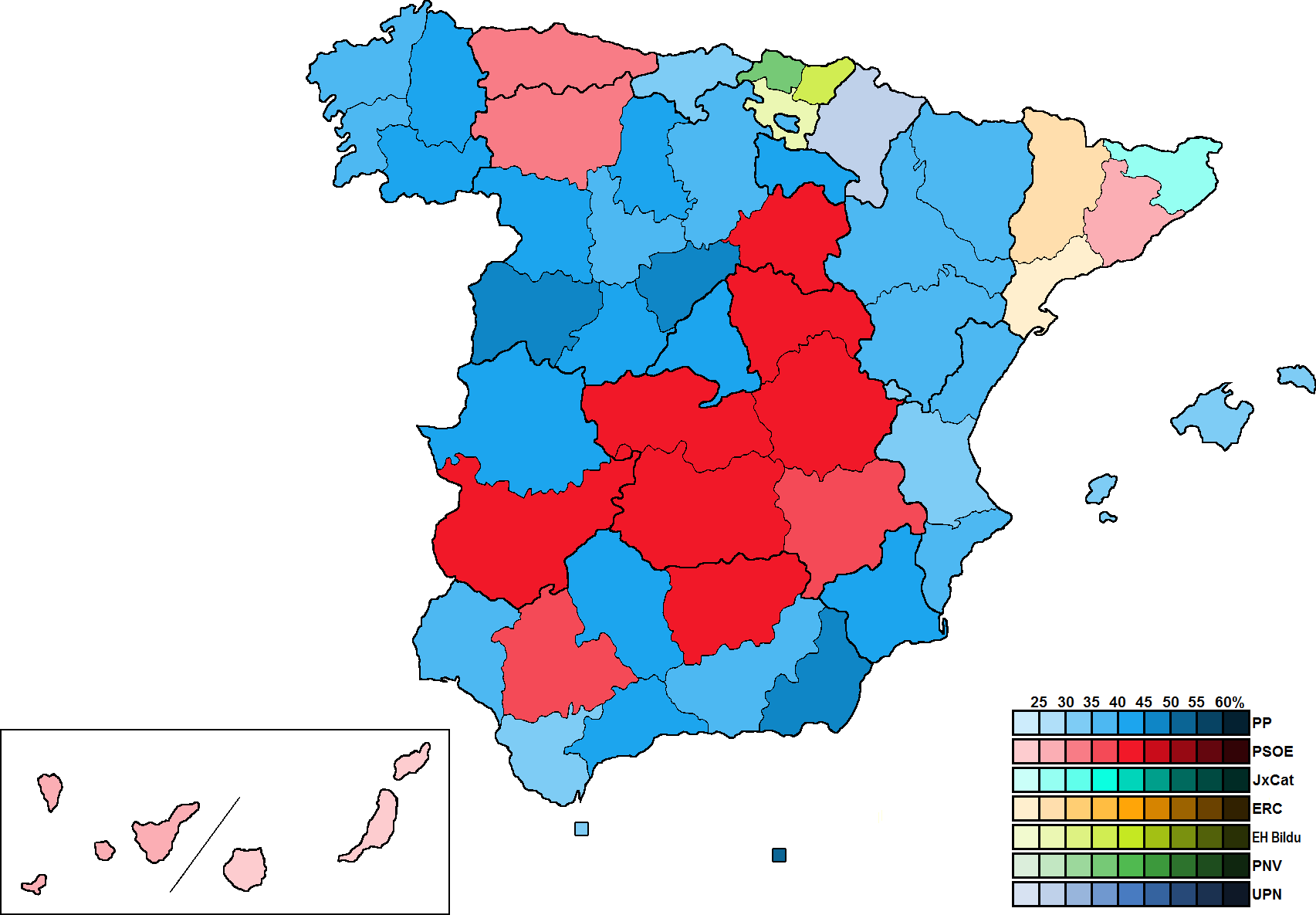
- Provincial results map for municipal elections

Local elections were held in Spain on 28 May 2023 to elect all 66,976 councillors in the 8,131 Spanish municipalities (including 50 seats in the assemblies of the autonomous cities of Ceuta and Melilla), all 1,191 provincial seats in 41 provinces (including 38 indirectly-elected provincial deputations and the three foral deputations in the Basque Country) and 233 seats in ten island councils (seven Canarian and four Balearic ones). They were held concurrently with regional elections in twelve autonomous communities.

The elections took place following a period of instability dominated by the outbreak of the COVID-19 pandemic in March 2020 and its political and economical consequences, including the worst worldwide recession since the Great Depression resulting from the massive lockdowns enforced to reduce the spread of SARS-CoV-2, as well as the economic impact of the 2022 Russian invasion of Ukraine.

The People's Party (PP) emerged as the first political force and was able to flip the control of a large number of major cities, despite winning the popular vote to the ruling Spanish Socialist Workers' Party (PSOE) by just three percentage points. This outcome prompted Prime Minister Pedro Sánchez to call a snap general election for July, which led to an insufficient PP victory and to Sánchez's re-election.

== Overview ==
=== Local government ===
Under the 1978 Constitution, the governance of municipalities in Spain was centered on the figure of city councils (Spanish: ayuntamientos), local corporations with independent legal personality composed of a mayor, a government council and an elected legislative assembly. The mayor was indirectly elected by the local assembly, requiring an absolute majority; otherwise, the candidate from the most-voted party automatically became mayor (ties were resolved by drawing lots). The concejo abierto system (English: open council), under which voters directly elected the local mayor by plurality voting, was reserved for some minor local entities.

Provincial deputations were the governing bodies of provinces in Spain—except for single-province autonomous communities—having an administration role of municipal activities and composed of a provincial president, an administrative body, and a plenary. For insular provinces, such as the Balearic and Canary Islands, deputations were replaced by island councils in each of the islands or group of islands. For Gran Canaria, Tenerife, Fuerteventura, La Gomera, El Hierro, Lanzarote and La Palma, this figure was referred to in Spanish as cabildo insular, whereas for Mallorca, Menorca, Ibiza and Formentera, its name was consejo insular (Catalan: consell insular). The three Basque provinces had foral deputations instead (called General Assemblies, or Juntas Generales).

=== Date ===
The term of local assemblies in Spain expired four years after the date of their previous election, with election day being fixed for the fourth Sunday of May every four years. The election decree was required to be issued no later than 54 days before the scheduled election date and published on the following day in the Official State Gazette (BOE). The previous local elections were held on 26 May 2019, setting the date for election day on the fourth Sunday of May four years later, which was 28 May 2023.

Local assemblies could not be dissolved before the expiration of their term, except in cases of mismanagement that seriously harmed the public interest and implied a breach of constitutional obligations, in which case the Council of Ministers could—optionally—decide to call a by-election. Subsequent by-elections were called on 3 October, for 26 November.

Elections to the assemblies of local entities were officially called on 4 April 2023 with the publication of the corresponding decree in the BOE, setting election day for 28 May.

=== Electoral system ===
Voting for local assemblies and island councils was based on universal suffrage, comprising all Spanish nationals over 18 years of age, registered and residing in the municipality or council and with full political rights (provided that they had not been deprived of the right to vote by a final sentence), as well as resident non-national European citizens, and those whose country of origin allowed reciprocal voting by virtue of a treaty.

Local councillors were elected using the D'Hondt method and closed-list proportional voting, with a five percent-threshold of valid votes (including blank ballots) in each constituency. Each municipality or council was a multi-member constituency, with a number of seats based on the following scale:

| Population | Councillors | | |
| Population | Municipalities | Canary Islands | Balearic Islands (Note: For the Island Council of Formentera, councillors in the city council served as island councillors.) |
|---|---|---|---|
| <100 | 3 | No island below 5,000 inhabitants | Fixed number: Ibiza: 13; Menorca: 13; Mallorca: 33; Formentera: Same as homonymous city council |
| 101–250 | 5 | No island below 5,000 inhabitants | Fixed number: Ibiza: 13; Menorca: 13; Mallorca: 33; Formentera: Same as homonymous city council |
| 251–1,000 | 7 | No island below 5,000 inhabitants | Fixed number: Ibiza: 13; Menorca: 13; Mallorca: 33; Formentera: Same as homonymous city council |
| 1,001–2,000 | 9 | No island below 5,000 inhabitants | Fixed number: Ibiza: 13; Menorca: 13; Mallorca: 33; Formentera: Same as homonymous city council |
| 2,001–5,000 | 11 | No island below 5,000 inhabitants | Fixed number: Ibiza: 13; Menorca: 13; Mallorca: 33; Formentera: Same as homonymous city council |
| 5,001–10,000 | 13 | 11 | Fixed number: Ibiza: 13; Menorca: 13; Mallorca: 33; Formentera: Same as homonymous city council |
| 10,001–20,000 | 17 | 13 | Fixed number: Ibiza: 13; Menorca: 13; Mallorca: 33; Formentera: Same as homonymous city council |
| 20,001–50,000 | 21 | 17 | Fixed number: Ibiza: 13; Menorca: 13; Mallorca: 33; Formentera: Same as homonymous city council |
| 50,001–100,000 | 25 | 21 | Fixed number: Ibiza: 13; Menorca: 13; Mallorca: 33; Formentera: Same as homonymous city council |
| >100,001 | +1 per each 100,000 inhabitants or fraction +1 if total is an even number | | Fixed number: Ibiza: 13; Menorca: 13; Mallorca: 33; Formentera: Same as homonymous city council |

Councillors in municipalities below 250 inhabitants were elected using open-list partial block voting, with voters in constituencies between 101 and 250 inhabitants choosing up to four candidates; and in those below 100, up to two.

Most provincial deputations were indirectly elected by applying the D'Hondt method and a three percent-threshold of valid votes to municipal results—excluding candidacies not electing any councillor—in each judicial district. Seats were allocated to provincial deputations based on the following scale (with each judicial district being assigned an initial minimum of one seat and a maximum of three-fifths of the total number of provincial seats, with the remaining ones distributed in proportion to population):

| Population | Seats |
|---|---|
| <500,000 | 25 |
| 500,001–1,000,000 | 27 |
| 1,000,001–3,500,000 | 31 |
| >3,500,001 | 51 |

The General Assemblies of Álava, Biscay and Gipuzkoa were directly elected by voters under their own, specific electoral regulations.

The law did not provide for by-elections to fill vacant seats; instead, any vacancies arising after the proclamation of candidates and during the legislative term were filled by the next candidates on the party lists or, when required, by designated substitutes.

== Parties and candidates ==
The electoral law allowed for parties and federations registered in the interior ministry, alliances and groupings of electors to present lists of candidates. Parties and federations intending to form an alliance were required to inform the relevant electoral commission within 10 days of the election call, whereas groupings of electors needed to secure the signature of a determined amount of the electors registered in the municipality for which they sought election, disallowing electors from signing for more than one list:

- At least one percent of the electors in municipalities with a population below 5,000 inhabitants, provided that the number of signers was more than double that of councillors at stake.
- At least 100 signatures in municipalities with a population between 5,001 and 10,000.
- At least 500 signatures in municipalities with a population between 10,001 and 50,000.
- At least 1,500 signatures in municipalities with a population between 50,001 and 150,000.
- At least 3,000 signatures in municipalities with a population between 150,001 and 300,000.
- At least 5,000 signatures in municipalities with a population between 300,001 and 1,000,000.
- At least 8,000 signatures in municipalities with a population over 1,000,001.

Additionally, a balanced composition of men and women was required in the electoral lists, so that candidates of either sex made up at least 40 percent of the total composition.

== Campaign ==
=== Party slogans ===
| Party or alliance | Original slogan | English translation | Ref. |
|---|---|---|---|
| PSOE | « Vota lo que piensas » | "Vote for what you think" | |
| PP | « Entre todos » | "Between everyone" | |
| Cs | « Libérate » | "Free yourself" | |
| Unidas Podemos | « Valentía para transformar » | "Courage to transform" | |
| Vox | « Vota seguro » | "Vote safely" | |

=== Alleged vote-buying ===
During the month of May 2023, amidst the local elections campaign in Spain, numerous instances of vote-buying came to light in various municipalities across the country. These incidents implicated a wide range of political parties, including among others the Spanish Socialist Workers' Party (PSOE), the People's Party (PP) and Coalition for Melilla (CpM). Despite the scandal starting in Melilla, it later expanded to other municipalities in the south of Spain.

== Timetable ==
The key dates are listed below (all times are CET. The Canary Islands use WET (UTC+0) instead):

- 3 April: The election decree is issued with the countersign of the Prime Minister, ratified by the King.
- 4 April: Publication of the election decree in the Official State Gazette (BOE) and beginning of a suspension period of events for the inauguration of public works, services or projects.
- 7 April: Initial constitution of provincial and zone electoral commissions.
- 14 April: Deadline for parties and federations intending to enter into a coalition to inform the relevant electoral commission.
- 24 April: Deadline for parties, federations, coalitions, and groupings of electors to present lists of candidates to the relevant electoral commission.
- 26 April: Submitted lists of candidates are provisionally published in the BOE.
- 29 April: Deadline for citizens entered in the Register of Absent Electors Residing Abroad (CERA) and for citizens temporarily absent from Spain to apply for voting.
- 30 April: Deadline for parties, federations, coalitions, and groupings of electors to rectify irregularities in their lists.
- 1 May: Official proclamation of valid submitted lists of candidates.
- 2 May: Proclaimed lists are published in the BOE.
- 12 May: Official start of electoral campaigning.
- 18 May: Deadline to apply for postal voting.
- 23 May: Official start of legal ban on electoral opinion polling publication, dissemination or reproduction and deadline for CERA citizens to vote by mail.
- 24 May: Deadline for postal and temporarily absent voters to issue their votes.
- 26 May: Last day of official electoral campaigning and deadline for CERA citizens to vote in a ballot box in the relevant consular office or division.
- 27 May: Official 24-hour ban on political campaigning prior to the general election (reflection day).
- 28 May: Polling day (polling stations open at 9 am and close at 8 pm or once voters present in a queue at/outside the polling station at 8 pm have cast their vote). Provisional counting of votes starts immediately.

== Results ==
=== Municipal ===
==== Overall ====
← Summary of the 28 May 2023 Spanish municipal election results →
| Parties and alliances | Popular vote | | | Councillors | |
| Parties and alliances | Votes | % | ±pp | Total | +/− |
|---|---|---|---|---|---|
| People's Party (PP) | 7,075,734 | 31.61 | +8.95 | **23,442** | +3,066 |
| Spanish Socialist Workers' Party (PSOE) | 6,296,790 | 28.13 | −1.26 | **20,790** | −1,551 |
| Vox (Vox) | 1,605,961 | 7.18 | +3.48 | **1,671** | +1,124 |
| United We Can (Unidas Podemos) | 1,405,621 | 6.28 | −2.61 | **1,943** | −740 |
| United We Can (Podemos–IU–AV)^{1} | 1,136,505 | 5.08 | −2.20 | 1,699 | −704 |
| In Common We Can–Confluence (ECP–C) | 269,116 | 1.20 | −0.41 | 244 | −36 |
| Together for Catalonia–Municipal Commitment (JxCat–CM)^{2} | 553,872 | 2.47 | +0.02 | **2,687** | −117 |
| Republican Left of Catalonia–Municipal Agreement (ERC–AM) | 526,242 | 2.35 | −1.29 | **2,906** | −219 |
| More Madrid/More Country–Greens Equo (MM/MP–VQ) | 452,511 | 2.02 | −0.44 | **89** | +57 |
| More Madrid/More Country–Greens Equo (MM/MP–VQ) | 431,553 | 1.93 | −0.51 | 82 | +52 |
| Drago Greens Canaries (DVC) | 13,717 | 0.06 | New | 2 | +2 |
| More Madrid/More Country–Greens Equo–United Left (MM/MP–VQ–IU) | 7,241 | 0.03 | +0.01 | 5 | +3 |
| Basque Country Gather (EH Bildu) | 366,113 | 1.64 | +0.11 | **1,398** | +135 |
| Commitment Coalition: Agreement to Win (Compromís) | 332,371 | 1.49 | −0.03 | **673** | −61 |
| Citizens–Party of the Citizenry (CS) | 323,518 | 1.45 | −7.72 | **568** | −2,225 |
| Basque Nationalist Party (EAJ/PNV) | 323,274 | 1.44 | −0.35 | **988** | −77 |
| Galician Nationalist Bloc (BNG) | 249,078 | 1.11 | +0.26 | **591** | +135 |
| Canarian Coalition (CCa) | 172,056 | 0.77 | −0.01 | **308** | +4 |
| Popular Unity Candidacy–Municipalist Alternative (CUP–AMunt) | 134,753 | 0.60 | −0.18 | **315** | −21 |
| Navarrese People's Union (UPN)^{3} | 82,037 | 0.37 | −0.09 | **250** | −48 |
| New Canaries–Canarist Broad Front (NC–FAC) | 75,098 | 0.34 | ±0.00 | **118** | +13 |
| Regionalist Party of Cantabria (PRC) | 60,093 | 0.27 | −0.09 | **298** | −53 |
| Andalusia by Herself–Andalusian Unity (AxSí–UA) | 59,707 | 0.27 | +0.05 | **119** | +13 |
| Now Local Agreement (Ara PL) | 55,276 | 0.25 | New | **186** | +186 |
| Animalist Party with the Environment (PACMA)^{4} | 52,557 | 0.23 | +0.03 | 0 | ±0 |
| Asturias Forum (Foro)^{5} | 51,291 | 0.23 | +0.10 | **38** | −11 |
| More for Mallorca (Més) | 45,144 | 0.20 | ±0.00 | **111** | −9 |
| Forward Andalusia (Adelante Andalucía) | 44,610 | 0.20 | New | **9** | +9 |
| Leonese People's Union (UPL) | 36,750 | 0.16 | +0.07 | **234** | +83 |
| Empty Spain (España Vaciada) | 35,991 | 0.16 | +0.12 | **262** | +219 |
| Aragon Exists–Exists Coalition (Existe) | 20,072 | 0.09 | New | 157 | +157 |
| Empty Spain (España Vaciada) | 9,622 | 0.04 | New | 89 | +89 |
| Riojan Party+Empty Spain (PR+EV) | 6,297 | 0.03 | −0.01 | 16 | −27 |
| Brave (Valents) | 32,519 | 0.15 | New | **3** | +3 |
| Aragonese Union (CHA) | 30,185 | 0.13 | −0.01 | **133** | −15 |
| All for Terrassa (TxT) | 26,732 | 0.12 | ±0.00 | **11** | +1 |
| Citizens' Movement of Cartagena (MCC) | 23,947 | 0.11 | ±0.00 | **8** | ±0 |
| Coalition 100x100 (100x100) | 20,635 | 0.09 | ±0.00 | **25** | −6 |
| El Pi–Proposal for the Isles (El Pi)^{6} | 20,533 | 0.09 | −0.06 | **67** | −32 |
| Union of Independent Citizens (UCIN) | 20,371 | 0.09 | +0.01 | **66** | −7 |
| Neighbours' Alternative (AV) | 20,182 | 0.09 | ±0.00 | **32** | +4 |
| Aragonese Party (PAR) | 20,146 | 0.09 | −0.10 | **338** | −323 |
| Ourensan Democracy (DO) | 19,349 | 0.09 | +0.03 | **11** | +2 |
| Yes to the Future (GBai) | 19,261 | 0.09 | ±0.00 | **44** | −6 |
| For Ávila (XAV) | 17,443 | 0.08 | +0.01 | **142** | +62 |
| United for Gran Canaria (UxGC) | 15,850 | 0.07 | New | **11** | +11 |
| Blank Seats to Leave Empty Seats (EB) | 15,757 | 0.07 | +0.06 | 0 | −2 |
| With You, We Are Democracy (Contigo) | 13,561 | 0.06 | −0.02 | **19** | ±0 |
| All for Empordà (Txl'E) | 12,799 | 0.06 | +0.03 | **79** | +45 |
| It Unites Us (Ens Uneix)^{7} | 11,971 | 0.05 | −0.01 | **38** | +10 |
| Union for Leganés (ULEG) | 11,408 | 0.05 | −0.01 | **3** | −1 |
| For my Town (Por mi Pueblo) | 11,182 | 0.05 | +0.01 | **37** | +14 |
| Citizens for Canarian Change (CIUCA) | 10,223 | 0.05 | +0.01 | **7** | −6 |
| Independents of La Selva (IdSelva) | 8,091 | 0.04 | ±0.00 | **50** | +2 |
| Zamora Yes (ZSí) | 7,731 | 0.03 | New | **100** | +100 |
| Gomera Socialist Group (ASG) | 5,736 | 0.03 | +0.01 | **36** | +2 |
| More for Menorca (MxMe) | 4,595 | 0.02 | ±0.00 | **13** | ±0 |
| Let's Go Palencia (VP) | 4,177 | 0.02 | New | **3** | +3 |
| Feel Aranda (Sentir Aranda) | 4,118 | 0.02 | New | **6** | +6 |
| Municipal Assemblies of Fuerteventura (AMF) | 3,159 | 0.01 | ±0.00 | **6** | +2 |
| The Union of Formentera (PP–CompromísFormentera) (Sa Unió) | 1,870 | 0.01 | ±0.00 | **9** | +3 |
| Independent Herrenian Group (AHI) | 1,647 | 0.01 | ±0.00 | **9** | +1 |
| Initiative for La Gomera (IxLG)^{8} | 1,571 | 0.01 | ±0.00 | **7** | +2 |
| Herrenian Assembly (AH) | 1,524 | 0.01 | New | **8** | +8 |
| People for Formentera (GxF) | 1,030 | 0.00 | −0.01 | **5** | −1 |
| Others (lists at <0.05% not securing any provincial or island seat) | 1,237,970 | 5.53 | — | **5,656** | +203 |
| Blank ballots | 307,220 | 1.37 | +0.43 | | |
| **Total** | **22,380,941** | | | **66,976** | **−3** |
| Valid votes | 22,380,941 | 98.53 | −0.55 | | |
| Invalid votes | 333,135 | 1.47 | +0.55 | | |
| **Votes cast / turnout** | **22,714,076** | **63.92** | **−1.27** | | |
| Abstentions | 12,820,349 | 36.08 | +1.27 | | |
| **Registered voters** | **35,534,425** | | | | |
Sources
Footnotes: ^{1} United We Can results are compared to the combined totals of United We Can and Yes We Can (not including La Gomera) in the 2019 elections.; ^{2} Together for Catalonia–Municipal Commitment results are compared to Together for Catalonia–Together totals in the 2019 elections.; ^{3} Navarrese People's Union results are compared to Sum Navarre totals in the 2019 elections.; ^{4} Animalist Party with the Environment results are compared to Animalist Party Against Mistreatment of Animals totals in the 2019 elections.; ^{5} Asturias Forum results are compared to Forum of Citizens totals in the 2019 elections.; ^{6} El Pi–Proposal for the Isles results are compared to the combined totals of El Pi–Proposal for the Isles, Proposal for Ibiza and EPIC Ibiza Citizen Movement in the 2019 elections.; ^{7} It Unites Us results are compared to Vall d'Albaida Unites Us totals in the 2019 elections.; ^{8} Initiative for La Gomera results are compared to Yes We Can totals in La Gomera in the 2019 elections.

Popular vote
| PP | 31.61% |
| PSOE | 28.13% |
| Vox | 7.18% |
| Unidas Podemos | 6.28% |
| JxCat–CM | 2.47% |
| ERC–AM | 2.35% |
| MM/MP–VQ | 2.02% |
| EH Bildu | 1.64% |
| Compromís | 1.49% |
| CS | 1.45% |
| EAJ/PNV | 1.44% |
| BNG | 1.11% |
| CCa | 0.77% |
| CUP–AMunt | 0.60% |
| Others | 10.08% |
| Blank ballots | 1.37% |

==== City control ====
The following table lists party control in provincial capitals (highlighted in bold), as well as in municipalities above 75,000. Gains for a party are highlighted in that party's colour.

| Municipality | Population | Previous control | New control |
|---|---|---|---|
| **A Coruña** | 244,700 | Spanish Socialist Workers' Party (PSOE) | Spanish Socialist Workers' Party (PSOE) |
| **Albacete** | 172,357 | Spanish Socialist Workers' Party (PSOE) | People's Party (PP) |
| Alcalá de Guadaíra | 75,917 | Spanish Socialist Workers' Party (PSOE) | Spanish Socialist Workers' Party (PSOE) |
| Alcalá de Henares | 196,888 | Spanish Socialist Workers' Party (PSOE) | People's Party (PP) |
| Alcobendas | 117,041 | Spanish Socialist Workers' Party (PSOE) | People's Party (PP) |
| Alcorcón | 170,296 | Spanish Socialist Workers' Party (PSOE) | Spanish Socialist Workers' Party (PSOE) |
| Algeciras | 122,368 | People's Party (PP) | People's Party (PP) |
| **Alicante** | 338,577 | People's Party (PP) | People's Party (PP) |
| **Almería** | 199,237 | People's Party (PP) | People's Party (PP) |
| Arona | 82,982 | Spanish Socialist Workers' Party (PSOE) | People's Party (PP) |
| **Ávila** | 57,730 | For Ávila (XAV) | For Ávila (XAV) |
| Avilés | 75,877 | Spanish Socialist Workers' Party (PSOE) | Spanish Socialist Workers' Party (PSOE) |
| **Badajoz** | 150,146 | Citizens–Party of the Citizenry (CS) | People's Party (PP) |
| Badalona | 223,506 | Socialists' Party of Catalonia (PSC–PSOE) | People's Party (PP) |
| Barakaldo | 100,535 | Basque Nationalist Party (EAJ/PNV) | Basque Nationalist Party (EAJ/PNV) |
| **Barcelona** | 1,636,193 | Barcelona in Common (BComú) | Socialists' Party of Catalonia (PSC–PSOE) |
| **Bilbao** | 344,127 | Basque Nationalist Party (EAJ/PNV) | Basque Nationalist Party (EAJ/PNV) |
| **Burgos** | 173,483 | Spanish Socialist Workers' Party (PSOE) | People's Party (PP) |
| **Cáceres** | 95,456 | Spanish Socialist Workers' Party (PSOE) | People's Party (PP) |
| **Cádiz** | 113,066 | Forward Andalusia (Adelante) | People's Party (PP) |
| Cartagena | 216,961 | People's Party (PP) | People's Party (PP) |
| **Castellón de la Plana** | 171,857 | Spanish Socialist Workers' Party (PSOE) | People's Party (PP) |
| Chiclana de la Frontera | 87,493 | Spanish Socialist Workers' Party (PSOE) | Spanish Socialist Workers' Party (PSOE) |
| **Ciudad Real** | 74,850 | Citizens–Party of the Citizenry (CS) | People's Party (PP) |
| **Córdoba** | 319,515 | People's Party (PP) | People's Party (PP) |
| Cornellà de Llobregat | 89,039 | Socialists' Party of Catalonia (PSC–PSOE) | Socialists' Party of Catalonia (PSC–PSOE) |
| Coslada | 80,596 | Spanish Socialist Workers' Party (PSOE) | Spanish Socialist Workers' Party (PSOE) |
| **Cuenca** | 53,389 | Spanish Socialist Workers' Party (PSOE) | Spanish Socialist Workers' Party (PSOE) |
| **Donostia/San Sebastián** | 187,849 | Basque Nationalist Party (EAJ/PNV) | Basque Nationalist Party (EAJ/PNV) |
| Dos Hermanas | 137,561 | Spanish Socialist Workers' Party (PSOE) | Spanish Socialist Workers' Party (PSOE) |
| El Ejido | 87,500 | People's Party (PP) | People's Party (PP) |
| El Puerto de Santa María | 89,435 | People's Party (PP) | People's Party (PP) |
| Elche | 235,580 | Spanish Socialist Workers' Party (PSOE) | People's Party (PP) |
| Ferrol | 64,158 (Note: Reached 75,000 in 1970–2007.) | Spanish Socialist Workers' Party (PSOE) | People's Party (PP) |
| Fuengirola | 83,226 | People's Party (PP) | People's Party (PP) |
| Fuenlabrada | 189,891 | Spanish Socialist Workers' Party (PSOE) | Spanish Socialist Workers' Party (PSOE) |
| Gandía | 75,911 | Spanish Socialist Workers' Party (PSOE) | Spanish Socialist Workers' Party (PSOE) |
| Getafe | 183,218 | Spanish Socialist Workers' Party (PSOE) | Spanish Socialist Workers' Party (PSOE) |
| Getxo | 76,365 | Basque Nationalist Party (EAJ/PNV) | Basque Nationalist Party (EAJ/PNV) |
| Gijón | 267,706 | Spanish Socialist Workers' Party (PSOE) | Asturias Forum (Foro) |
| **Girona** | 102,666 | Together for Catalonia (JxCat) | Popular Unity Candidacy (CUP) |
| **Granada** | 228,682 | Spanish Socialist Workers' Party (PSOE) | People's Party (PP) |
| **Guadalajara** | 87,452 | Spanish Socialist Workers' Party (PSOE) | People's Party (PP) |
| **Huelva** | 141,854 | Spanish Socialist Workers' Party (PSOE) | People's Party (PP) |
| **Huesca** | 53,305 | Spanish Socialist Workers' Party (PSOE) | People's Party (PP) |
| **Jaén** | 111,669 | Spanish Socialist Workers' Party (PSOE) | People's Party (PP) (PSOE in 2025) |
| Jerez de la Frontera | 212,730 | Spanish Socialist Workers' Party (PSOE) | People's Party (PP) |
| L'Hospitalet de Llobregat | 265,444 | Socialists' Party of Catalonia (PSC–PSOE) | Socialists' Party of Catalonia (PSC–PSOE) |
| **Las Palmas de Gran Canaria** | 378,797 | Spanish Socialist Workers' Party (PSOE) | Spanish Socialist Workers' Party (PSOE) |
| Las Rozas de Madrid | 95,725 | People's Party (PP) | People's Party (PP) |
| Leganés | 186,660 | Spanish Socialist Workers' Party (PSOE) | People's Party (PP) |
| **León** | 120,951 | Spanish Socialist Workers' Party (PSOE) | Spanish Socialist Workers' Party (PSOE) |
| **Lleida** | 140,797 | Republican Left of Catalonia (ERC) | Socialists' Party of Catalonia (PSC–PSOE) |
| **Logroño** | 150,020 | Spanish Socialist Workers' Party (PSOE) | People's Party (PP) |
| Lorca | 97,151 | Spanish Socialist Workers' Party (PSOE) | People's Party (PP) |
| **Lugo** | 97,211 | Spanish Socialist Workers' Party (PSOE) | Spanish Socialist Workers' Party (PSOE) (PP in 2026) |
| **Madrid** | 3,280,782 | People's Party (PP) | People's Party (PP) |
| **Málaga** | 579,076 | People's Party (PP) | People's Party (PP) |
| Manresa | 77,459 | Republican Left of Catalonia (ERC) | Republican Left of Catalonia (ERC) |
| Marbella | 150,725 | People's Party (PP) | People's Party (PP) |
| Mataró | 128,956 | Socialists' Party of Catalonia (PSC–PSOE) | Socialists' Party of Catalonia (PSC–PSOE) |
| Mijas | 89,502 | Spanish Socialist Workers' Party (PSOE) | Spanish Socialist Workers' Party (PSOE) (PP in 2023) |
| Móstoles | 208,761 | Spanish Socialist Workers' Party (PSOE) | People's Party (PP) |
| **Murcia** | 462,979 | Spanish Socialist Workers' Party (PSOE) | People's Party (PP) |
| Orihuela | 80,784 | Spanish Socialist Workers' Party (PSOE) | People's Party (PP) |
| **Ourense** | 103,756 | Ourensan Democracy (DO) | Ourensan Democracy (DO) |
| **Oviedo** | 215,167 | People's Party (PP) | People's Party (PP) |
| **Palencia** | 76,302 | Citizens–Party of the Citizenry (CS) | Spanish Socialist Workers' Party (PSOE) |
| **Palma** | 415,940 | Spanish Socialist Workers' Party (PSOE) | People's Party (PP) |
| **Pamplona** | 203,418 | Navarrese People's Union (UPN) | Navarrese People's Union (UPN) (EH Bildu in 2023) |
| Parla | 130,577 | Spanish Socialist Workers' Party (PSOE) | Spanish Socialist Workers' Party (PSOE) |
| **Pontevedra** | 82,828 | Galician Nationalist Bloc (BNG) | Galician Nationalist Bloc (BNG) |
| Pozuelo de Alarcón | 87,728 | People's Party (PP) | People's Party (PP) |
| Reus | 106,741 | Together for Catalonia (JxCat) | Socialists' Party of Catalonia (PSC–PSOE) |
| Rivas-Vaciamadrid | 96,690 | United Left (IU) | United Left (IU) |
| Roquetas de Mar | 102,881 | People's Party (PP) | People's Party (PP) |
| Rubí | 79,007 | Socialists' Party of Catalonia (PSC–PSOE) | Socialists' Party of Catalonia (PSC–PSOE) |
| Sabadell | 215,760 | Socialists' Party of Catalonia (PSC–PSOE) | Socialists' Party of Catalonia (PSC–PSOE) |
| **Salamanca** | 142,412 | People's Party (PP) | People's Party (PP) |
| San Cristóbal de La Laguna | 157,815 | Spanish Socialist Workers' Party (PSOE) | Spanish Socialist Workers' Party (PSOE) |
| San Fernando | 94,120 | Spanish Socialist Workers' Party (PSOE) | Spanish Socialist Workers' Party (PSOE) |
| San Sebastián de los Reyes | 91,083 | Spanish Socialist Workers' Party (PSOE) | People's Party (PP) |
| Sant Boi de Llobregat | 83,371 | Socialists' Party of Catalonia (PSC–PSOE) | Socialists' Party of Catalonia (PSC–PSOE) |
| Sant Cugat del Vallès | 95,725 | Republican Left of Catalonia (ERC) | Together for Catalonia (JxCat) |
| Santa Coloma de Gramenet | 117,981 | Socialists' Party of Catalonia (PSC–PSOE) | Socialists' Party of Catalonia (PSC–PSOE) |
| **Santa Cruz de Tenerife** | 208,688 | Canarian Coalition–Canarian Nationalist Party (CCa) | Canarian Coalition (CCa) |
| **Santander** | 171,693 | People's Party (PP) | People's Party (PP) |
| Santiago de Compostela | 98,179 | Spanish Socialist Workers' Party (PSOE) | Galician Nationalist Bloc (BNG) |
| **Segovia** | 50,802 | Spanish Socialist Workers' Party (PSOE) | People's Party (PP) |
| **Seville** | 681,998 | Spanish Socialist Workers' Party (PSOE) | People's Party (PP) |
| **Soria** | 39,450 | Spanish Socialist Workers' Party (PSOE) | Spanish Socialist Workers' Party (PSOE) |
| Talavera de la Reina | 83,247 | Spanish Socialist Workers' Party (PSOE) | People's Party (PP) |
| **Tarragona** | 134,883 | Republican Left of Catalonia (ERC) | Socialists' Party of Catalonia (PSC–PSOE) |
| Telde | 102,472 | New Canaries (NCa) | Citizens for Canarian Change (CIUCA) |
| Terrassa | 224,114 | All for Terrassa (TxT) | All for Terrassa (TxT) |
| **Teruel** | 35,900 | People's Party (PP) | People's Party (PP) |
| **Toledo** | 85,085 | Spanish Socialist Workers' Party (PSOE) | People's Party (PP) |
| Torrejón de Ardoz | 134,733 | People's Party (PP) | People's Party (PP) |
| Torrent | 85,142 | Spanish Socialist Workers' Party (PSOE) | People's Party (PP) |
| Torrevieja | 83,547 | People's Party (PP) | People's Party (PP) |
| **Valencia** | 792,492 | Commitment Coalition (Compromís) | People's Party (PP) |
| **Valladolid** | 295,639 | Spanish Socialist Workers' Party (PSOE) | People's Party (PP) |
| Vélez-Málaga | 83,899 | Spanish Socialist Workers' Party (PSOE) | People's Party (PP) |
| Vigo | 292,374 | Spanish Socialist Workers' Party (PSOE) | Spanish Socialist Workers' Party (PSOE) |
| **Vitoria-Gasteiz** | 253,672 | Basque Nationalist Party (EAJ/PNV) | Spanish Socialist Workers' Party (PSOE) |
| **Zamora** | 59,475 | United Left (IU) | United Left (IU) |
| **Zaragoza** | 673,010 | People's Party (PP) | People's Party (PP) |

==== Autonomous cities ====
The following table lists party control in the autonomous cities. Gains for a party are highlighted in that party's colour.

| City | Population | Previous control | New control |
|---|---|---|---|
| Ceuta | 83,117 | People's Party (PP) | People's Party (PP) |
| Melilla | 85,170 | Independent (INDEP) (Note: Former CS member.) | People's Party (PP) |

=== Provincial and island ===
==== Summary ====
← Summary of the 28 May 2023 Spanish provincial and island election results →
| Parties and alliances | Seats | | | | |
| Parties and alliances | PD | IC | FD | Total | +/− |
|---|---|---|---|---|---|
| People's Party (PP) | 447 | 58 | 15 | **520** | +109 |
| Spanish Socialist Workers' Party (PSOE) | 405 | 62 | 24 | **491** | −57 |
| Basque Nationalist Party (EAJ/PNV) | — | — | 55 | **55** | −7 |
| Basque Country Gather (EH Bildu) | — | — | 51 | **51** | +12 |
| Vox (Vox) | 35 | 13 | 1 | **49** | +36 |
| Canarian Coalition (CCa)^{2} | — | 41 | — | **41** | +3 |
| Together for Catalonia–Municipal Commitment (JxCat–CM)^{1} | 40 | — | — | **40** | +5 |
| Republican Left of Catalonia–Municipal Agreement (ERC–AM) | 36 | — | — | **36** | −11 |
| United We Can (Podemos–IU–AV) | 22 | 2 | 7 | **31** | −39 |
| United We Can (Podemos–IU–AV) | 17 | 2 | 7 | 26 | −38 |
| In Common We Can–Confluence (ECP–C) | 5 | — | — | 5 | −1 |
| Galician Nationalist Bloc (BNG) | 16 | — | — | **16** | +5 |
| New Canaries–Canarist Broad Front (NC–FAC) | — | 13 | — | **13** | +2 |
| Gomera Socialist Group (ASG) | — | 11 | — | **11** | ±0 |
| The Union of Formentera (PP–CompromísFormentera) (Sa Unió) | — | 9 | — | **9** | +3 |
| Commitment Coalition: Agreement to Win (Compromís) | 6 | — | — | **6** | −2 |
| For Ávila (XAV) | 5 | — | — | **5** | +1 |
| People for Formentera (GxF) | — | 5 | — | **5** | −1 |
| More for Mallorca (Més) | — | 4 | — | **4** | ±0 |
| Aragon Exists–Exists Coalition (Existe) | 4 | — | — | **4** | +4 |
| Independent Herrenian Group (AHI) | — | 4 | — | **4** | +1 |
| Leonese People's Union (UPL) | 3 | — | — | **3** | +2 |
| Ourensan Democracy (DO) | 3 | — | — | **3** | +1 |
| Herrenian Assembly (AH) | — | 3 | — | **3** | −1 |
| Popular Unity Candidacy–Municipalist Alternative (CUP–AMunt) | 2 | — | — | **2** | +1 |
| El Pi–Proposal for the Isles (El Pi) | — | 2 | — | **2** | −1 |
| Aragonese Party (PAR) | 2 | — | — | **2** | −6 |
| Coalition 100x100 (100x100) | 2 | — | — | **2** | ±0 |
| More for Menorca (MxMe) | — | 2 | — | **2** | −1 |
| Municipal Assemblies of Fuerteventura (AMF) | — | 2 | — | **2** | +2 |
| Initiative for La Gomera (IxLG)^{3} | — | 2 | — | **2** | ±0 |
| Now Local Agreement (Ara PL) | 1 | — | — | **1** | +1 |
| Aragonese Union (CHA) | 1 | — | — | **1** | +1 |
| All for Terrassa (TxT) | 1 | — | — | **1** | ±0 |
| Neighbours' Alternative (AV) | 1 | — | — | **1** | ±0 |
| All for Empordà (Txl'E) | 1 | — | — | **1** | ±0 |
| It Unites Us (Ens Uneix)^{4} | 1 | — | — | **1** | ±0 |
| Independents of La Selva (IdSelva) | 1 | — | — | **1** | ±0 |
| Zamora Yes (ZSí) | 1 | — | — | **1** | +1 |
| Let's Go Palencia (VP) | 1 | — | — | **1** | +1 |
| Feel Aranda (Sentir Aranda) | 1 | — | — | **1** | +1 |
| Citizens–Party of the Citizenry (CS) | 0 | 0 | — | 0 | −61 |
| Andalusia by Herself–Andalusian Unity (AxSí–UA) | 0 | — | — | 0 | −1 |
| Cuenca Unites Us (CNU) | 0 | — | — | 0 | −1 |
| Sorian People's Platform (PPSO) | n/a | n/a | n/a | 0 | −3 |
| **Total** | **1,038** | **233** | **153** | **1,424** | **±0** |
Sources
Footnotes: ^{1} Together for Catalonia–Municipal Commitment results are compared to Together totals in the 2019 elections.; ^{2} Canarian Coalition results are compared to Canarian Coalition–PNC–United for Gran Canaria totals in the 2019 elections.; ^{3} Initiative for La Gomera results are compared to Yes We Can totals in La Gomera in the 2019 elections.; ^{4} It Unites Us results are compared to Vall d'Albaida Unites Us totals in the 2019 elections.

==== Indirectly-elected ====
The following table lists party control in the indirectly-elected provincial deputations. Gains for a party are highlighted in that party's colour.

| Province | Population | Previous control | New control |
|---|---|---|---|
| A Coruña | 1,119,180 | Spanish Socialist Workers' Party (PSOE) | Spanish Socialist Workers' Party (PSOE) |
| Albacete | 385,727 | Spanish Socialist Workers' Party (PSOE) | Spanish Socialist Workers' Party (PSOE) |
| Alicante | 1,901,594 | People's Party (PP) | People's Party (PP) |
| Almería | 740,534 | People's Party (PP) | People's Party (PP) |
| Ávila | 158,140 | People's Party (PP) | People's Party (PP) |
| Badajoz | 666,971 | Spanish Socialist Workers' Party (PSOE) | Spanish Socialist Workers' Party (PSOE) |
| Barcelona | 5,727,615 | Socialists' Party of Catalonia (PSC–PSOE) | Socialists' Party of Catalonia (PSC–PSOE) |
| Burgos | 355,045 | People's Party (PP) | People's Party (PP) |
| Cáceres | 387,805 | Spanish Socialist Workers' Party (PSOE) | Spanish Socialist Workers' Party (PSOE) |
| Cádiz | 1,246,781 | Spanish Socialist Workers' Party (PSOE) | People's Party (PP) |
| Castellón | 590,616 | Spanish Socialist Workers' Party (PSOE) | People's Party (PP) |
| Ciudad Real | 490,806 | Spanish Socialist Workers' Party (PSOE) | People's Party (PP) |
| Córdoba | 772,464 | Spanish Socialist Workers' Party (PSOE) | People's Party (PP) |
| Cuenca | 195,215 | Spanish Socialist Workers' Party (PSOE) | Spanish Socialist Workers' Party (PSOE) |
| Girona | 793,478 | Together for Catalonia (JxCat) | Together for Catalonia (JxCat) |
| Granada | 921,987 | Spanish Socialist Workers' Party (PSOE) | People's Party (PP) |
| Guadalajara | 268,127 | Spanish Socialist Workers' Party (PSOE) | Spanish Socialist Workers' Party (PSOE) |
| Huelva | 528,763 | Spanish Socialist Workers' Party (PSOE) | People's Party (PP) |
| Huesca | 225,456 | Spanish Socialist Workers' Party (PSOE) | People's Party (PP) |
| Jaén | 623,761 | Spanish Socialist Workers' Party (PSOE) | Spanish Socialist Workers' Party (PSOE) |
| León | 448,179 | Spanish Socialist Workers' Party (PSOE) | Spanish Socialist Workers' Party (PSOE) |
| Lleida | 441,443 | Republican Left of Catalonia (ERC) | Republican Left of Catalonia (ERC) |
| Lugo | 323,989 | Spanish Socialist Workers' Party (PSOE) | Spanish Socialist Workers' Party (PSOE) |
| Málaga | 1,717,504 | People's Party (PP) | People's Party (PP) |
| Ourense | 304,280 | People's Party (PP) | People's Party (PP) |
| Palencia | 158,008 | People's Party (PP) | People's Party (PP) |
| Pontevedra | 943,015 | Spanish Socialist Workers' Party (PSOE) | People's Party (PP) |
| Salamanca | 325,898 | People's Party (PP) | People's Party (PP) |
| Segovia | 153,803 | People's Party (PP) | People's Party (PP) |
| Seville | 1,948,393 | Spanish Socialist Workers' Party (PSOE) | Spanish Socialist Workers' Party (PSOE) |
| Soria | 88,377 | People's Party (PP) | People's Party (PP) |
| Tarragona | 830,075 | Republican Left of Catalonia (ERC) | Republican Left of Catalonia (ERC) |
| Teruel | 134,421 | Spanish Socialist Workers' Party (PSOE) | People's Party (PP) |
| Toledo | 713,453 | Spanish Socialist Workers' Party (PSOE) | People's Party (PP) |
| Valencia | 2,605,757 | Spanish Socialist Workers' Party (PSOE) | People's Party (PP) |
| Valladolid | 517,975 | People's Party (PP) | People's Party (PP) |
| Zamora | 167,215 | Citizens–Party of the Citizenry (CS) | People's Party (PP) |
| Zaragoza | 966,438 | Spanish Socialist Workers' Party (PSOE) | Spanish Socialist Workers' Party (PSOE) |

==== Island councils ====
The following table lists party control in the island councils. Gains for a party are highlighted in that party's colour.

| Island | Population | Previous control | New control |
|---|---|---|---|
| El Hierro | 11,423 | Spanish Socialist Workers' Party (PSOE) | Independent Herrenian Group (AHI) (PSOE in 2023) |
| Formentera | 11,418 | People for Formentera (GxF) | Sa Unió de Formentera (Sa Unió) (INDEP in 2024; Sa Unió in 2024) |
| Fuerteventura | 120,021 | Spanish Socialist Workers' Party (PSOE) | Canarian Coalition (CCa) |
| Gran Canaria | 853,262 | New Canaries (NCa) | New Canaries (NCa) |
| Ibiza | 154,210 | People's Party (PP) | People's Party (PP) |
| La Gomera | 21,798 | Gomera Socialist Group (ASG) | Gomera Socialist Group (ASG) |
| La Palma | 83,439 | People's Party (PP) | Canarian Coalition (CCa) |
| Lanzarote | 156,112 | Spanish Socialist Workers' Party (PSOE) | Canarian Coalition (CCa) |
| Mallorca | 914,564 | Spanish Socialist Workers' Party (PSOE) | People's Party (PP) |
| Menorca | 96,467 | Spanish Socialist Workers' Party (PSOE) | People's Party (PP) |
| Tenerife | 931,646 | Spanish Socialist Workers' Party (PSOE) | Canarian Coalition (CCa) |

==== Foral deputations ====
The following table lists party control in the foral deputations. Gains for a party are highlighted in that party's colour.

| Province | Population | Previous control | New control |
|---|---|---|---|
| Álava | 334,412 | Basque Nationalist Party (EAJ/PNV) | Basque Nationalist Party (EAJ/PNV) |
| Biscay | 1,149,344 | Basque Nationalist Party (EAJ/PNV) | Basque Nationalist Party (EAJ/PNV) |
| Gipuzkoa | 724,418 | Basque Nationalist Party (EAJ/PNV) | Basque Nationalist Party (EAJ/PNV) |

== Aftermath ==
Immediately after the outcome of the elections, Prime Minister Pedro Sánchez announced a snap general election to be held on 23 July. Political parties from across the spectrum were caught by surprise, particularly the leaders of the opposition People's Party (PP), who were reportedly feeling upset over the election call preventing them from politically capitalizing on their local elections' gains.

== See also ==
- 2023 Aranese Council election

== Bibliography ==
- Constitución Española (Constitution). Official State Gazette (in Spanish). 27 December 1978 [version as of 27 September 2011]. BOE-A-1978-31229.
- Ley 27/1983, de 25 de noviembre, de Relaciones entre las Instituciones Comunes de la Comunidad Autónoma y los Órganos Forales de sus Territorios Históricos (Law 27/1983). Official State Gazette (in Spanish). 25 November 1983 [version as of 31 December 2021]. BOE-A-2012-5193.
- Ley 7/1985, de 2 de abril, Reguladora de las Bases del Régimen Local (Law 7/1985). Official State Gazette (in Spanish). 2 April 1985 [version as of 29 December 2021]. BOE-A-1985-5392.
- Ley Orgánica 5/1985, de 19 de junio, del Régimen Electoral General (Organic Law 5/1985). Official State Gazette (in Spanish). 19 June 1985 [version as of 3 October 2022]. BOE-A-1985-11672.
- Ley 8/1986, de 26 de noviembre, Electoral de la Comunidad Autónoma de las Islas Baleares (Law 8/1986). Official State Gazette (in Spanish). 26 November 1986 [version as of 2 February 2019]. BOE-A-1987-2903.
- Ley 1/1987, de 27 de marzo, de Elecciones para las Juntas Generales de los Territorios Históricos de Araba, Bizkaia y Gipuzkoa (Law 1/1987). Official State Gazette (in Spanish). 27 March 1987 [version as of 2 March 2005]. BOE-A-2012-3948.
- Ley 8/2000, de 27 de octubre, de Consejos Insulares (Law 8/2000). Official State Gazette (in Spanish). 27 October 2000 [version as of 7 July 2022]. BOE-A-2000-20977.
- Ley Orgánica 1/2007, de 28 de febrero, de reforma del Estatuto de Autonomía de las Illes Balears (Organic Law 1/2007). Official State Gazette (in Spanish). 28 February 2007 [version as of 28 December 2022]. BOE-A-2007-4233.
- Ley 7/2009, de 11 de diciembre, electoral de los Consejos Insulares (Law 7/2009). Official State Gazette (in Spanish). 11 December 2009 [version as of 22 December 2009]. BOE-A-2010-1399.
- Ley 8/2015, de 1 de abril, de Cabildos Insulares (Law 8/2015). Official State Gazette (in Spanish). 1 April 2015 [version as of 31 December 2022]. BOE-A-2015-4621.
- Ley Orgánica 1/2018, de 5 de noviembre, de reforma del Estatuto de Autonomía de Canarias (Organic Law 1/2018). Official State Gazette (in Spanish). 5 November 2018 [version as of 28 December 2022]. BOE-A-2018-15138.
- Real Decreto 207/2023, de 3 de abril, por el que se convocan elecciones locales y a las Asambleas de Ceuta y Melilla para el 28 de mayo de 2023 (Royal Decree 207/2023). Official State Gazette (in Spanish). 3 April 2023. BOE-A-2023-8458.
- Real Decreto 758/2023, de 2 de octubre, por el que se convocan elecciones locales parciales 2023 (Royal Decree 758/2023). Official State Gazette (in Spanish). 2 October 2023. BOE-A-2023-20501.
