= Opinion polling for the 2027 Spanish local elections (Basque Country) =

In the run up to the 2027 Spanish local elections, various organisations carry out opinion polling to gauge voting intention in local entities in Spain. Results of such polls for municipalities and the three foral deputations (General Assemblies) in the Basque Country are displayed in this article. The date range for these opinion polls is from the previous local elections, held on 28 May 2023, to the day the next elections will be held, on 23 May 2027.

Polls are listed in reverse chronological order, showing the most recent first and using the dates when the survey fieldwork was done, as opposed to the date of publication. Where the fieldwork dates are unknown, the date of publication is given instead. The highest percentage figure in each polling survey is displayed with its background shaded in the leading party's colour. If a tie ensues, this is applied to the figures with the highest percentages. The "Lead" columns on the right shows the percentage-point difference between the parties with the highest percentages in a given poll.

== Municipalities ==
=== Amorebieta-Etxano ===
Polling firm/Commissioner	Fieldwork date	Sample size	Turnout	PNV	EH Bildu	PSE–EE (PSOE)	Elkarrekin Podemos	PP	Lead
Gizaker/City Council	27–28 Oct 2025	400	67.0	42.7; 8	40.3; 7	9.4; 1	5.2; 1	2.4; 0	2.4
2023 municipal election	28 May 2023	—N/a	64.4	43.6; 8	38.8; 7	8.6; 1	5.2; 1	2.1; 0	4.8

=== Barakaldo ===
Polling firm/Commissioner	Fieldwork date	Sample size	Turnout	PNV	PSE–EE (PSOE)	EH Bildu	Elkarrekin Podemos	PP	Lead
Gizaker/City Council	18–22 Dec 2025	550	54.0	37.2; 11	22.6; 6/7	18.5; 5/6	7.7; 2	7.4; 2	14.6
2023 municipal election	28 May 2023	—N/a	56.0	36.0; 11	24.5; 7	15.9; 5	8.7; 2	7.2; 2	11.5

=== Bilbao ===
Polling firm/Commissioner	Fieldwork date	Sample size	Turnout	PNV	EH Bildu	PSE–EE (PSOE)	PP	Podemos	Vox	Sumar	Lead
Gizaker/City Council	26 Jun–2 Jul 2025	800	55.0	37.4; 12	21.9; 7	14.9; 4/5	10.9; 3	6.0; 1/2	5.2; 1	1.4; 0	15.5
2023 municipal election	28 May 2023	—N/a	56.2	36.6; 12	18.9; 6	16.4; 5	12.1; 4	8.0; 2	3.4; 0	–	17.7

=== Durango ===
Polling firm/Commissioner	Fieldwork date	Sample size	Turnout	EH Bildu	PNV	PSE–EE (PSOE)	SQ–2D	PP	Elkarrekin Podemos	Lead
Gizaker/City Council	9–12 Jun 2025	400	66.0	41.4; 9/10	34.9; 8/9	7.8; 1/2	6.3; 1	6.6; 1	3.0; 0	6.5
2023 municipal election	28 May 2023	—N/a	64.1	37.8; 9	35.4; 8	8.2; 2	6.6; 1	6.1; 1	4.5; 0	2.4

=== Erandio ===
Polling firm/Commissioner	Fieldwork date	Sample size	Turnout	PNV	EH Bildu	PSE–EE (PSOE)	Elkarrekin Podemos	PP	Lead
Gizaker/City Council	17–19 Jun 2025	600	58.5	32.9; 7/8	30.5; 7	19.3; 4	8.4; 1/2	6.1; 1	2.4
2023 municipal election	28 May 2023	—N/a	56.9	35.4; 8	24.9; 6	20.7; 4	9.0; 2	6.4; 1	10.5

=== Getxo ===
Polling firm/Commissioner	Fieldwork date	Sample size	Turnout	PNV	PP	EH Bildu	PSE–EE (PSOE)	Elkarrekin Podemos	Vox	Lead
Gizaker/City Council	19–27 Jun 2025	900	61.0	31.1; 9	21.9; 6	23.5; 7	9.7; 3	4.7; 0	3.3; 0	7.6
Ikerfel/City Council	Sep 2023	700	?	? 9	? 6	? 6	? 3	? 1	–	?
2023 municipal election	28 May 2023	—N/a	62.3	31.7; 9	21.7; 6	20.2; 6	10.3; 3	5.6; 1	3.4; 0	10.0

=== Leioa ===
Polling firm/Commissioner	Fieldwork date	Sample size	Turnout	PNV	EH Bildu	PSE–EE (PSOE)	PP	Elkarrekin Podemos	Vox	Lead
Gizaker/City Council	12–16 Jun 2025	600	64.0	40.0; 9	25.2; 5/6	12.6; 2/3	13.3; 3	7.3; 1	1.6; 0	14.8
2023 municipal election	28 May 2023	—N/a	57.3	38.3; 8	21.6; 5	15.1; 3	12.9; 3	9.7; 2	–	16.7

=== Santurtzi ===
Polling firm/Commissioner	Fieldwork date	Sample size	Turnout	PNV	EH Bildu	PSE–EE (PSOE)	Elkarrekin Podemos	PP	Vox	Lead
Gizaker/City Council	22–26 Jan 2026	400	57.0	30.0; 7	32.9; 7	20.3; 4	9.0; 2	5.3; 1	2.3; 0	2.9
2023 municipal election	28 May 2023	—N/a	57.9	32.2; 7	26.9; 6	23.0; 5	8.3; 2	5.7; 1	2.1; 0	5.3

=== Vitoria-Gasteiz ===
Polling firm/Commissioner	Fieldwork date	Sample size	Turnout	EH Bildu	PSE–EE (PSOE)	PP	PNV	Elkarrekin Podemos	Vox	Lead
Ikerfel/City Council	1–19 Dec 2025	1,306	57.0	26.6; 8	20.1; 6	18.1; 5	19.9; 6	4.4; 1	6.3; 1	6.5
2023 municipal election	28 May 2023	—N/a	58.1	22.8; 7	21.9; 6	20.1; 6	19.7; 6	7.1; 2	3.8; 0	0.9

== General Assemblies ==
=== Álava ===
Polling firm/Commissioner	Fieldwork date	Sample size	Turnout	PNV	EH Bildu	PSE–EE (PSOE)	PP	Podemos	Vox	Sumar	Lead
Ikerfel/GPS	20–26 May 2026	800	59.2	28.5	28.2	15.8	15.0	1.7	5.9	2.2	0.3
Gizaker/Álava Deputation	15–20 May 2026	1,200	61.9	29.4; 17	28.0; 15	15.4; 7	15.5; 9	1.9; 0	4.5; 2	3.3; 1	1.4
Gizaker/EiTB	17 Apr–13 May 2026	950	?	28.6	27.9	16.4	14.9	2.6	4.6	2.9	0.7
Gizaker/Álava Deputation	12–18 Dec 2025	1,200	60.5	30.0; 17	28.4; 16	15.5; 7	13.1; 7	5.6; 2	5.0; 2	–	1.6
Gizaker/Álava Deputation	1–4 Apr 2025	1,100	59.7	27.9; 16	25.8; 14	18.4; 9	15.1; 8	5.5; 2	4.3; 2	–	2.1
2024 EP election	9 Jun 2024	—N/a	48.4	15.2	21.4	28.8	17.6	3.6	3.9	3.8	7.4
2024 regional election	21 Apr 2024	—N/a	59.4	26.7	29.1	16.2	15.9	2.4	3.7	3.7	2.4
2023 general election	23 Jul 2023	—N/a	65.5	16.6	19.5	27.7	17.9	(Note: Within Sumar.)	3.9	12.7	8.2
2023 foral election	28 May 2023	—N/a	60.1	25.9; 15	25.1; 14	18.5; 9	16.0; 9	7.0; 3	3.0; 1	–	0.8

=== Biscay ===
Polling firm/Commissioner	Fieldwork date	Sample size	Turnout	PNV	EH Bildu	PSE–EE (PSOE)	PP	Podemos	Vox	Sumar	Lead
Ikerfel/GPS	20–26 May 2026	1,485	59.3	39.4	29.0	14.9	6.8	1.7	3.1	1.9	10.4
Gizaker/EiTB	17 Apr–13 May 2026	1,500	?	39.2	29.6	14.0	6.6	3.1	2.6	3.5	9.6
Ikerfel/Biscay Deputation	3–18 Dec 2025	3,002	60.5	41.6; 24/25	29.3; 17	14.3; 7/8	6.6; 2/3	2.0; 0	2.7; 0	2.2; 0	12.3
Ikerfel/Biscay Deputation	11 Jun–7 Jul 2025	3,000	60.2	40.7; 24	28.9; 16/17	14.1; 7	7.9; 3/4	1.9; 0	2.6; 0	2.3; 0	11.8
Ikerfel/Biscay Deputation	18 Jun–6 Jul 2024	3,063	60.9	41.0; 23/25	28.3; 15/17	13.8; 7/8	8.2; 3/4	3.4; 0	1.9; 0	2.0; 0	12.7
2024 EP election	9 Jun 2024	—N/a	49.5	25.5	22.7	26.5	11.7	3.2	2.7	3.3	1.0
2024 regional election	21 Apr 2024	—N/a	60.8	39.1	28.3	13.9	9.0	2.2	1.9	3.3	10.8
2023 general election	23 Jul 2023	—N/a	65.2	26.9	20.6	25.8	11.6		2.6	10.9	1.1
2023 foral election	28 May 2023	—N/a	60.1	38.4; 23	25.0; 15	15.9; 8	8.2; 3	7.3; 2	2.0; 0	–	13.4

=== Gipuzkoa ===
Polling firm/Commissioner	Fieldwork date	Sample size	Turnout	EH Bildu	PNV	PSE–EE (PSOE)	Podemos	PP	Sumar	Vox	Lead
Gizaker/Gipuzkoa Deputation	25 Jun–1 Jul 2026	1,500	60.2	39.9; 23	32.9; 19	14.1; 7	5.2; 1	5.0; 1	–	1.2; 0	7.0
Ikerfel/GPS	20–26 May 2026	1,200	59.5	39.6	33.4	13.1	2.0	6.1	1.3	1.5	6.2
Gizaker/EiTB	17 Apr–13 May 2026	1,200	?	39.7	33.7	14.5	2.1	5.3	2.3	1.7	6.0
Gizaker/Gipuzkoa Deputation	3–10 Dec 2025	1,500	58.0	39.4; 23	32.9; 18	13.9; 7	4.8; 1	5.5; 2	–	–	6.5
Gizaker/Gipuzkoa Deputation	22–28 May 2025	1,500	59.7	40.0; 23	31.9; 17	15.1; 7	4.8; 1	6.0; 3	–	–	8.1
Gizaker/Gipuzkoa Deputation	5–12 Dec 2024	1,500	58.6	39.4; 22	33.0; 18	14.6; 7	4.8; 1	6.2; 3	–	–	6.4
2024 EP election	9 Jun 2024	—N/a	47.9	34.4	20.6	24.0	3.0	8.7	3.0	2.1	10.4
2024 regional election	21 Apr 2024	—N/a	59.0	39.8	31.4	13.4	2.2	6.4	3.1	1.5	8.4
2023 general election	23 Jul 2023	—N/a	64.5	31.2	22.6	23.3		8.7	10.6	2.1	7.9
2023 foral election	28 May 2023	—N/a	60.1	36.6; 22	32.0; 17	15.7; 7	6.5; 2	6.3; 3	–	–	4.6
