= Opinion polling for the 2023 Spanish local elections (Basque Country) =

In the run up to the 2023 Spanish local elections, various organisations carried out opinion polling to gauge voting intention in local entities in Spain. Results of such polls for municipalities and the three foral deputations (General Assemblies) in the Basque Country are displayed in this article. The date range for these opinion polls is from the previous local elections, held on 26 May 2019, to the day the next elections were held, on 28 May 2023.

Polls are listed in reverse chronological order, showing the most recent first and using the dates when the survey fieldwork was done, as opposed to the date of publication. Where the fieldwork dates are unknown, the date of publication is given instead. The highest percentage figure in each polling survey is displayed with its background shaded in the leading party's colour. If a tie ensues, this is applied to the figures with the highest percentages. The "Lead" columns on the right shows the percentage-point difference between the parties with the highest percentages in a given poll.

== Municipalities ==
=== Barakaldo ===
Polling firm/Commissioner	Fieldwork date	Sample size	Turnout	PNV	PSE–EE (PSOE)	Elkarrekin Podemos	EH Bildu	PP	CS	Vox	Lead
2023 municipal election	28 May 2023	—N/a	56.0	36.0; 11	24.5; 7	8.7; 2	15.9; 5	7.2; 2	–	2.9; 0	11.5
Gizaker/EiTB	26 Apr–12 May 2023	400	61.0	42.1; 12	24.9; 7	10.8; 3	13.6; 4	5.2; 1	–	–	17.2
Gizaker/EiTB	27 Feb–17 Mar 2023	400	59.0	40.8; 12	26.2; 8	9.7; 2	13.2; 4	5.4; 1	–	2.7; 0	14.6
Gizaker/Inguralde	12–16 Dec 2022	700	61.0	39.0; 11/12	26.2; 8	13.1; 3/4	12.6; 3	6.2; 1	1.1; 0	0.9; 0	12.8
2019 municipal election	26 May 2019	—N/a	62.5	38.6; 11	27.0; 8	13.2; 4	11.5; 3	5.7; 1	1.5; 0	1.1; 0	11.6

=== Basauri ===
Polling firm/Commissioner	Fieldwork date	Sample size	Turnout	PNV	PSE–EE (PSOE)	EH Bildu	Elkarrekin Podemos	PP	Vox	Lead
2023 municipal election	28 May 2023	—N/a	55.7	39.3; 9	22.6; 5	19.6; 4	8.1; 2	7.5; 1	–	16.7
Gizaker/EiTB	26 Apr–12 May 2023	400	62.0	45.0; 10/11	21.8; 5	16.4; 3/4	8.5; 1/2	5.0; 1	–	23.2
Gizaker/EiTB	27 Feb–17 Mar 2023	400	63.0	45.7; 10/11	21.5; 5	15.1; 3	9.3; 2	5.0; 0/1	–	24.2
2019 municipal election	26 May 2019	—N/a	62.9	43.1; 10	22.7; 5	13.3; 3	10.7; 2	5.4; 1	0.8; 0	20.4

=== Bilbao ===
Color key:

Poll conducted after legal ban on opinion polls

Polling firm/Commissioner	Fieldwork date	Sample size	Turnout	PNV	PSE–EE (PSOE)	EH Bildu	Elkarrekin Podemos	PP	CS	Vox	PP+Cs	Lead
2023 municipal election	28 May 2023	—N/a	56.2	36.6; 12	16.4; 5	18.9; 6	8.0; 2	12.1; 4	0.2; 0	3.4; 0	–	17.7
Sigma Dos/EiTB	25–28 May 2023	700	?	42.4; 13/14	16.3; 5	17.5; 5	9.7; 2/3	10.2; 3	–	–	–	24.9
NC Report/La Razón	22 May 2023	?	?	42.9; 14	14.9; 5	16.2; 5	7.9; 2	10.9; 3	–	–	–	26.7
Gizaker/EiTB	26 Apr–12 May 2023	400	60.0	45.2; 14	15.5; 5	17.3; 5	7.1; 2	9.4; 3	–	2.5; 0	–	27.9
Ikerfel/El Correo	25 Apr–12 May 2023	?	?	43.9; 14	15.8; 5	16.8; 5	10.3; 3	8.6; 2	–	1.8; 0	–	27.1
Ikerfel/GPS	2–5 May 2023	?	59.5	44.3; 14	15.5; 5	16.0; 5	8.0; 2	8.9; 3	–	2.9; 0	–	28.3
CIS	10–26 Apr 2023	601	?	36.4; 11/13	17.0; 5/6	19.7; 5/7	9.9; 2/3	9.2; 2/3	0.7; 0	4.1; 0/1	–	16.7
NC Report/La Razón	24 Apr 2023	?	62.8	41.1; 13	15.6; 5	15.5; 5	9.5; 3	11.3; 3	–	–	–	25.5
EM-Analytics/Crónica Vasca	19 Sep–4 Apr 2023	1,501	?	43.8; 14	15.3; 4	15.8; 5	9.9; 3	10.3; 3	1.2; 0	2.1; 0	-	28.0
Gizaker/EiTB	27 Feb–17 Mar 2023	400	60.0	44.0; 14	14.7; 5	17.1; 5	9.9; 3	7.9; 2	–	3.2; 0	–	26.9
Sigma Dos/El Mundo	3–8 Mar 2023	629	?	41.6; 13/14	16.9; 5	15.5; 5	9.7; 3	9.2; 2/3	–	–	–	24.7
Ikerfel/GPS	31 Jan–6 Feb 2023	?	58.5	45.7; 15	15.9; 5	14.7; 5	7.9; 2	8.8; 2	–	2.2; 0	–	29.8
Ikerfel/GPS	3–7 Oct 2022	?	59.0	44.3; 15	15.2; 5	16.4; 5	8.5; 2	8.7; 2	–	2.0; 0	–	27.9
EM-Analytics/Crónica Vasca	10 May–18 Sep 2022	1,008	?	40.2; 13	15.7; 5	15.5; 5	11.0; 3	(Note: Within PP+Cs.)		2.0; 0	12.1; 3	24.5
Ikerfel/GPS	6–10 Jun 2022	443	58.5	44.7; 14	15.9; 5	15.4; 5	8.8; 2	9.0; 3	–	2.7; 0	–	28.8
EM-Analytics/Crónica Vasca	2–19 May 2022	757	?	40.8; 13	15.7; 5	15.2; 5	10.7; 3			1.9; 0	12.3; 3	25.1
Gizaker/EiTB	5–12 May 2022	400	?	46.7; 15	15.0; 5	14.9; 4	9.5; 3	8.0; 2	0.5; 0	3.0; 0	–	31.7
Gizaker/City Council of Bilbao	19–26 May 2021	1,000	61.0	43.0; 14	15.7; 5	17.1; 5	8.8; 2	9.5; 3	–	2.7; 0	–	25.9
2019 municipal election	26 May 2019	—N/a	61.8	42.7; 14	15.9; 5	14.9; 4	10.5; 3	9.2; 3	2.2; 0	1.1; 0	–	26.8

=== Donostia-San Sebastián ===
Color key:

Poll conducted after legal ban on opinion polls

Polling firm/Commissioner	Fieldwork date	Sample size	Turnout	PNV	EH Bildu	PSE–EE (PSOE)	PP	Elkarrekin Podemos	CS	Vox	Lead
2023 municipal election	28 May 2023	—N/a	59.9	27.9; 9	26.7; 8	18.6; 5	12.1; 3	8.1; 2	0.2; 0	2.4; 0	1.2
Sigma Dos/EiTB	25–28 May 2023	700	?	33.0; 9/10	27.5; 8/9	16.8; 5	8.8; 2	9.8; 2/3	–	–	5.5
Gizaker/EiTB	26 Apr–12 May 2023	400	63.0	32.9; 10	25.2; 7	17.7; 5	10.4; 3	9.2; 2	–	1.5; 0	7.7
Ikerfel/Diario Vasco	25 Apr–12 May 2023	400	60.3	32.3; 9/10	26.4; 7/8	18.1; 5	10.6; 3	9.6; 2/3	–	1.7; 0	5.9
Ikerfel/GPS	2–5 May 2023	?	61.0	33.9; 10	25.2; 7	16.5; 5	9.5; 3	8.4; 2	–	2.5; 0	8.7
Gizaker/EiTB	27 Feb–17 Mar 2023	400	64.0	36.3; 11	24.1; 7	17.4; 5	9.1; 2	9.7; 2	–	0.8; 0	12.2
Ikerfel/GPS	31 Jan–6 Feb 2023	?	60.5	34.3; 10	24.3; 7	17.6; 5	9.7; 3	8.1; 2	–	2.2; 0	10.0
Ikerfel/GPS	3–7 Oct 2022	?	59.5	33.8; 10	21.7; 6	21.5; 6	9.4; 3	7.9; 2	–	2.2; 0	12.1
Ikerfel/GPS	6–10 Jun 2022	400	59.0	37.1; 11	22.7; 7	17.2; 5	9.2; 2	7.9; 2	–	2.1; 0	14.4
Gizaker/EiTB	5–12 May 2022	400	?	37.3; 11	24.7; 7	16.5; 5	8.6; 2	8.0; 2	1.0; 0	1.8; 0	12.6
ElectoPanel/Electomanía	1 Apr–15 Jun 2020	?	?	30.4; 9	24.9; 7	20.1; 6	12.1; 3	7.5; 2	–	–	5.5
2019 municipal election	26 May 2019	—N/a	65.3	35.5; 10	21.2; 6	17.5; 5	10.8; 3	9.9; 3	1.6; 0	1.3; 0	14.3

=== Durango ===
Polling firm/Commissioner	Fieldwork date	Sample size	Turnout	PNV	EH Bildu	Elkarrekin Podemos	PSE–EE (PSOE)	PP	HE	Lead
2023 municipal election	28 May 2023	—N/a	64.1	35.4; 8	37.8; 9	4.5; 0	8.2; 2	6.1; 1	6.6; 1	2.4
Aztiker/City Council of Durango	16–27 Jan 2023	614	64.6	36.7; 8/9	33.0; 7/8	12.1; 2/3	9.4; 2	5.0; 0/1	–	3.7
2019 municipal election	26 May 2019	—N/a	68.2	35.3; 8	32.3; 7	16.3; 4	10.0; 2	4.5; 0	–	3.0

=== Eibar ===
Polling firm/Commissioner	Fieldwork date	Sample size	Turnout	PSE–EE (PSOE)	PNV	EH Bildu	Elkarrekin Podemos	PP	Lead
2023 municipal election	28 May 2023	—N/a	60.3	36.4; 8	25.7; 6	26.8; 6	5.4; 1	3.9; 0	9.6
Gizaker/EiTB	26 Apr–12 May 2023	400	63.0	35.9; 8	28.6; 6/7	27.3; 6/7	4.1; 0	3.5; 0	7.3
Gizaker/EiTB	27 Feb–17 Mar 2023	400	65.0	35.3; 8	28.7; 6/7	24.9; 5/6	6.2; 1	4.0; 0	6.6
2019 municipal election	26 May 2019	—N/a	67.5	39.2; 9	25.9; 6	24.0; 5	6.6; 1	3.5; 0	13.3

=== Getxo ===
Polling firm/Commissioner	Fieldwork date	Sample size	Turnout	PNV	PP	EH Bildu	PSE–EE (PSOE)	Elkarrekin Podemos	CS	Vox	Lead
2023 municipal election	28 May 2023	—N/a	62.3	31.7; 9	21.7; 6	20.2; 6	10.3; 3	5.6; 1	–	3.4; 0	10.0
Gizaker/EiTB	26 Apr–12 May 2023	400	62.0	40.2; 11/12	15.8; 4	20.1; 5/6	9.2; 2	7.4; 2	–	2.7; 0	20.1
Gizaker/EiTB	27 Feb–17 Mar 2023	400	65.0	38.6; 11	14.1; 4	18.2; 5	10.9; 3	7.7; 2	–	4.2; 0	20.4
2019 municipal election	26 May 2019	—N/a	67.5	39.1; 11	16.4; 5	15.1; 4	10.6; 3	8.0; 2	3.2; 0	1.6; 0	22.7

=== Irun ===
Polling firm/Commissioner	Fieldwork date	Sample size	Turnout	PSE–EE (PSOE)	PNV	Elkarrekin Podemos	EH Bildu	PP	CS	Vox	Lead
2023 municipal election	28 May 2023	—N/a	54.1	32.7; 10	23.0; 7	9.2; 2	16.1; 4	8.5; 2	–	4.1; 0	9.7
Gizaker/EiTB	26 Apr–12 May 2023	400	61.0	32.7; 8/9	26.6; 7/8	13.3; 3/4	19.3; 5	6.3; 1	–	–	6.1
Ikerfel/Diario Vasco	25 Apr–12 May 2023	400	59.0	32.4; 9	26.1; 7	14.7; 4	16.1; 4	6.3; 1	–	2.6; 0	6.3
Gizaker/EiTB	27 Feb–17 Mar 2023	400	60.0	31.9; 8/9	28.3; 7/8	12.0; 3	18.6; 5	6.7; 1	–	1.7; 0	3.6
2019 municipal election	26 May 2019	—N/a	60.8	35.7; 10	24.8; 7	15.4; 4	13.8; 3	5.5; 1	2.3; 0	1.6; 0	10.9

=== Llodio ===
Polling firm/Commissioner	Fieldwork date	Sample size	Turnout	PNV	EH Bildu	Omnia	PSE–EE (PSOE)	Elkarrekin Podemos	PP	Vox	Lead
2023 municipal election	28 May 2023	—N/a	63.5	33.8; 6	34.1; 7	15.1; 3	9.6; 1	–	4.2; 0	1.6; 0	0.3
Gizaker/EiTB	26 Apr–12 May 2023	400	64.0	33.9; 7	31.3; 6	16.5; 3	9.3; 1	4.7; 0	3.4; 0	–	2.6
Gizaker/EiTB	27 Feb–17 Mar 2023	400	66.0	33.2; 6/7	27.8; 5/6	18.4; 3	10.1; 2	3.9; 0	4.5; 0	–	5.4
2019 municipal election	26 May 2019	—N/a	67.8	36.2; 7	24.7; 5	18.2; 3	10.4; 2	4.7; 0	4.4; 0	0.7; 0	11.5

=== Salvatierra-Agurain ===
Polling firm/Commissioner	Fieldwork date	Sample size	Turnout	PNV	EH Bildu	PSE–EE (PSOE)	Elkarrekin Podemos	PP	Vox	Lead
2023 municipal election	28 May 2023	—N/a	66.2	46.2; 6	48.6; 7	3.1; 0	0.9; 0	–	–	2.4
Gizaker/EiTB	26 Apr–12 May 2023	200	68.0	42.9; 6	46.7; 7	5.2; 0	3.0; 0	–	–	3.8
Gizaker/EiTB	27 Feb–17 Mar 2023	200	69.0	45.5; 6/7	45.8; 6/7	3.6; 0	2.6; 0	1.1; 0	1.4; 0	0.3
2019 municipal election	26 May 2019	—N/a	67.5	45.6; 7	44.9; 6	4.4; 0	3.2; 0	1.0; 0	–	0.7

=== Tolosa ===
Polling firm/Commissioner	Fieldwork date	Sample size	Turnout	PNV	EH Bildu	PSE–EE (PSOE)	Elkarrekin Podemos	PP	Lead
2023 municipal election	28 May 2023	—N/a	63.3	36.6; 7	49.2; 9	7.5; 1	3.1; 0	1.9; 0	12.6
Gizaker/EiTB	26 Apr–12 May 2023	400	64.0	39.5; 7	48.6; 9	6.1; 1	3.9; 0	1.2; 0	9.1
Gizaker/EiTB	27 Feb–17 Mar 2023	400	70.0	41.3; 8	42.7; 8	8.2; 1	4.7; 0	1.8; 0	1.4
2019 municipal election	26 May 2019	—N/a	68.8	43.4; 8	41.3; 8	7.2; 1	5.2; 0	2.1; 0	2.1

=== Vitoria-Gasteiz ===
Color key:

Poll conducted after legal ban on opinion polls

Polling firm/Commissioner	Fieldwork date	Sample size	Turnout	PNV	PSE–EE (PSOE)	EH Bildu	PP	Elkarrekin Podemos	CS	Vox	Lead
2023 municipal election	28 May 2023	—N/a	58.1	19.7; 6	21.9; 6	22.8; 7	20.1; 6	7.1; 2	0.2; 0	3.8; 0	0.9
Sigma Dos/EiTB	25–28 May 2023	700	?	23.7; 7	22.2; 6/7	24.4; 7	19.4; 5/6	6.7; 1/2	–	–	0.7
Gizaker/EiTB	26 Apr–12 May 2023	400	61.0	25.2; 7/8	19.4; 5/6	23.9; 7	19.1; 5/6	7.8; 2	–	2.1; 0	1.3
Ikerfel/El Correo	25 Apr–12 May 2023	?	?	22.5; 6/7	22.2; 6	20.3; 6	19.5; 5/6	10.8; 3	–	2.3; 0	0.3
Ikerfel/GPS	2–5 May 2023	?	60.0	23.8; 7	21.2; 6	22.7; 7	18.5; 5	7.3; 2	–	3.2; 0	1.1
Gizaker/City Council of Vitoria	23–24 Mar 2023	1,150	?	? 7/8	? 5/6	? 6/7	? 5	? 2/3	–	–	?
Gizaker/EiTB	27 Feb–17 Mar 2023	400	61.0	25.6; 7/8	19.2; 5/6	22.3; 6/7	18.3; 5	10.0; 2/3	–	2.8; 0	3.3
PP	14 Mar 2023	?	?	? 6	? 5/6	? 6/7	? 7	? 1/2	–	–	?
Ikerfel/GPS	31 Jan–6 Feb 2023	?	60.0	24.3; 7	20.9; 6	21.6; 7	18.1; 5	6.8; 2	–	4.0; 0	2.7
EM-Analytics/Crónica Vasca	8 Dec–4 Feb 2023	1,647	?	25.8; 8	22.5; 6	23.6; 7	17.0; 5	6.1; 1	0.8; 0	3.8; 0	2.2
Gizaker/Grupo Noticias	13–16 Dec 2022	800	?	26.6; 8	19.4; 5	22.5; 7	? 5	? 2	? 0	? 0	4.1
EM-Analytics/Crónica Vasca	16 Jul–7 Dec 2022	1,257	?	25.6; 7	22.8; 7	23.4; 7	16.9; 5	6.1; 1	1.0; 0	4.1; 0	2.2
Ikerfel/GPS	3–7 Oct 2022	?	60.0	24.2; 7	21.5; 7	21.3; 6	18.2; 5	7.1; 2	–	3.4; 0	2.7
EM-Analytics/Crónica Vasca	2–15 Jun 2022	770	?	25.5; 7	22.3; 7	22.8; 6	? 5	6.8; 2	1.0; 0	3.9; 0	2.7
Ikerfel/GPS	6–10 Jun 2022	601	59.5	24.3; 7	20.4; 6	22.0; 7	18.0; 5	7.3; 2	–	4.6; 0	2.3
Gizaker/EiTB	5–12 May 2022	400	?	24.5; 7	21.0; 6	22.6; 7	17.7; 5	8.0; 2	1.3; 0	3.9; 0	1.9
EM-Analytics/Electomanía	13 May-8 Oct 2021	361	?	24.9; 7	22.0; 6	22.1; 7	16.4; 5	7.7; 2	1.1; 0	3.6; 0	2.8
Gizaker/City Council of Vitoria	7-11 Jun 2021	1,150	?	? 8	? 6	? 7	? 4	? 2	–	–	?
2019 municipal election	26 May 2019	—N/a	63.3	23.6; 7	21.4; 6	20.1; 6	18.5; 5	9.9; 3	2.5; 0	1.4; 0	3.1

== General Assemblies ==
=== Álava ===
Polling firm/Commissioner	Fieldwork date	Sample size	Turnout	PNV	EH Bildu	PSE–EE (PSOE)	PP	Elkarrekin Podemos	CS	Vox	PP+Cs	Lead
2023 foral election	28 May 2023	—N/a	59.6	25.9; 15	25.1; 14	18.4; 9	17.0; 9	7.0; 3	–	3.0; 1	–	0.8
Gizaker/EiTB	26 Apr–12 May 2023	1,543	61.9	30.8; 17/18	24.4; 13	16.6; 9	15.4; 8	8.8; 3/4	–	1.7; 0	–	6.4
Ikerfel/El Correo	25 Apr–12 May 2023	2,850	68.3	31.1; 16/18	21.0; 11/13	19.1; 10/11	15.3; 8	9.2; 3/4	–	2.7; 0/1	–	10.1
Ikerfel/GPS	2–5 May 2023	728	60.5	31.0	22.2	18.2	15.4	7.1	–	3.0	–	8.8
Aztiker/Gara	11–25 Apr 2023	500	?	28.5; 16	22.5; 12	18.1; 10	14.4; 8	7.8; 3	–	5.1; 2	–	6.0
Gizaker/EiTB	27 Feb–17 Mar 2023	1,543	62.5	31.7; 18/19	23.6; 13	18.0; 9/10	13.8; 7/8	8.6; 3	–	2.4; 0/1	–	8.1
Ikerfel/Álava Deputation	26 Feb–15 Mar 2023	1,200	57.7	31.3; 18/19	24.2; 13/14	17.2; 8/9	13.9; 7/8	7.4; 2/3	–	2.9; 0/1	–	7.1
Aztiker/Gara	14–25 Feb 2023	500	?	28.8; 16	22.2; 12	18.1; 10	14.2; 8	7.5; 3	–	5.1; 2	–	6.6
Ikerfel/GPS	31 Jan–6 Feb 2023	728	58.5	31.5	22.8	18.0	15.0	6.6	–	3.1	–	8.7
Ikerfel/GPS	13–20 Oct 2022	1,204	55.2	31.5; 18	23.1; 12/13	18.0; 8/10	15.1; 7/8	7.8; 3	–	2.4; 0/1	–	8.4
Ikerfel/GPS	3–7 Oct 2022	800	59.5	30.5	23.2	18.8	14.0	6.7	–	3.0	–	7.3
Ikerfel/GPS	6–10 Jun 2022	800	58.5	31.6	23.3	17.0	14.0	6.8	–	3.4	–	8.3
Gizaker/EiTB	5–12 May 2022	550	?	32.0	23.0	18.1	14.2	7.3	0.6	2.8	–	9.0
2020 regional election	12 Jul 2020	—N/a	49.0	31.9	24.6	15.5		8.0		3.8	11.4	7.3
November 2019 general election	10 Nov 2019	—N/a	66.6	23.6	16.1	21.9	14.9	16.5	1.5	3.8	–	2.7
2019 foral election	26 May 2019	—N/a	65.3	29.4; 17	21.0; 12	18.9; 10	15.0; 8	9.9; 4	2.3; 0	1.4; 0	–	8.4

=== Biscay ===
Polling firm/Commissioner	Fieldwork date	Sample size	Turnout	PNV	EH Bildu	PSE–EE (PSOE)	Elkarrekin Podemos	PP	CS	Vox	PP+Cs	Lead
2023 foral election	28 May 2023	—N/a	60.1	38.4; 23	25.0; 15	15.9; 8	7.3; 2	8.2; 3	–	2.0; 0	–	13.4
Gizaker/EiTB	26 Apr–12 May 2023	2,483	61.8	44.3; 25/26	21.8; 11/12	15.9; 8	8.4; 4	6.7; 2	–	1.8; 0	–	22.5
Ikerfel/El Correo	25 Apr–12 May 2023	2,850	63.9	43.4; 25/26	21.1; 10/12	17.1; 8/9	8.9; 4	7.0; 1/3	–	1.1; 0	–	22.3
Ikerfel/GPS	2–5 May 2023	1,318	62.5	44.2	22.0	15.4	7.0	6.8	–	1.7	–	22.2
Gizaker/Biscay Deputation	17–25 Apr 2023	3,000	65.1	43.4; 25/26	22.1; 12/13	15.3; 8	9.8; 4	6.2; 1	–	2.0; 0	–	21.3
Aztiker/Gara	11–25 Apr 2023	500	?	42.4; 25	21.5; 12	16.1; 9	8.4; 3	6.5; 2	–	2.6; 0	–	20.9
Gizaker/EiTB	27 Feb–17 Mar 2023	2,483	66.7	45.4; 26	22.6; 12	15.3; 8	8.4; 4	5.2; 1	–	1.9; 0	–	22.8
Aztiker/Gara	14–25 Feb 2023	500	?	42.9; 26	21.3; 11	16.1; 9	8.1; 4	6.4; 1	–	2.5; 0	–	21.6
Ikerfel/GPS	31 Jan–6 Feb 2023	1,318	59.5	44.6	22.2	15.7	7.3	7.2	–	1.4	–	22.4
Ikerfel/GPS	3–7 Oct 2022	1,449	60.5	44.4	22.4	14.4	8.2	7.1	–	1.2	–	22.0
Gizaker/Biscay Deputation	8–22 Jun 2022	3,000	64.7	44.5; 25/26	21.5; 12	15.3; 8	8.9; 3/4	6.5; 2	1.0; 0	1.5; 0	–	23.0
Ikerfel/GPS	6–10 Jun 2022	1,449	59.5	44.6	22.3	14.7	7.8	7.3	–	1.7	–	22.3
Gizaker/EiTB	5–12 May 2022	600	?	45.7	22.2	15.1	7.6	6.6	0.8	1.5	–	23.5
Ikerfel/Biscay Deputation	8–29 Dec 2021	2,503	55.4	44.6; 25/26	21.9; 12/13	14.8; 8	8.3; 4	6.6; 1	0.8; 0	1.9; 0	–	22.7
Gizaker/Biscay Deputation	16–30 Jun 2021	3,000	60.7	45.5; 26	21.0; 11	15.0; 8	9.1; 4	6.4; 2	1.1; 0	1.0; 0	–	24.5
2020 regional election	12 Jul 2020	—N/a	50.4	42.2	23.7	13.5	8.5			1.9	6.8	18.5
November 2019 general election	10 Nov 2019	—N/a	66.8	35.2	15.0	19.1	15.4	8.8	1.1	2.4	–	16.1
2019 foral election	26 May 2019	—N/a	65.7	43.1; 25	19.7; 10	16.5; 8	10.5; 6	6.6; 2	1.2; 0	0.9; 0	–	23.4

=== Gipuzkoa ===
Polling firm/Commissioner	Fieldwork date	Sample size	Turnout	PNV	EH Bildu	PSE–EE (PSOE)	Elkarrekin Podemos	PP	CS	Vox	PP+Cs	Lead
2023 foral election	28 May 2023	—N/a	59.9	32.0; 17	36.6; 22	15.6; 7	6.5; 2	6.3; 3	–	–	–	4.6
Gizaker/EiTB	26 Apr–12 May 2023	2,623	64.0	36.9; 21/22	35.3; 19/20	14.9; 7	7.0; 2	4.4; 1	–	1.2; 0	–	1.6
Ikerfel/El Correo	25 Apr–12 May 2023	2,850	65.2	35.2; 19/21	33.5; 18/19	17.1; 8/9	8.9; 2/4	4.9; 1	–	–	–	1.7
Ikerfel/GPS	2–5 May 2023	984	63.0	35.9	33.1	16.4	7.1	4.9	–	–	–	0.5
Aztiker/Gara	11–25 Apr 2023	500	?	34.4; 20	33.9; 19	16.4; 9	7.0; 2	4.5; 1	–	1.9; 0	–	0.5
Gizaker/Gipuzkoa Deputation	27–31 Mar 2023	1,200	65.1	36.2; 20/22	34.0; 19	15.9; 7/8	7.3; 2/3	4.6; 1	–	1.1; 0	–	2.2
Gizaker/EiTB	27 Feb–17 Mar 2023	2,623	67.2	37.1; 21	33.1; 18	15.9; 9	7.8; 2	4.2; 1	–	1.4; 0	–	4.0
Aztiker/Gara	14–25 Feb 2023	500	?	34.9; 20	33.6; 19	16.5; 9	6.8; 2	4.5; 1	–	1.8; 0	–	1.3
Ikerfel/GPS	31 Jan–6 Feb 2023	984	59.0	36.2	32.7	16.0	7.1	4.8	–	1.3	–	3.5
Gizaker/Gipuzkoa Deputation	1–12 Dec 2022	1,200	64.9	36.7; 21	34.0; 19	16.0; 8	7.3; 2	3.9; 1	–	1.2; 0	–	2.7
Ikerfel/GPS	3–7 Oct 2022	1,084	59.5	36.3	33.0	16.6	7.0	4.4	–	1.0	–	3.3
Ikerfel/GPS	6–10 Jun 2022	1,084	60.0	36.4	33.5	15.9	7.0	4.7	–	1.1	–	2.9
Gizaker/Gipuzkoa Deputation	16–24 May 2022	1,200	64.1	37.0; 21	33.2; 19	15.5; 7	8.3; 3	4.0; 1	–	1.0; 0	–	3.8
Gizaker/EiTB	5–12 May 2022	600	?	36.3	33.8	16.7	7.4	4.6	0.8	0.1	–	2.5
Gizaker/Gipuzkoa Deputation	19–24 Nov 2021	1,200	63.9	36.9; 21	34.5; 19	15.2; 8	8.0; 2	4.8; 1	–	1.0; 0	–	2.4
Gizaker/Gipuzkoa Deputation	26–29 Apr 2021	1,200	63.2	37.5; 21	33.2; 19	16.3; 8	7.7; 2	4.1; 1	–	0.9; 0	–	4.3
Gizaker/Gipuzkoa Deputation	24 Nov–1 Dec 2020	1,200	?	36.9; 21	33.5; 19	15.0; 7	8.6; 3	3.8; 1	0.8; 0	–	–	3.4
2020 regional election	12 Jul 2020	—N/a	52.2	36.1	34.9	12.8	7.1			1.3	4.6	1.2
Gizaker/Gipuzkoa Deputation	11–20 May 2020	850	63.0	34.2	31.4	18.5	8.8	5.5	0.5	–	–	2.8
November 2019 general election	10 Nov 2019	—N/a	65.8	30.5	25.8	18.1	15.0	6.2	1.9	1.0	–	4.7
2019 foral election	26 May 2019	—N/a	66.7	35.6; 20	31.6; 17	17.1; 9	8.9; 4	4.7; 1	1.0; 0	–	–	4.0
