= Opinion polling for the 2023 Spanish local elections (Galicia) =

In the run up to the 2023 Spanish local elections, various organisations carried out opinion polling to gauge voting intention in local entities in Spain. Results of such polls for municipalities in Galicia are displayed in this article. The date range for these opinion polls is from the previous local elections, held on 26 May 2019, to the day the next elections were held, on 28 May 2023.

Polls are listed in reverse chronological order, showing the most recent first and using the dates when the survey fieldwork was done, as opposed to the date of publication. Where the fieldwork dates are unknown, the date of publication is given instead. The highest percentage figure in each polling survey is displayed with its background shaded in the leading party's colour. If a tie ensues, this is applied to the figures with the highest percentages. The "Lead" columns on the right shows the percentage-point difference between the parties with the highest percentages in a given poll.

== Municipalities ==
=== A Coruña ===
Color key:

Poll conducted after legal ban on opinion polls

Polling firm/Commissioner	Fieldwork date	Sample size	Turnout	PP	PSdeG–PSOE	Marea Atlántica	BNG	CS	Vox	GeC	Marea Galeguista	Lead
2023 municipal election	28 May 2023	—N/a	59.0	36.5; 12	31.4; 11	4.9; 0	13.7; 4	0.4; 0	3.9; 0	4.2; 0	–	5.1
GAD3/RTVE–FORTA	12–27 May 2023	?	?	? 11	? 10	? 2	? 4	–	–	–	–	?
Sondaxe/La Voz de Galicia	23–26 May 2023	300	?	? 10	? 10	? 2	? 4	–	–	–	–	Tie
Sondaxe/La Voz de Galicia	18–21 May 2023	300	?	? 11	? 9	? 3	? 3	? 0	? 0	? 1	–	?
Sondaxe/La Voz de Galicia	14–17 May 2023	300	?	? 11	? 10	? 2	? 4	? 0	? 0	? 0	–	?
40dB/Prisa	12–17 May 2023	800	?	31.8; 10	32.8; 11	8.1; 2	13.2; 4	1.5; 0	4.8; 0	3.6; 0	–	1.0
Sondaxe/La Voz de Galicia	13–16 May 2023	300	?	? 11	? 10	? 2	? 4	? 0	? 0	? 0	–	?
Sondaxe/La Voz de Galicia	12–15 May 2023	300	?	? 11	? 10	? 2	? 4	? 0	? 0	? 0	–	?
DYM/Prensa Ibérica	10–15 May 2023	623	?	32.3; 10/11	31.8; 10/11	8.5; 2	11.9; 3/4	–	5.2; 0/1	5.7; 0/1	–	0.5
Sondaxe/La Voz de Galicia	11–14 May 2023	300	?	? 10	? 11	? 2	? 4	? 0	? 0	? 0	–	?
SocioMétrica/El Español	8–14 May 2023	300	?	35.1; 11/12	26.6; 8/9	7.9; 2	13.1; 3/4	1.9; 0	4.9; 0/1	5.6; 1	–	8.5
Sondaxe/La Voz de Galicia	10–13 May 2023	300	?	? 10	? 11	? 2	? 4	? 0	? 0	? 0	–	?
Sondaxe/La Voz de Galicia	9–12 May 2023	300	?	30.7; 10	32.0; 10	8.9; 3	12.8; 4	2.7; 0	4.5; 0	4.7; 0	–	1.3
Edesga/Cadena SER	28 Apr 2023	500	?	31.7; 9/10	40.2; 11/12	7.1; 2/3	11.4; 3/4	–	–	5.0; 0/1	–	8.5
Sondaxe/La Voz de Galicia	19–27 Apr 2023	400	65.3	32.5; 11	33.6; 11	8.7; 2	11.0; 3	1.4; 0	4.2; 0	4.8; 0	–	1.1
Galicia Voto a Voto/El Ideal Gallego	20 Mar–26 Apr 2023	746	?	37.5; 11	32.3; 10	7.9; 2	9.9; 3	1.4; 0	3.6; 0	6.4; 1	–	5.2
Galicia Voto a Voto/El Ideal Gallego	13 Mar–19 Apr 2023	693	?	38.2; 11	33.3; 9	6.9; 2	12.3; 3	0.4; 0	2.7; 0	5.9; 2	–	4.9
Galicia Voto a Voto/El Ideal Gallego	6 Mar–12 Apr 2023	552	?	39.3; 11	33.0; 9	7.0; 2	14.3; 4	–	–	4.5; 1	–	6.3
Galicia Voto a Voto/El Ideal Gallego	27 Feb–5 Apr 2023	405	?	42.3; 12	33.1; 9/10	5.5; 1/2	14.0; 4	–	0.7; 0	3.7; 0	–	9.2
Galicia Voto a Voto/El Ideal Gallego	21 Feb–29 Mar 2023	320	?	43.7; 12	30.5; 9	5.6; 1	14.1; 4	–	0.9; 0	4.7; 1	–	13.2
Sigma Dos/El Mundo	17–23 Feb 2023	430	?	37.9; 11/12	30.4; 9	7.5; 2	10.7; 2	0.2; 0	4.9; 0/1	6.4; 1/2	–	7.5
Sondaxe/La Voz de Galicia	1–9 Feb 2023	400	?	32.3; 10	34.2; 10	11.5; 3	14.4; 4	0.2; 0	–	–	–	1.9
Sondaxe/La Voz de Galicia	1–14 Dec 2022	400	?	31.8; 10	33.9; 10	10.6; 3	15.2; 4	–	–	–	–	2.1
GAD3/PP	14–17 Oct 2022	400	?	38.9; 12	33.3; 10	6.3; 1	14.2; 4	1.1; 0	3.2; 0	–	–	5.6
Sondaxe/La Voz de Galicia	4–25 May 2022	400	?	30.5; 9	34.9; 11	12.7; 3	13.1; 4	–	–	–	–	4.4
Sondaxe/La Voz de Galicia	4–20 May 2021	400	?	28.3; 9	36.6; 11	11.3; 3	15.5; 4	–	–	–	–	8.3
ElectoPanel/Electomanía	1 Apr–15 Jun 2020	?	?	30.8; 10	33.6; 10	–	10.6; 3	3.7; 0	7.8; 2	8.3; 2	2.5; 0	2.8
2019 municipal election	26 May 2019	—N/a	62.8	30.3; 9	30.0; 9	20.2; 6	7.2; 2	5.8; 1	2.1; 0	(Note: Within Marea Atlántica.)		0.3

=== Ferrol ===
Color key:

Poll conducted after legal ban on opinion polls

Polling firm/Commissioner	Fieldwork date	Sample size	Turnout	PP	PSdeG–PSOE	FeC	BNG	Lead
2023 municipal election	28 May 2023	—N/a	56.6	45.3; 13	27.4; 7	9.6; 2	10.7; 3	17.9
Sondaxe/La Voz de Galicia	23–26 May 2023	300	?	? 14	? 7	? 2	? 2	?
Sondaxe/La Voz de Galicia	18–21 May 2023	300	?	? 13	? 7	? 2	? 3	?
Sondaxe/La Voz de Galicia	14–17 May 2023	300	?	? 14	? 7	? 2	? 2	?
Sondaxe/La Voz de Galicia	13–16 May 2023	300	?	? 13	? 8	? 2	? 2	?
Sondaxe/La Voz de Galicia	12–15 May 2023	300	?	? 13	? 8	? 2	? 2	?
Sondaxe/La Voz de Galicia	11–14 May 2023	300	?	? 13	? 8	? 2	? 2	?
Sondaxe/La Voz de Galicia	10–13 May 2023	300	?	? 13	? 8	? 2	? 2	?
Sondaxe/La Voz de Galicia	9–12 May 2023	300	?	46.0; 13	28.4; 8	8.6; 2	9.0; 2	17.6
Sondaxe/La Voz de Galicia	19–27 Apr 2023	400	63.3	47.0; 14	25.9; 7	8.4; 2	9.7; 2	21.1
Sondaxe/La Voz de Galicia	1–9 Feb 2023	400	?	44.9; 13	26.2; 7	9.0; 2	11.1; 3	18.7
Sondaxe/La Voz de Galicia	1–14 Dec 2022	400	?	44.3; 13	27.0; 7	7.5; 2	11.4; 3	17.3
Sondaxe/La Voz de Galicia	4–25 May 2022	400	?	44.9; 13	26.5; 8	6.0; 1	12.2; 3	18.4
Sondaxe/La Voz de Galicia	4–20 May 2021	400	?	43.2; 12	29.0; 8	7.8; 2	11.0; 3	14.2
2019 municipal election	26 May 2019	—N/a	61.1	41.4; 12	29.5; 8	10.7; 3	7.4; 2	11.9

=== Lugo ===
Color key:

Poll conducted after legal ban on opinion polls

Polling firm/Commissioner	Fieldwork date	Sample size	Turnout	PP	PSdeG–PSOE	BNG	CS	Vox	Lead
2023 municipal election	28 May 2023	—N/a	64.3	43.6; 12	27.7; 8	19.9; 5	2.7; 0	2.3; 0	15.9
GAD3/RTVE–FORTA	12–27 May 2023	?	?	? 12/13	? 7/8	? 5	? 0	–	?
Sondaxe/La Voz de Galicia	23–26 May 2023	300	?	? 12	? 7	? 6	? 0	–	?
Sondaxe/La Voz de Galicia	18–21 May 2023	300	?	? 13	? 7	? 5	? 0	–	?
Sondaxe/La Voz de Galicia	14–17 May 2023	300	?	? 12	? 7	? 5	? 1	–	?
Sondaxe/La Voz de Galicia	13–16 May 2023	300	?	? 12	? 8	? 4	? 1	–	?
Sondaxe/La Voz de Galicia	12–15 May 2023	300	?	? 12	? 7	? 5	? 1	–	?
DYM/Prensa Ibérica	10–15 May 2023	?	?	41.7; 11/12	26.1; 8	17.6; 4/5	4.8; 0/1	4.9; 0/1	15.6
Sondaxe/La Voz de Galicia	11–14 May 2023	300	?	? 12	? 7	? 5	? 1	–	?
Sondaxe/La Voz de Galicia	10–13 May 2023	300	?	? 12	? 7	? 5	? 1	–	?
Sondaxe/La Voz de Galicia	9–12 May 2023	300	?	41.5; 12	26.6; 8	18.5; 5	4.6; 0	–	14.9
Sondaxe/La Voz de Galicia	19–27 Apr 2023	400	63.7	40.0; 12	25.9; 8	18.9; 5	3.5; 0	3.5; 0	14.1
Sondaxe/La Voz de Galicia	1–9 Feb 2023	400	?	39.4; 12	27.3; 8	19.4; 5	3.7; 0	–	12.1
Sondaxe/La Voz de Galicia	1–14 Dec 2022	400	?	39.3; 12	27.9; 8	19.6; 5	–	–	11.4
Sondaxe/La Voz de Galicia	4–25 May 2022	400	?	39.1; 11	26.1; 8	18.7; 5	5.8; 1	–	13.0
Infortécnica/El Progreso	13 Jun 2021	?	?	? 12	? 7	? 6	–	–	?
Sondaxe/La Voz de Galicia	4–20 May 2021	400	?	37.2; 11	25.1; 8	21.5; 6	–	–	12.1
2019 municipal election	26 May 2019	—N/a	61.5	32.4; 10	26.5; 8	16.4; 5	8.3; 2	2.0; 0	5.9

=== Monforte de Lemos ===
Polling firm/Commissioner	Fieldwork date	Sample size	Turnout	PSdeG–PSOE	PP	esperta	BNG	Lead
2023 municipal election	28 May 2023	—N/a	62.7	54.7; 10	25.5; 4	5.8; 1	12.4; 2	29.2
Infortécnica/El Progreso	Abr–May 2023	137	?	61.7; 11/12	25.0; 4	2.3; 0/1	8.3; 1/2	36.7
Sondaxe/La Voz de Galicia	24 Oct–10 Nov 2022	200	?	60.1; 12	18.3; 3	8.3; 1	9.3; 1	41.8
Sondaxe/La Voz de Galicia	5–21 Nov 2021	400	?	58.3; 11/12	20.9; 3/4	8.5; 1	8.7; 1	37.4
Infortécnica/El Progreso	27 Jun 2021	?	?	? 11/12	? 4/5	? 0/1	? 1/2	?
2019 municipal election	26 May 2019	—N/a	64.2	55.6; 11	22.1; 4	9.3; 1	8.5; 1	33.5

=== O Carballiño ===
Polling firm/Commissioner	Fieldwork date	Sample size	Turnout	PSdeG–PSOE	PP	EsCo	BNG	Lead
2023 municipal election	28 May 2023	—N/a	68.3	34.5; 6	29.5; 5	26.0; 5	8.1; 1	5.0
Infortécnica/La Región	Apr 2023	121	?	50.8; 8/9	27.1; 4/5	15.3; 3	6.8; 1	23.7
2019 municipal election	26 May 2019	—N/a	64.2	49.9; 9	20.5; 4	18.5; 3	5.6; 1	29.4

=== Ourense ===
Color key:

Poll conducted after legal ban on opinion polls

Polling firm/Commissioner	Fieldwork date	Sample size	Turnout	PSdeG–PSOE	PP	DO	CS	BNG	Unidas Podemos	Vox	Lead
2023 municipal election	28 May 2023	—N/a	65.8	19.3; 6	25.0; 7	33.7; 10	0.4; 0	15.7; 4	1.4; 0	1.8; 0	8.7
GAD3/RTVE–FORTA	12–27 May 2023	?	?	? 7/8	? 9/10	? 6	? 0	? 4	–	–	?
Sondaxe/La Voz de Galicia	23–26 May 2023	300	?	? 8	? 9	? 6	? 0	? 4	–	–	?
Sondaxe/La Voz de Galicia	18–21 May 2023	300	?	? 8	? 9	? 6	? 0	? 4	–	–	?
Sondaxe/La Voz de Galicia	14–17 May 2023	300	?	? 8	? 9	? 6	? 0	? 4	–	–	?
Sondaxe/La Voz de Galicia	13–16 May 2023	300	?	? 8	? 9	? 6	? 0	? 4	–	–	?
Sondaxe/La Voz de Galicia	12–15 May 2023	300	?	? 8	? 9	? 6	? 0	? 4	–	–	?
DYM/Prensa Ibérica	5–15 May 2023	?	?	28.6; 8/9	31.5; 9/10	19.8; 6	–	10.6; 3	–	–	2.9
Sondaxe/La Voz de Galicia	11–14 May 2023	300	?	? 8	? 8	? 7	? 0	? 4	–	–	Tie
Sondaxe/La Voz de Galicia	10–13 May 2023	300	?	? 8	? 9	? 7	? 0	? 3	–	–	?
Sondaxe/La Voz de Galicia	9–12 May 2023	300	?	24.1; 8	27.5; 9	23.1; 7	2.7; 0	10.2; 3	–	–	3.4
Infortécnica/La Región	7 May 2023	?	?	? 8/9	? 9/10	? 5	? 0	? 2/3	? 0/1	? 0/2	?
Sondaxe/La Voz de Galicia	19–27 Apr 2023	400	68.4	26.4; 9	29.2; 9	22.3; 7	3.8; 0	7.9; 2	3.1; 0	4.6; 0	2.8
Infortécnica/La Región	30 Apr 2023	484	?	? 7/8	? 10	? 5/6	? 0	? 3	? 0/2	? 0/2	?
Sondaxe/La Voz de Galicia	1–9 Feb 2023	400	?	28.5; 9	29.0; 9	20.9; 6	3.3; 0	9.3; 3	–	–	0.5
Sondaxe/La Voz de Galicia	1–14 Dec 2022	400	?	26.0; 9	28.3; 9	19.9; 6	4.7; 0	11.1; 3	–	–	2.3
Sondaxe/La Voz de Galicia	4–25 May 2022	400	?	29.0; 9	27.9; 9	17.8; 5	5.3; 1	11.9; 3	–	–	1.1
Infortécnica/La Región	13 Jun 2021	360	?	? 9	? 10/11	? 4	? 0	? 3/4	–	–	?
Sondaxe/La Voz de Galicia	4–20 May 2021	400	?	30.4; 9	25.2; 8	18.7; 6	7.4; 2	8.3; 2	–	–	5.2
Celeste-Tel/City Council of Ourense	15–23 Apr 2021	600	61.2	24.8; 9	27.5; 9	18.0; 6	4.8; 0	8.3; 3	–	–	2.7
Sondaxe/La Voz de Galicia	22–27 Oct 2020	300	?	31.9; 10	22.4; 8	14.3; 4	7.5; 2	11.5; 3	–	–	9.5
2019 municipal election	26 May 2019	—N/a	64.8	26.4; 9	22.5; 7	21.5; 7	8.7; 2	6.3; 2	2.6; 0	1.3; 0	3.9

=== Pontevedra ===
Color key:

Poll conducted after legal ban on opinion polls

Polling firm/Commissioner	Fieldwork date	Sample size	Turnout	BNG	PP	PSdeG–PSOE	CS	POA	Unidas Podemos	Vox	Lead
2023 municipal election	28 May 2023	—N/a	63.0	31.4; 9	38.9; 11	17.7; 5	1.0; 0	2.3; 0	1.4; 0	3.5; 0	7.5
GAD3/RTVE–FORTA	12–27 May 2023	?	?	? 10/11	? 10/11	? 4	? 0	–	–	–	Tie
Sondaxe/La Voz de Galicia	23–26 May 2023	300	?	? 10	? 11	? 4	–	–	–	–	?
Sondaxe/La Voz de Galicia	18–21 May 2023	300	?	? 11	? 10	? 4	? 0	–	–	–	?
Sondaxe/La Voz de Galicia	14–17 May 2023	300	?	? 11	? 10	? 4	? 0	–	–	–	?
Sondaxe/La Voz de Galicia	13–16 May 2023	300	?	? 11	? 10	? 4	? 0	–	–	–	?
Sondaxe/La Voz de Galicia	12–15 May 2023	300	?	? 11	? 10	? 4	? 0	–	–	–	?
DYM/Prensa Ibérica	5–15 May 2023	408	?	37.1; 11	32.3; 9	16.5; 4/5	–	–	3.8; 0	4.8; 0/1	4.8
Sondaxe/La Voz de Galicia	11–14 May 2023	300	?	? 11	? 9	? 5	? 0	–	–	–	?
Sondaxe/La Voz de Galicia	10–13 May 2023	300	?	? 12	? 9	? 4	? 0	–	–	–	?
Sondaxe/La Voz de Galicia	9–12 May 2023	300	?	40.9; 12	31.1; 9	15.0; 4	2.8; 0	–	–	–	9.8
Sondaxe/La Voz de Galicia	19–27 Apr 2023	400	63.4	39.2; 11	33.1; 10	14.1; 4	3.6; 0	–	–	–	6.1
GAD3/Diario de Pontevedra	16–21 Mar 2023	400	?	34.4; 10	36.9; 10/11	15.9; 4/5	1.6; 0	4.0; 0	1.8; 0	2.5; 0	2.5
Sondaxe/La Voz de Galicia	1–9 Feb 2023	400	?	38.4; 11	33.8; 10	15.7; 4	2.1; 0	–	–	–	4.6
Sondaxe/La Voz de Galicia	1–14 Dec 2022	400	?	39.3; 11	33.4; 10	15.8; 4	–	–	–	–	5.9
GAD3/Diario de Pontevedra	19–20 Oct 2022	401	?	36.0; 10	35.8; 10	20.2; 5	1.9; 0	–	1.1; 0	2.8; 0	0.2
Sondaxe/La Voz de Galicia	4–25 May 2022	400	?	38.4; 11	32.1; 10	16.0; 4	–	–	–	–	6.3
Sondaxe/La Voz de Galicia	4–20 May 2021	400	?	42.6; 13	31.1; 9	11.0; 3	–	–	–	–	11.5
2019 municipal election	26 May 2019	—N/a	62.5	39.8; 11	30.0; 9	14.0; 4	5.2; 1	3.6; 0	3.0; 0	2.5; 0	9.8

=== Ribadeo ===
Polling firm/Commissioner	Fieldwork date	Sample size	Turnout	BNG	PP	PSdeG–PSOE	Lead
2023 municipal election	28 May 2023	—N/a	69.3	38.9; 5	47.6; 7	10.6; 1	8.7
Infortécnica/El Progreso	Apr–May 2023	?	?	42.8; 5/6	38.8; 5	16.6; 2/3	4.0
2019 municipal election	26 May 2019	—N/a	70.7	45.5; 7	30.7; 4	13.5; 2	14.8

=== Santiago de Compostela ===
Color key:

Poll conducted after legal ban on opinion polls

Polling firm/Commissioner	Fieldwork date	Sample size	Turnout	PSdeG–PSOE	PP	Compostela Aberta	BNG	Vox	Lead
2023 municipal election	28 May 2023	—N/a	61.9	21.7; 6	37.7; 11	9.2; 2	23.6; 6	3.4; 0	14.1
Sondaxe/La Voz de Galicia	23–26 May 2023	300	?	? 7	? 10	? 3	? 5	–	?
Sondaxe/La Voz de Galicia	18–21 May 2023	300	?	? 7	? 10	? 3	? 5	–	?
Sondaxe/La Voz de Galicia	14–17 May 2023	300	?	? 7	? 10	? 4	? 4	–	?
Sondaxe/La Voz de Galicia	13–16 May 2023	300	?	? 7	? 11	? 3	? 4	–	?
Sondaxe/La Voz de Galicia	12–15 May 2023	300	?	28.2; 7	? 11	? 3	16.9; 4	–	?
DYM/Prensa Ibérica	10–15 May 2023	?	?	27.8; 7/8	34.7; 10/11	8.9; 2	18.7; 5	3.6; 0	6.9
Sondaxe/La Voz de Galicia	11–14 May 2023	300	?	27.4; 7	? 10	? 3	19.1; 5	–	?
Sondaxe/La Voz de Galicia	10–13 May 2023	300	?	? 8	? 9	? 3	? 5	–	?
Sondaxe/La Voz de Galicia	9–12 May 2023	300	?	30.2; 8	35.3; 9	11.8; 3	18.2; 5	–	5.1
Sondaxe/La Voz de Galicia	19–27 Apr 2023	400	65.2	26.9; 7	34.1; 10	14.7; 4	16.9; 4	–	7.2
Sondaxe/La Voz de Galicia	1–9 Feb 2023	400	?	30.8; 8	34.5; 10	11.4; 3	15.9; 4	–	3.7
Sondaxe/La Voz de Galicia	1–14 Dec 2022	400	?	30.7; 8	29.5; 8	14.8; 4	17.8; 5	–	1.2
Sondaxe/La Voz de Galicia	4–25 May 2022	400	?	32.0; 9	27.5; 7	13.9; 4	17.3; 5	–	4.5
Sondaxe/La Voz de Galicia	4–20 May 2021	400	?	36.2; 10	26.9; 7	14.0; 4	15.9; 4	–	9.3
2019 municipal election	26 May 2019	—N/a	66.7	34.7; 10	29.2; 8	20.4; 5	9.3; 2	1.1; 0	5.5

=== Sarria ===
Polling firm/Commissioner	Fieldwork date	Sample size	Turnout	CS	PP	PSdeG–PSOE	BNG	Ga.S	Lead
2023 municipal election	28 May 2023	—N/a	72.8	36.1; 7	26.6; 5	16.4; 3	13.9; 2	–	9.5
Infortécnica/El Progreso	21 Jun 2021	?	?	? 5/6	? 5	? 3/4	? 2/3	? 0/1	?
2019 municipal election	26 May 2019	—N/a	73.4	28.7; 6	24.8; 6	12.4; 2	11.6; 2	6.9; 1	3.9

=== Vigo ===
Color key:

Poll conducted after legal ban on opinion polls

Polling firm/Commissioner	Fieldwork date	Sample size	Turnout	PSdeG–PSOE	PP	Marea de Vigo	BNG	CS	Vox	Lead
2023 municipal election	28 May 2023	—N/a	57.5	60.9; 19	18.6; 5	4.8; 0	11.1; 3	0.5; 0	2.6; 0	42.3
GAD3/RTVE–FORTA	12–27 May 2023	?	?	62.0; 19/20	18.0; 5	3.0; 0	10.0; 2/3	0.0; 0	2.0; 0	44.0
Sondaxe/La Voz de Galicia	23–26 May 2023	300	?	? 19	? 5	? 1	? 2	–	–	?
Sondaxe/La Voz de Galicia	18–21 May 2023	300	?	? 19	? 5	? 0	? 3	–	–	?
Infortécnica/Atlántico	15–18 May 2023	412	?	69.4; 19/20	17.9; 4/5	2.3; 0/1	10.4; 2/3	–	–	51.5
Sondaxe/La Voz de Galicia	14–17 May 2023	300	?	? 20	? 5	? 0	? 2	–	–	?
Sondaxe/La Voz de Galicia	13–16 May 2023	300	?	? 20	? 5	? 0	? 2	–	–	?
Infortécnica/Radio Vigo	12–16 May 2023	403	?	71.7; 19/21	16.0; 4	1.9; 0/1	10.4; 2/3	–	–	55.7
Sondaxe/La Voz de Galicia	12–15 May 2023	300	?	? 20	? 4	? 1	? 2	–	–	?
DYM/Prensa Ibérica	10–15 May 2023	807	?	64.8; 19/20	16.9; 5	4.7; 0/1	8.1; 2	–	–	47.9
Sondaxe/La Voz de Galicia	11–14 May 2023	300	?	? 20	? 4	? 1	? 2	–	–	?
Sondaxe/La Voz de Galicia	10–13 May 2023	300	?	? 20	? 4	? 1	? 2	–	–	?
Sondaxe/La Voz de Galicia	9–12 May 2023	300	?	65.7; 19	16.9; 5	6.4; 1	7.4; 2	–	–	48.8
Sondaxe/La Voz de Galicia	19–27 Apr 2023	400	67.2	64.9; 19	16.6; 5	6.3; 1	7.3; 2	–	–	48.3
CIS	10–26 Apr 2023	815	?	65.6; 18/21	14.8; 3/5	6.3; 0/2	9.0; 1/3	–	1.5; 0	50.8
Infortécnica/Atlántico	16 Apr 2023	?	?	66.2; 19/21	17.6; 4/5	5.4; 1/2	10.8; 2/3	–	–	48.6
Sigma Dos/El Mundo	17–23 Feb 2023	429	?	67.7; 19/20	15.0; 4	5.6; 1/2	6.9; 2	1.0; 0	2.5; 0	52.7
Sondaxe/La Voz de Galicia	1–9 Feb 2023	400	?	64.5; 19	16.5; 5	5.2; 1	8.5; 2	–	–	48.0
Sondaxe/La Voz de Galicia	1–14 Dec 2022	400	?	64.6; 20	15.2; 4	5.4; 1	8.1; 2	–	–	49.4
Sondaxe/La Voz de Galicia	4–25 May 2022	400	?	64.1; 20	14.0; 4	5.6; 1	8.4; 2	–	–	50.1
Sondaxe/La Voz de Galicia	4–20 May 2021	400	?	64.1; 19	14.9; 4	7.4; 2	9.3; 2	–	–	49.2
2019 municipal election	26 May 2019	—N/a	62.7	67.6; 20	13.7; 4	7.0; 2	5.7; 1	2.4; 0	1.3; 0	53.9

=== Vilagarcía de Arousa ===
Polling firm/Commissioner	Fieldwork date	Sample size	Turnout	PSdeG–PSOE	PP	BNG	VeC	MDV–Podemos	CS	Vox	Lead
2023 municipal election	28 May 2023	—N/a	58.5	36.1; 9	36.3; 9	11.9; 2	6.2; 1	4.8; 0	–	3.4; 0	0.2
Sondaxe/La Voz de Galicia	19 Apr–9 May 2023	300	55	42.6; 11	30.1; 7	11.1; 2	4.6; 0	7.3; 1	–	4.2; 0	12.5
Sondaxe/La Voz de Galicia	Dec 2022	401	?	44.8; 11	25.5; 6	10.0; 2	6.1; 1	6.2; 1	–	–	19.3
Sondaxe/La Voz de Galicia	16 May 2021	?	?	50.5; 12	21.3; 5	16.2; 4	3.4; 0	4.9; 0	1.1; 0	–	29.2
2019 municipal election	26 May 2019	—N/a	60.1	47.5; 12	22.9; 5	7.9; 1	6.7; 1	6.2; 1	5.1; 1	–	24.6

=== Vilalba ===
Polling firm/Commissioner	Fieldwork date	Sample size	Turnout	PSdeG–PSOE	PP	VA–SC	BNG	Lead
2023 municipal election	28 May 2023	—N/a	71.9	26.0; 5	45.8; 8	19.2; 3	7.9; 1	19.8
Infortécnica/El Progreso	20 Jun 2021	120	?	? 7/8	? 7/8	? 2/3	–	Tie
2019 municipal election	26 May 2019	—N/a	71.3	43.8; 8	39.7; 7	11.5; 2	3.9; 0	4.1

=== Viveiro ===
Polling firm/Commissioner	Fieldwork date	Sample size	Turnout	PSdeG–PSOE	PP	xV	BNG	Son	Podemos	Vox	Lead
2023 municipal election	28 May 2023	—N/a	66.7	25.0; 5	39.3; 7	12.7; 2	18.1; 3	–	2.5; 0	1.5; 0	14.3
Infortécnica/El Progreso	Apr–May 2023	?	?	46.6; 8/9	? 5	? 1/2	? 1/2	–	? 0/1	? 0/1	?
Infortécnica/El Progreso	28 Jun 2021	?	?	? 7/8	? 6	? 1	? 2/3	? 0/1	–	–	?
2019 municipal election	26 May 2019	—N/a	66.8	45.4; 8	25.5; 5	14.1; 2	7.5; 1	5.4; 1	–	–	19.9

=== Xinzo de Limia ===
Polling firm/Commissioner	Fieldwork date	Sample size	Turnout	PP	PSdeG–PSOE	AXIL	CS	XA	BNG	Vox	Lead
2023 municipal election	28 May 2023	—N/a	72.0	27.9; 4	29.2; 4	19.9; 3	–	–	18.9; 2	3.2; 0	1.3
Infortécnica/La Región	13 May 2023	?	?	? 5	? 4/5	? 1/2	? 0	? 0	? 1/2	? 0/1	?
2019 municipal election	26 May 2019	—N/a	74.9	33.2; 5	25.1; 3	14.8; 2	9.9; 1	8.2; 1	6.9; 1	–	8.1
