= 2023 Spanish local elections in La Rioja =

This article presents the results breakdown of the local elections held in La Rioja on 28 May 2023. The following tables show detailed results in the autonomous community's most populous municipalities, sorted alphabetically.

== City control ==
The following table lists party control in the most populous municipalities, including provincial capitals (shown in bold). Gains for a party are displayed with the cell's background shaded in that party's colour.

Municipality	Population	Previous control	New control
**Logroño**	150,020	Spanish Socialist Workers' Party (PSOE)	People's Party (PP)

== Municipalities ==
=== Logroño ===
Population: 150,020

← Summary of the 28 May 2023 City Council of Logroño election results →
Parties and alliances	Popular vote			Seats	
Parties and alliances	Votes	%	±pp	Total	+/−
People's Party (PP)	33,831	43.73	+14.27	**14**	+5
Spanish Socialist Workers' Party (PSOE)	24,067	31.11	−6.24	**9**	−2
Vox (Vox)	6,041	7.81	+3.72	**2**	+2
United We Can–United Left (Podemos–IU)	3,954	5.11	−2.00	**1**	−1
Riojan Party (PR+)	3,937	5.09	−0.46	**1**	±0
For La Rioja (PLRi)	2,398	3.10	New	0	±0
Citizens–Party of the Citizenry (CS)	931	1.20	−12.20	0	−4
VINEA La Rioja (VINEA)	531	0.69	New	0	±0
Blank Seats to Leave Empty Seats (EB)	479	0.62	New	0	±0
Blank ballots	1,196	1.55	+0.65		
**Total**	**77,365**			**27**	**±0**
Valid votes	77,365	98.38	−0.83		
Invalid votes	1,272	1.62	+0.83		
**Votes cast / turnout**	**78,637**	**70.30**	**+3.09**		
Abstentions	33,230	29.70	−3.09		
**Registered voters**	**111,867**				

== See also ==
- 2023 Riojan regional election
