= Opinion polling for the 2023 Spanish local elections (Balearic Islands) =

In the run up to the 2023 Spanish local elections, various organisations carried out opinion polling to gauge voting intention in local entities in Spain. Results of such polls for municipalities and island councils in the Balearic Islands are displayed in this article. The date range for these opinion polls is from the previous local elections, held on 26 May 2019, to the day the next elections were held, on 28 May 2023.

Polls are listed in reverse chronological order, showing the most recent first and using the dates when the survey fieldwork was done, as opposed to the date of publication. Where the fieldwork dates are unknown, the date of publication is given instead. The highest percentage figure in each polling survey is displayed with its background shaded in the leading party's colour. If a tie ensues, this is applied to the figures with the highest percentages. The "Lead" columns on the right shows the percentage-point difference between the parties with the highest percentages in a given poll.

== Municipalities ==
=== Ibiza (town) ===
Polling firm/Commissioner	Fieldwork date	Sample size	Turnout	PSIB–PSOE	PP	Unides Podem–EUIB	CS	EPIC	Vox	PxE	Ara	Lead
2023 municipal election	28 May 2023	—N/a	48.3	24.8; 7	47.6; 15	5.5; 1	1.6; 0	3.7; 0	8.8; 1	–	4.2; 0	22.8
IBES/Periódico de Ibiza	24–31 Jan 2023	600	?	28.4; 9	38.8; 12	8.7; 2	2.6; 0	2.4; 0	7.5; 2	4.0; 0	3.0; 0	10.4
IBES/Periódico de Ibiza	4–15 Jul 2022	900	?	26.8; 8	36.5; 11	9.5; 3	3.4; 0	–	9.3; 2	6.2; 1	–	9.7
2019 municipal election	26 May 2019	—N/a	47.7	32.7; 9	29.3; 8	10.3; 2	9.5; 2	4.7; 0	4.5; 0	4.2; 0	3.7; 0	3.4

=== Palma ===
Polling firm/Commissioner	Fieldwork date	Sample size	Turnout	PSIB–PSOE	PP	Vox	CS	Unidas Podemos	Més	El Pi	Lead
2023 municipal election	28 May 2023	—N/a	54.5	24.9; 8	32.2; 11	20.5; 6	1.9; 0	5.1; 1	9.3; 3	2.3; 0	7.3
Gadeso/Diario de Mallorca	30 Apr–15 May 2023	?	?	23.1; 8/9	24.9; 8/9	14.6; 5/6	2.3; 0	8.5; 2/3	12.4; 4	–	1.8
NC Report/Mallorca Diario	11–17 Apr 2023	600	51.9	24.0; 8	27.8; 9	18.5; 6	3.6; 0	9.5; 3	9.2; 3	4.1; 0	3.8
IBES/Última Hora	3–7 Apr 2023	1,040	?	24.3; 8	27.1; 9	18.7; 6	4.3; 0	8.6; 2/3	10.1; 3/4	2.7; 0	2.8
IBES/Última Hora	5–15 Jan 2023	400	?	23.1; 8	27.4; 9	16.7; 6	4.5; 0	8.4; 3	10.9; 3	4.5; 0	4.3
Sigma Dos/El Mundo	16–22 Dec 2022	408	?	24.6; 8	28.8; 9	12.4; 4	5.6; 1/2	6.7; 2	14.6; 4/5	–	4.2
IBES/Última Hora	1–10 Mar 2022	?	?	20.1; 6	26.8; 9	20.6; 7	5.6; 1	10.0; 3	10.4; 3	1.9; 0	6.2
Data10/Okdiario	24–25 Sep 2021	1,000	?	25.7; 9	26.9; 9	18.4; 6	3.5; 0	8.5; 2	9.8; 3	3.4; 0	1.2
IBES/Última Hora	13–20 Sep 2021	600	?	22.2; 7	25.6; 9	18.7; 6	4.7; 0	9.5; 3	12.5; 4	2.3; 0	3.4
ElectoPanel/Electomanía	1 Apr–15 Jun 2020	?	?	26.2; 8	24.3; 8	15.7; 5	8.7; 2	8.8; 3	9.4; 3	–	1.9
2019 municipal election	26 May 2019	—N/a	50.2	26.5; 9	18.8; 6	13.2; 4	12.2; 4	10.8; 3	10.4; 3	3.7; 0	7.7

== Island Councils ==
=== Formentera ===
Polling firm/Commissioner	Fieldwork date	Sample size	Turnout	GxF	Sa Unió	PSIB–PSOE	Vox	Podemos	Lead
2023 island council election	28 May 2023	—N/a	55.0	26.0; 5	47.1; 9	17.7; 3	1.9; 0	3.9; 0	21.1
Gadeso/Diario de Mallorca	30 Apr–15 May 2023	?	?	? 6	? 5/6	? 4/5	? 0/1	? 0/1	?
Periódico de Ibiza (Note: Undecided and/or abstentionists excluded.)	Dec 2022	505	52.1	42.0; 7	30.7; 6	23.4; 4	3.8; 0	–	11.3
2019 island council election	26 May 2019	—N/a	51.5	35.5; 6	33.7; 6	26.9; 5	2.7; 0	–	1.8

=== Ibiza (island) ===
Polling firm/Commissioner	Fieldwork date	Sample size	Turnout	PP	PSIB–PSOE	Unides Podem–EUIB	CS	Vox	El Pi	Lead
2023 island council election	28 May 2023	—N/a	47.2	52.4; 8	24.3; 3	6.3; 1	1.5; 0	8.2; 1	1.3; 0	28.1
IBES/Última Hora	12–18 May 2023	600	?	46.5; 7	27.2; 4	9.0; 1	1.3; 0	7.2; 1	4.3; 0	19.3
Gadeso/Diario de Mallorca	30 Apr–15 May 2023	?	?	? 6	? 4	? 2	? 0	? 1	? 0	?
IBES/Última Hora	5–15 Jan 2023	400	?	? 7	? 4	? 1	? 0	? 1	? 0	?
IBES/Última Hora	26–30 Sep 2022	300	?	37.1; 6/7	26.1; 4	11.9; 1/2	3.7; 0	10.0; 1	3.5; 0	11.0
IBES/Periódico de Ibiza	4–15 Jul 2022	900	?	36.6; 6	27.9; 4	11.4; 2	3.4; 0	10.8; 1	3.9; 0	8.7
IBES/Última Hora	1–10 Mar 2022	200	?	35.2; 5	24.6; 4	15.6; 2	6.5; 1	11.2; 1	3.3; 0	10.6
IBES/Última Hora	8–12 Jun 2021	200	?	34.3; 6	28.3; 5	10.6; 1	7.4; 1	5.5; 0	5.5; 0	6.0
IBES/Última Hora	8–12 Jun 2020	200	?	34.6; 5/6	31.6; 5	9.7; 1	6.1; 0/1	6.4; 0/1	4.1; 0	3.0
2019 island council election	26 May 2019	—N/a	49.4	39.4; 6	28.5; 4	12.0; 2	6.9; 1	4.1; 0	2.9 (Note: Results for PxE.); 0	10.9

=== Mallorca ===
Polling firm/Commissioner	Fieldwork date	Sample size	Turnout	PSIB–PSOE	PP	Més	CS	Unides Podem–EUIB	El Pi	Vox	Lead
2023 island council election	28 May 2023	—N/a	58.9	25.5; 9	34.2; 13	11.7; 4	1.4; 0	4.3; 0	5.2; 2	15.3; 5	8.7
Gadeso/Diario de Mallorca	30 Apr–15 May 2023	?	?	25.1; 7/8	28.1; 8/9	12.8; 4/5	2.0; 0	8.6; 3	7.9; 3	13.0; 4/5	3.0
IBES/Última Hora	5–15 Jan 2023	400	?	? 9/10	? 10/11	? 4	? 0	? 3	? 0/2	? 6	?
IBES/Última Hora	26–30 Sep 2022	300	?	? 7/8	? 11/12	? 3/4	? 0	? 3	? 2	? 5/6	?
IBES/Última Hora	1–10 Mar 2022	600	?	20.3; 7	24.9; 9	11.7; 4	7.5; 2	12.1; 4	6.0; 2	16.2; 5	4.6
Data10/Okdiario	23–24 Sep 2021	?	?	25.2; 9	26.8; 10	13.1; 4	5.0; 0	7.9; 2	8.8; 3	13.5; 5	1.6
IBES/Última Hora	8–12 Jun 2021	600	?	24.0; 8/9	25.9; 9/10	11.3; 4	6.8; 2	10.0; 3	7.7; 2	11.1; 4	1.9
IBES/Última Hora	8–12 Jun 2020	600	?	28.5; 10/11	22.7; 8/9	10.5; 3/4	7.1; 2	8.8; 3	7.1; 2	11.7; 3/4	5.8
2019 island council election	26 May 2019	—N/a	56.2	26.5; 10	20.6; 7	12.7; 4	10.3; 3	9.5; 3	9.1; 3	9.1; 3	5.9

=== Menorca ===
Polling firm/Commissioner	Fieldwork date	Sample size	Turnout	PP	PSIB–PSOE	MxMe	Unides Podem–EUIB	CS	El Pi	Vox	Lead
2023 island council election	28 May 2023	—N/a	55.0	39.4; 6	27.2; 4	17.4; 2	6.2; 0	1.3; 0	–	6.2; 1	12.2
IBES/Menorca.info	12–18 May 2023	600	?	37.5; 5/6	26.7; 4	18.8; 2/3	8.4; 1	2.3; 0	–	4.6; 0	10.8
Gadeso/Diario de Mallorca	30 Apr–15 May 2023	?	?	? 4	? 4	? 3	? 1	? 0	? 0	? 1	?
PSYMA/MxMe	27 Mar–5 Apr 2023	800	56	32.3; 5	23.9; 3/4	23.8; 3/4	7.9; 0/1	2.8; 0	–	6.2; 0/1	8.4
IBES/Última Hora	5–15 Jan 2023	400	?	35.1; 5	25.3; 4	20.6; 3	9.8; 1	3.0; 0	–	4.5; 0	9.8
IBES/Última Hora	26–30 Sep 2022	300	?	33.1; 5/6	23.1; 3/4	18.9; 3	11.3; 1	3.6; 0	2.1; 0	5.7; 0	10.0
IBES/Última Hora	1–10 Mar 2022	200	?	27.0; 4	22.5; 3	20.9; 3	13.0; 2	6.3; 0	1.8; 0	7.0; 1	4.5
IBES/Última Hora	8–12 Jun 2021	200	?	28.9; 4/5	26.1; 4	16.2; 2	11.7; 1/2	6.6; 0/1	2.1; 0	5.9; 0	2.8
IBES/Última Hora	8–12 Jun 2020	200	?	25.9; 4	29.1; 4/5	14.7; 2	10.3; 1/2	7.9; 1	2.2; 0	5.4; 0/1	3.2
2019 island council election	26 May 2019	—N/a	58.0	28.6; 4	26.7; 4	17.8; 3	11.0; 1	8.6; 1	2.7; 0	2.7; 0	1.9
