= Opinion polling for the 2023 Spanish local elections (Navarre) =

In the run up to the 2023 Spanish local elections, various organisations carried out opinion polling to gauge voting intention in local entities in Spain. Results of such polls for municipalities in Navarre are displayed in this article. The date range for these opinion polls is from the previous local elections, held on 26 May 2019, to the day the next elections were held, on 28 May 2023.

Polls are listed in reverse chronological order, showing the most recent first and using the dates when the survey fieldwork was done, as opposed to the date of publication. Where the fieldwork dates are unknown, the date of publication is given instead. The highest percentage figure in each polling survey is displayed with its background shaded in the leading party's colour. If a tie ensues, this is applied to the figures with the highest percentages. The "Lead" columns on the right shows the percentage-point difference between the parties with the highest percentages in a given poll.

== Municipalities ==
=== Pamplona ===
Color key:

Poll conducted after legal ban on opinion polls

Polling firm/Commissioner	Fieldwork date	Sample size	Turnout	NA+	EH Bildu	PSN–PSOE	GBai	Podemos	I–E (n)	Vox	UPN	PP	CS	C/Z	Lead
2023 municipal election	28 May 2023	—N/a	66.6	–	27.4; 8	15.7; 5	7.6; 2	(Note: Within C/Z.)		2.9; 0	30.3; 9	8.4; 2	0.4; 0	5.2; 1	2.9
Sigma Dos/EiTB	22–27 May 2023	800	?	–	26.5; 7/8	14.1; 4	9.7; 2/3			–	26.7; 7/8	10.6; 3	–	6.7; 1/2	0.2
Sigma Dos/EiTB	3–11 May 2023	697	?	–	24.8; 7	17.2; 4/5	10.4; 2/3			1.3; 0	27.6; 7/8	10.1; 2/3	–	6.8; 1/2	2.8
CIES/Diario de Navarra	2–11 May 2023	697	?	–	26.8; 8/9	14.8; 4	7.3; 2			2.8; 0	28.3; 8/9	13.1; 3/4	–	5.2; 0/1	1.5
Gizaker/Grupo Noticias	8–9 May 2023	?	?	–	26.2; 8	15.9; 4	10.7; 3			2.5; 0	29.0; 9	7.1; 2	–	6.0; 1	2.8
Demométrica/Navarra TV	3–9 May 2023	600	?	–	24.0; 7	17.8; 5	9.8; 2/3			1.3; 0	28.5; 9	9.7; 2/3	0.4; 0	7.0; 2	4.5
Demoscopia y Servicios/Okdiario	4–8 May 2023	1,500	?	–	26.2; 8	16.6; 5	8.4; 2			3.2; 0	29.8; 9	7.1; 2	0.9; 0	6.4; 1	3.6
Simple Lógica/PSN	20–31 Mar 2023	?	?	–	? 7	? 7	? 2			–	? 8	? 2	–	? 1	?
GAD3/EiTB	22–27 Feb 2023	600	?	–	24.3; 7	14.3; 4	8.4; 2			2.6; 0	31.4; 10	8.4; 2	–	8.4; 2	7.1
Gizaker/Grupo Noticias	7–10 Feb 2023	500	?	–	26.8; 8	16.2; 4/5	10.6; 3			1.7; 0	30.4; 9	7.3; 2	0.3; 0	4.9; 0/1	3.6
Sigma Dos/El Mundo	27 Dic–2 Jan 2023	300	?	–	27.5; 8/9	12.2; 3/4	8.8; 2	3.4; 0	4.0; 0	1.0; 0	37.2; 12	5.2; 1	–	–	9.7
Gizaker/EiTB	2–4 May 2022	400	?	34.5; 11	28.1; 8	15.9; 5	8.0; 2	2.5; 0	3.6; 0	5.2; 1	(Note: Within NA+.)			–	6.4
ElectoPanel/Electomanía	1 Apr–15 Jun 2020	?	?	40.1; 12	28.1; 9	14.1; 4	6.7; 2	–	–	3.1; 0				–	12.0
2019 municipal election	26 May 2019	—N/a	71.1	40.6; 13	24.8; 7	16.2; 5	7.8; 2	3.8; 0	3.4; 0	1.1; 0				–	15.8
