= 2019 Spanish local elections in La Rioja =

This article presents the results breakdown of the local elections held in La Rioja on 26 May 2019. The following tables show detailed results in the autonomous community's most populous municipalities, sorted alphabetically.

== City control ==
The following table lists party control in the most populous municipalities, including provincial capitals (shown in bold). Gains for a party are displayed with the cell's background shaded in that party's colour.

Municipality	Population	Previous control	New control
**Logroño**	151,113	People's Party (PP)	Spanish Socialist Workers' Party (PSOE)

== Municipalities ==
=== Logroño ===
Population: 151,113

← Summary of the 26 May 2019 City Council of Logroño election results →
Parties and alliances	Popular vote			Seats	
Parties and alliances	Votes	%	±pp	Total	+/−
Spanish Socialist Workers' Party (PSOE)	28,066	37.35	+12.81	**11**	+4
People's Party (PP)	22,135	29.46	−6.32	**9**	−2
Citizens–Party of the Citizenry (Cs)	10,067	13.40	−0.66	**4**	±0
United We Can–United Left–Equo (Podemos–IU–Equo)^{1}	5,341	7.11	−8.46	**2**	−2
Riojan Party (PR+)	4,173	5.55	+0.20	**1**	±0
Vox (Vox)	3,076	4.09	New	0	±0
Change It Municipalists (CM)	1,419	1.89	New	0	±0
For a Fairer World (PUM+J)	185	0.25	New	0	±0
Blank ballots	673	0.90	−0.98		
**Total**	**75,135**			**27**	**±0**
Valid votes	75,135	99.21	+0.93		
Invalid votes	598	0.79	−0.93		
**Votes cast / turnout**	**75,733**	**67.21**	**−1.28**		
Abstentions	36,949	32.79	+1.28		
**Registered voters**	**112,682**				
Sources
Footnotes: ^{1} United We Can–United Left–Equo results are compared to Change Logroño totals in the 2015 election.

== See also ==
- 2019 Riojan regional election
