= 2019 Spanish local elections in the Basque Country =

This article presents the results breakdown of the local elections held in the Basque Country on 26 May 2019. The following tables show detailed results in the autonomous community's most populous municipalities, sorted alphabetically.

== City control ==
The following table lists party control in the most populous municipalities, including provincial capitals (shown in bold). Gains for a party are displayed with the cell's background shaded in that party's colour.

| Municipality | Population | Previous control | New control |
|---|---|---|---|
| Barakaldo | 100,435 | Basque Nationalist Party (EAJ/PNV) | Basque Nationalist Party (EAJ/PNV) |
| Basauri | 40,762 | Basque Nationalist Party (EAJ/PNV) | Basque Nationalist Party (EAJ/PNV) |
| **Bilbao** | 345,821 | Basque Nationalist Party (EAJ/PNV) | Basque Nationalist Party (EAJ/PNV) |
| **Donostia/San Sebastián** | 186,665 | Basque Nationalist Party (EAJ/PNV) | Basque Nationalist Party (EAJ/PNV) |
| Errenteria | 39,355 | Basque Country Gather (EH Bildu) | Basque Country Gather (EH Bildu) |
| Getxo | 78,276 | Basque Nationalist Party (EAJ/PNV) | Basque Nationalist Party (EAJ/PNV) |
| Irun | 61,983 | Socialist Party of the Basque Country (PSE–EE (PSOE)) | Socialist Party of the Basque Country (PSE–EE (PSOE)) |
| Portugalete | 45,826 | Socialist Party of the Basque Country (PSE–EE (PSOE)) | Socialist Party of the Basque Country (PSE–EE (PSOE)) |
| Santurtzi | 45,795 | Basque Nationalist Party (EAJ/PNV) | Basque Nationalist Party (EAJ/PNV) |
| **Vitoria-Gasteiz** | 249,176 | Basque Nationalist Party (EAJ/PNV) | Basque Nationalist Party (EAJ/PNV) |

== Municipalities ==
=== Barakaldo ===
Population: 100,435

← Summary of the 26 May 2019 City Council of Barakaldo election results →
| Parties and alliances | Popular vote | | | Seats | |
| Parties and alliances | Votes | % | ±pp | Total | +/− |
|---|---|---|---|---|---|
| Basque Nationalist Party (EAJ/PNV) | 19,101 | 38.62 | +11.68 | 11 | +3 |
| Socialist Party of the Basque Country–Basque Country Left (PSE–EE (PSOE)) | 13,341 | 26.98 | +0.15 | 8 | ±0 |
| United We Can (Podemos, Ezker Anitza–IU, Equo Berdeak)^{1} | 6,510 | 13.16 | −3.40 | 4 | ±0 |
| Basque Country Gather (EH Bildu) | 5,683 | 11.49 | −2.71 | 3 | −1 |
| People's Party (PP) | 2,815 | 5.69 | −3.49 | 1 | −2 |
| Citizens–Party of the Citizenry (Cs) | 729 | 1.47 | New | 0 | ±0 |
| Vox (Vox) | 539 | 1.09 | +0.31 | 0 | ±0 |
| European Solidarity Action Party (Solidaria) | 438 | 0.89 | New | 0 | ±0 |
| Blank ballots | 298 | 0.60 | −1.11 | | |
| Total | 49,454 | | | 27 | ±0 |
| Valid votes | 49,454 | 99.42 | +0.87 | | |
| Invalid votes | 287 | 0.58 | −0.87 | | |
| Votes cast / turnout | 49,741 | 62.53 | +3.82 | | |
| Abstentions | 29,807 | 37.47 | −3.82 | | |
| Registered voters | 79,548 | | | | |
Sources
Footnotes: ^{1} United We Can results are compared to the combined totals of Winning Barakaldo and Barakaldo Decides in the 2015 election.

=== Basauri ===
Population: 40,762

← Summary of the 26 May 2019 City Council of Basauri election results →
| Parties and alliances | Popular vote | | | Seats | |
| Parties and alliances | Votes | % | ±pp | Total | +/− |
|---|---|---|---|---|---|
| Basque Nationalist Party (EAJ/PNV) | 8,928 | 43.12 | +2.47 | 10 | ±0 |
| Socialist Party of the Basque Country–Basque Country Left (PSE–EE (PSOE)) | 4,702 | 22.71 | +4.52 | 5 | +1 |
| Basque Country Gather (EH Bildu) | 2,754 | 13.30 | +0.37 | 3 | ±0 |
| United We Can (Podemos, Ezker Anitza–IU, Equo Berdeak)^{1} | 2,211 | 10.68 | −7.72 | 2 | −1 |
| People's Party (PP) | 1,128 | 5.45 | −2.13 | 1 | ±0 |
| Basauri Now (Ahora Basauri Orain) | 595 | 2.87 | New | 0 | ±0 |
| Vox (Vox) | 159 | 0.77 | New | 0 | ±0 |
| Humanist Party (PH) | 79 | 0.38 | −0.53 | 0 | ±0 |
| Blank ballots | 149 | 0.72 | −0.62 | | |
| Total | 20,705 | | | 21 | ±0 |
| Valid votes | 20,705 | 99.25 | +0.48 | | |
| Invalid votes | 157 | 0.75 | −0.48 | | |
| Votes cast / turnout | 20,862 | 62.89 | +2.00 | | |
| Abstentions | 12,312 | 37.11 | −2.00 | | |
| Registered voters | 33,174 | | | | |
Sources
Footnotes: ^{1} United We Can results are compared to the combined totals of Basauri Yes and Winning Basauri in the 2015 election.

=== Bilbao ===
Population: 345,821

← Summary of the 26 May 2019 City Council of Bilbao election results →
| Parties and alliances | Popular vote | | | Seats | |
| Parties and alliances | Votes | % | ±pp | Total | +/− |
|---|---|---|---|---|---|
| Basque Nationalist Party (EAJ/PNV) | 71,822 | 42.69 | +3.35 | 14 | +1 |
| Socialist Party of the Basque Country–Basque Country Left (PSE–EE (PSOE)) | 26,783 | 15.92 | +3.95 | 5 | +1 |
| Basque Country Gather (EH Bildu) | 25,138 | 14.94 | +0.90 | 4 | ±0 |
| United We Can (Podemos, Ezker Anitza–IU, Equo Berdeak)^{1} | 17,661 | 10.50 | +2.03 | 3 | +1 |
| People's Party (PP) | 15,441 | 9.18 | −2.68 | 3 | −1 |
| Citizens–Party of the Citizenry (Cs) | 3,722 | 2.21 | −1.31 | 0 | ±0 |
| Vox (Vox) | 1,910 | 1.14 | +0.77 | 0 | ±0 |
| Bilbaine People, Initiative for Bilbao (BIB) | 1,239 | 0.74 | New | 0 | ±0 |
| Animalist Party Against Mistreatment of Animals (PACMA) | 1,232 | 0.73 | −0.47 | 0 | ±0 |
| Let's Win–Let's Go Bilbao (GGB) | 771 | 0.46 | −6.07 | 0 | −2 |
| Let's Win (Ganemos) | 376 | 0.22 | New | 0 | ±0 |
| For a Fairer World (PUM+J) | 223 | 0.13 | New | 0 | ±0 |
| European Solidarity Action Party (Solidaria) | 170 | 0.10 | New | 0 | ±0 |
| Acting With You–Party for the Society (ACPS) | 138 | 0.08 | New | 0 | ±0 |
| Humanist Party (PH) | 80 | 0.05 | −0.18 | 0 | ±0 |
| Spanish Phalanx of the CNSO (FE de las JONS) | 41 | 0.02 | New | 0 | ±0 |
| Blank ballots | 1,480 | 0.88 | −0.74 | | |
| Total | 168,227 | | | 29 | ±0 |
| Valid votes | 168,227 | 99.44 | +0.36 | | |
| Invalid votes | 941 | 0.56 | −0.36 | | |
| Votes cast / turnout | 169,168 | 61.81 | +2.48 | | |
| Abstentions | 104,543 | 38.19 | −2.48 | | |
| Registered voters | 273,711 | | | | |
Sources
Footnotes: ^{1} United We Can results are compared to New City Council–Bilbao in Common totals in the 2015 election.

=== Donostia/San Sebastián ===
Population: 186,665

← Summary of the 26 May 2019 City Council of Donostia/San Sebastián election results →
| Parties and alliances | Popular vote | | | Seats | |
| Parties and alliances | Votes | % | ±pp | Total | +/− |
|---|---|---|---|---|---|
| Basque Nationalist Party (EAJ/PNV) | 34,065 | 35.46 | +5.81 | 10 | +1 |
| Basque Country Gather (EH Bildu) | 20,367 | 21.20 | +0.29 | 6 | ±0 |
| Socialist Party of the Basque Country–Basque Country Left (PSE–EE (PSOE)) | 16,851 | 17.54 | −6.98 | 5 | −2 |
| People's Party (PP) | 10,340 | 10.76 | +1.29 | 3 | ±0 |
| United We Can (Podemos, Ezker Anitza–IU, Equo Berdeak)^{1} | 9,476 | 9.87 | +2.77 | 3 | +1 |
| Citizens–Party of the Citizenry (Cs) | 1,572 | 1.64 | −2.08 | 0 | ±0 |
| Vox (Vox) | 1,238 | 1.29 | New | 0 | ±0 |
| Animalist Party Against Mistreatment of Animals (PACMA) | 610 | 0.64 | −0.84 | 0 | ±0 |
| Winning Donostia Yes We Can (Ganemos) | 316 | 0.33 | New | 0 | ±0 |
| For a Fairer World (PUM+J) | 196 | 0.20 | New | 0 | ±0 |
| Blank Seats (EB/AZ) | 174 | 0.18 | New | 0 | ±0 |
| Libertarian Party (P–LIB) | 58 | 0.06 | New | 0 | ±0 |
| Blank ballots | 792 | 0.82 | −0.76 | | |
| Total | 96,055 | | | 27 | ±0 |
| Valid votes | 96,055 | 99.42 | +0.20 | | |
| Invalid votes | 563 | 0.58 | −0.20 | | |
| Votes cast / turnout | 96,618 | 65.29 | −1.36 | | |
| Abstentions | 51,358 | 34.71 | +1.36 | | |
| Registered voters | 147,976 | | | | |
Sources
Footnotes: ^{1} United We Can results are compared to Winning Donostia totals in the 2015 election.

=== Errenteria ===
Population: 39,355

← Summary of the 26 May 2019 City Council of Errenteria election results →
| Parties and alliances | Popular vote | | | Seats | |
| Parties and alliances | Votes | % | ±pp | Total | +/− |
|---|---|---|---|---|---|
| Basque Country Gather (EH Bildu) | 6,941 | 36.91 | +5.09 | 9 | +2 |
| Socialist Party of the Basque Country–Basque Country Left (PSE–EE (PSOE)) | 5,273 | 28.04 | −0.24 | 6 | −1 |
| Basque Nationalist Party (EAJ/PNV) | 3,012 | 16.02 | +1.42 | 3 | ±0 |
| United We Can (Podemos, Ezker Anitza–IU, Equo Berdeak)^{1} | 2,656 | 14.12 | −4.73 | 3 | −1 |
| People's Party (PP) | 754 | 4.01 | −0.69 | 0 | ±0 |
| Blank ballots | 170 | 0.90 | −0.87 | | |
| Total | 18,806 | | | 21 | ±0 |
| Valid votes | 18,806 | 99.01 | +0.05 | | |
| Invalid votes | 188 | 0.99 | −0.05 | | |
| Votes cast / turnout | 18,994 | 61.85 | +1.02 | | |
| Abstentions | 11,716 | 38.15 | −1.02 | | |
| Registered voters | 30,710 | | | | |
Sources
Footnotes: ^{1} United We Can results are compared to Winning Errenteria totals in the 2015 election.

=== Getxo ===
Population: 78,276

← Summary of the 26 May 2019 Town Council of Getxo election results →
| Parties and alliances | Popular vote | | | Seats | |
| Parties and alliances | Votes | % | ±pp | Total | +/− |
|---|---|---|---|---|---|
| Basque Nationalist Party (EAJ/PNV) | 16,344 | 39.06 | +4.97 | 11 | +2 |
| People's Party (PP) | 6,881 | 16.45 | −2.15 | 5 | ±0 |
| Basque Country Gather (EH Bildu) | 6,311 | 15.08 | +0.67 | 4 | ±0 |
| Socialist Party of the Basque Country–Basque Country Left (PSE–EE (PSOE)) | 4,420 | 10.56 | +2.94 | 3 | +1 |
| United We Can (Podemos, Ezker Anitza–IU, Equo Berdeak) | 3,334 | 7.97 | New | 2 | +2 |
| Citizens–Party of the Citizenry (Cs) | 1,357 | 3.24 | −2.67 | 0 | −1 |
| Free for the Basque Country (LxE) | 1,150 | 2.75 | New | 0 | ±0 |
| Getxo Municipal Candidacy (GUK) | 860 | 2.06 | −12.47 | 0 | −4 |
| Vox (Vox) | 679 | 1.62 | −0.33 | 0 | ±0 |
| Let's Win (Ganemos) | 110 | 0.26 | New | 0 | ±0 |
| European Solidarity Action Party (Solidaria) | 65 | 0.16 | New | 0 | ±0 |
| Blank ballots | 330 | 0.79 | −1.27 | | |
| Total | 41,841 | | | 25 | ±0 |
| Valid votes | 41,841 | 99.48 | +0.39 | | |
| Invalid votes | 218 | 0.52 | −0.39 | | |
| Votes cast / turnout | 42,059 | 67.51 | +4.05 | | |
| Abstentions | 20,238 | 32.49 | −4.05 | | |
| Registered voters | 62,297 | | | | |

=== Irun ===
Population: 61,983

← Summary of the 26 May 2019 City Council of Irun election results →
| Parties and alliances | Popular vote | | | Seats | |
| Parties and alliances | Votes | % | ±pp | Total | +/− |
|---|---|---|---|---|---|
| Socialist Party of the Basque Country–Basque Country Left (PSE–EE (PSOE)) | 10,172 | 35.73 | +2.31 | 10 | ±0 |
| Basque Nationalist Party (EAJ/PNV) | 7,073 | 24.85 | +6.61 | 7 | +2 |
| United We Can (Podemos, Ezker Anitza–IU)^{1} | 4,391 | 15.42 | −6.86 | 4 | −1 |
| Basque Country Gather (EH Bildu) | 3,939 | 13.84 | +1.43 | 3 | ±0 |
| People's Party (PP) | 1,552 | 5.45 | −2.36 | 1 | −1 |
| Citizens–Party of the Citizenry (Cs) | 655 | 2.30 | −1.40 | 0 | ±0 |
| Vox (Vox) | 448 | 1.57 | New | 0 | ±0 |
| Blank ballots | 237 | 0.83 | −0.46 | | |
| Total | 28,467 | | | 25 | ±0 |
| Valid votes | 28,467 | 99.32 | +0.23 | | |
| Invalid votes | 194 | 0.68 | −0.23 | | |
| Votes cast / turnout | 28,661 | 60.78 | +0.30 | | |
| Abstentions | 18,498 | 39.22 | −0.30 | | |
| Registered voters | 47,159 | | | | |
Sources
Footnotes: ^{1} United We Can results are compared to the combined totals of Yes We Can Irun and Winning Irun in the 2015 election.

=== Portugalete ===
Population: 45,826

← Summary of the 26 May 2019 City Council of Portugalete election results →
| Parties and alliances | Popular vote | | | Seats | |
| Parties and alliances | Votes | % | ±pp | Total | +/− |
|---|---|---|---|---|---|
| Socialist Party of the Basque Country–Basque Country Left (PSE–EE (PSOE)) | 10,545 | 43.41 | +9.71 | 10 | +1 |
| Basque Nationalist Party (EAJ/PNV) | 6,010 | 24.74 | +2.49 | 5 | ±0 |
| United We Can (Podemos, Ezker Anitza–IU, Equo Berdeak)^{1} | 3,033 | 12.49 | −6.98 | 3 | ±0 |
| Basque Country Gather (EH Bildu) | 2,941 | 12.11 | +0.07 | 2 | −1 |
| People's Party (PP) | 1,377 | 5.67 | −1.65 | 1 | ±0 |
| Vox (Vox) | 198 | 0.82 | New | 0 | ±0 |
| Blank ballots | 185 | 0.76 | −0.54 | | |
| Total | 24,289 | | | 21 | ±0 |
| Valid votes | 24,289 | 99.47 | +1.00 | | |
| Invalid votes | 129 | 0.53 | −1.00 | | |
| Votes cast / turnout | 24,418 | 64.22 | +2.25 | | |
| Abstentions | 13,605 | 35.78 | −2.25 | | |
| Registered voters | 38,023 | | | | |
Sources
Footnotes: ^{1} United We Can results are compared to the combined totals of Awake Portugalete People and Winning Portugalete in the 2015 election.

=== Santurtzi ===
Population: 45,725

← Summary of the 26 May 2019 City Council of Santurtzi election results →
| Parties and alliances | Popular vote | | | Seats | |
| Parties and alliances | Votes | % | ±pp | Total | +/− |
|---|---|---|---|---|---|
| Basque Nationalist Party (EAJ/PNV) | 9,819 | 41.42 | +1.26 | 10 | ±0 |
| Socialist Party of the Basque Country–Basque Country Left (PSE–EE (PSOE)) | 5,041 | 21.27 | +5.99 | 5 | +2 |
| Basque Country Gather (EH Bildu) | 4,256 | 17.95 | +2.36 | 4 | +1 |
| United We Can (Podemos, Ezker Anitza–IU, Equo Berdeak)^{1} | 2,576 | 10.87 | +6.89 | 2 | +2 |
| People's Party (PP) | 1,097 | 4.63 | −1.34 | 0 | −1 |
| Yes We Can More Santurtzi (SSP+Stz) | 528 | 2.23 | −14.01 | 0 | −4 |
| Vox (Vox) | 187 | 0.79 | New | 0 | ±0 |
| Blank ballots | 201 | 0.85 | −0.58 | | |
| Total | 23,705 | | | 21 | ±0 |
| Valid votes | 23,705 | 99.22 | +0.43 | | |
| Invalid votes | 187 | 0.78 | −0.43 | | |
| Votes cast / turnout | 23,892 | 63.84 | +3.36 | | |
| Abstentions | 13,534 | 36.16 | −3.36 | | |
| Registered voters | 37,426 | | | | |
Sources
Footnotes: ^{1} United We Can results are compared to Winning Santurtzi totals in the 2015 election.

=== Vitoria-Gasteiz ===
Population: 249,176

← Summary of the 26 May 2019 City Council of Vitoria-Gasteiz election results →
| Parties and alliances | Popular vote | | | Seats | |
| Parties and alliances | Votes | % | ±pp | Total | +/− |
|---|---|---|---|---|---|
| Basque Nationalist Party (EAJ/PNV) | 28,241 | 23.64 | +7.00 | 7 | +2 |
| Socialist Party of the Basque Country–Basque Country Left (PSE–EE (PSOE)) | 25,524 | 21.37 | +9.43 | 6 | +2 |
| Basque Country Gather (EH Bildu) | 24,529 | 20.54 | +1.00 | 6 | ±0 |
| People's Party (PP) | 22,096 | 18.50 | −11.30 | 5 | −4 |
| United We Can–Winning (Podemos, Ezker Anitza–IU, Equo Berdeak)^{1} | 11,774 | 9.86 | −3.92 | 3 | ±0 |
| Citizens–Party of the Citizenry (Cs) | 3,041 | 2.55 | −0.65 | 0 | ±0 |
| Vox (Vox) | 1,704 | 1.43 | +1.14 | 0 | ±0 |
| Free for the Basque Country (LxE) | 958 | 0.80 | New | 0 | ±0 |
| For a Fairer World (PUM+J) | 348 | 0.29 | New | 0 | ±0 |
| Blank Seats (EB/AZ) | 289 | 0.24 | −0.46 | 0 | ±0 |
| Welcome (Ongi Etorri) | 110 | 0.09 | −0.16 | 0 | ±0 |
| Blank ballots | 824 | 0.69 | −0.55 | | |
| Total | 119,438 | | | 27 | ±0 |
| Valid votes | 119,438 | 99.21 | +0.51 | | |
| Invalid votes | 947 | 0.79 | −0.51 | | |
| Votes cast / turnout | 120,385 | 63.25 | −1.51 | | |
| Abstentions | 69,961 | 36.75 | +1.51 | | |
| Registered voters | 190,346 | | | | |
Sources
Footnotes: ^{1} United We Can–Winning results are compared to the combined totals of Adding Up and Winning Gasteiz in the 2015 election.
