= 2023 Spanish local elections in the Basque Country =

This article presents the results breakdown of the local elections held in the Basque Country on 28 May 2023. The following tables show detailed results in the autonomous community's most populous municipalities, sorted alphabetically.

== City control ==
The following table lists party control in the most populous municipalities, including provincial capitals (shown in bold). Gains for a party are displayed with the cell's background shaded in that party's colour.

Municipality	Population	Previous control	New control
Barakaldo	100,535	Basque Nationalist Party (EAJ/PNV)	Basque Nationalist Party (EAJ/PNV)
Basauri	40,324	Basque Nationalist Party (EAJ/PNV)	Basque Nationalist Party (EAJ/PNV)
**Bilbao**	344,127	Basque Nationalist Party (EAJ/PNV)	Basque Nationalist Party (EAJ/PNV)
**Donostia/San Sebastián**	187,849	Basque Nationalist Party (EAJ/PNV)	Basque Nationalist Party (EAJ/PNV)
Errenteria	39,023	Basque Country Gather (EH Bildu)	Basque Country Gather (EH Bildu)
Getxo	76,365	Basque Nationalist Party (EAJ/PNV)	Basque Nationalist Party (EAJ/PNV)
Irun	62,635	Socialist Party of the Basque Country (PSE–EE (PSOE))	Socialist Party of the Basque Country (PSE–EE (PSOE))
Portugalete	44,800	Socialist Party of the Basque Country (PSE–EE (PSOE))	Socialist Party of the Basque Country (PSE–EE (PSOE))
Santurtzi	45,749	Basque Nationalist Party (EAJ/PNV)	Basque Nationalist Party (EAJ/PNV)
**Vitoria-Gasteiz**	253,672	Basque Nationalist Party (EAJ/PNV)	Socialist Party of the Basque Country (PSE–EE (PSOE))

== Municipalities ==
=== Barakaldo ===
Population: 100,535

← Summary of the 28 May 2023 City Council of Barakaldo election results →
Parties and alliances	Popular vote			Seats	
Parties and alliances	Votes	%	±pp	Total	+/−
Basque Nationalist Party (EAJ/PNV)	15,541	36.04	−2.58	11	±0
Socialist Party of the Basque Country–Basque Country Left (PSE–EE (PSOE))	10,554	24.47	−2.51	7	−1
Basque Country Gather (EH Bildu)	6,863	15.91	+4.42	5	+2
United We Can (Podemos, Ezker Anitza–IU, AV)	3,740	8.67	−4.49	2	−2
People's Party (PP)	3,093	7.17	+1.48	2	+1
Vox (Vox)	1,258	2.92	+1.87	0	±0
Voices of Barakaldo (Barakaldoko Ahotsak)	1,060	2.46	New	0	±0
European Solidarity Action Party (Solidaria)	308	0.71	−0.18	0	±0
Blank ballots	707	1.64	+1.04		
Total	43,124			27	±0
Valid votes	43,124	98.67	−0.75		
Invalid votes	581	1.33	+0.75		
Votes cast / turnout	43,705	55.98	−6.55		
Abstentions	34,368	44.02	+6.55		
Registered voters	78,073				

=== Basauri ===
Population: 40,324

← Summary of the 28 May 2023 City Council of Basauri election results →
Parties and alliances	Popular vote			Seats	
Parties and alliances	Votes	%	±pp	Total	+/−
Basque Nationalist Party (EAJ/PNV)	7,013	39.32	−3.80	9	−1
Socialist Party of the Basque Country–Basque Country Left (PSE–EE (PSOE))	4,027	22.58	−0.13	5	±0
Basque Country Gather (EH Bildu)	3,499	19.62	+6.32	4	+1
United We Can (Podemos, Ezker Anitza–IU, Berdeak Equo, AV)	1,449	8.12	−2.56	2	±0
People's Party (PP)	1,338	7.50	+2.05	1	±0
Humanist Party (PH)	206	1.16	+0.78	0	±0
Blank ballots	302	1.69	+0.97		
Total	17,834			21	±0
Valid votes	17,834	98.49	−0.76		
Invalid votes	274	1.51	+0.76		
Votes cast / turnout	18,108	55.74	−7.15		
Abstentions	14,381	44.26	+7.15		
Registered voters	32,489				

=== Bilbao ===
Population: 344,127

← Summary of the 28 May 2023 City Council of Bilbao election results →
Parties and alliances	Popular vote			Seats	
Parties and alliances	Votes	%	±pp	Total	+/−
Basque Nationalist Party (EAJ/PNV)	54,426	36.57	−6.12	12	−2
Basque Country Gather (EH Bildu)	28,110	18.89	+3.95	6	+2
Socialist Party of the Basque Country–Basque Country Left (PSE–EE (PSOE))	24,350	16.36	+0.44	5	±0
People's Party (PP)	17,951	12.06	+2.88	4	+1
United We Can (Podemos, Ezker Anitza–IU, Berdeak Equo, AV)	11,883	7.98	−2.52	2	−1
Vox (Vox)	5,049	3.39	+2.25	0	±0
Animalist Party with the Environment (PACMA)^{1}	1,600	1.08	+0.35	0	±0
Blank Seats to Leave Empty Seats (EB/AZ)	877	0.59	New	0	±0
For a Fairer World (PUM+J)	613	0.41	+0.28	0	±0
Stop (Stop)	459	0.31	New	0	±0
Citizens–Party of the Citizenry (CS)	342	0.23	−1.98	0	±0
Communist Party of the Workers of Spain (PCTE)	315	0.21	New	0	±0
Humanist Party (PH)	158	0.11	+0.06	0	±0
Blank ballots	2,689	1.81	+0.93		
Total	148,822			29	±0
Valid votes	148,822	98.49	−0.76		
Invalid votes	1,660	1.51	+0.76		
Votes cast / turnout	150,482	56.15	−5.66		
Abstentions	117,502	43.85	+5.66		
Registered voters	267,984				
Sources
Footnotes: ^{1} Animalist Party with the Environment results are compared to Animalist Party Against Mistreatment of Animals totals in the 2019 election.

=== Donostia/San Sebastián ===
Population: 187,849

← Summary of the 28 May 2023 City Council of Donostia/San Sebastián election results →
Parties and alliances	Popular vote			Seats	
Parties and alliances	Votes	%	±pp	Total	+/−
Basque Nationalist Party (EAJ/PNV)	24,481	27.95	−7.51	9	−1
Basque Country Gather (EH Bildu)	23,400	26.72	+5.52	8	+2
Socialist Party of the Basque Country–Basque Country Left (PSE–EE (PSOE))	16,263	18.57	+1.03	5	±0
People's Party (PP)	10,581	12.08	+1.32	3	±0
United We Can (Podemos, Ezker Anitza–IU, Berdeak Equo, AV)	7,074	8.08	−1.79	2	−1
Vox (Vox)	2,063	2.36	+1.07	0	±0
Animalist Party with the Environment (PACMA)^{1}	881	1.01	+0.37	0	±0
Blank Seats to Leave Empty Seats (EB/AZ)	576	0.66	+0.48	0	±0
Stop (Stop)	322	0.37	New	0	±0
Citizens–Party of the Citizenry (CS)	169	0.19	−1.45	0	±0
For a Fairer World (PUM+J)	154	0.18	−0.02	0	±0
Blank ballots	1,626	1.86	+1.04		
Total	87,590			27	±0
Valid votes	87,590	99.22	−0.20		
Invalid votes	685	0.78	+0.20		
Votes cast / turnout	88,275	59.92	−5.37		
Abstentions	59,043	40.08	+5.37		
Registered voters	147,318				
Sources
Footnotes: ^{1} Animalist Party with the Environment results are compared to Animalist Party Against Mistreatment of Animals totals in the 2019 election.

=== Errenteria ===
Population: 39,023

← Summary of the 28 May 2023 City Council of Errenteria election results →
Parties and alliances	Popular vote			Seats	
Parties and alliances	Votes	%	±pp	Total	+/−
Basque Country Gather (EH Bildu)	6,736	41.15	+4.24	9	±0
Socialist Party of the Basque Country–Basque Country Left (PSE–EE (PSOE))	4,533	27.69	−0.35	6	±0
Basque Nationalist Party (EAJ/PNV)	2,498	15.26	−0.76	3	±0
United We Can (Podemos, Ezker Anitza–IU, AV)	1,402	8.56	−5.56	2	−1
People's Party (PP)	912	5.57	+1.56	1	+1
Blank ballots	288	1.76	+0.86		
Total	16,369			21	±0
Valid votes	16,369	98.89	−0.20		
Invalid votes	183	1.11	+0.20		
Votes cast / turnout	16,552	54.26	−7.59		
Abstentions	13,955	45.74	+7.59		
Registered voters	30,507				

=== Getxo ===
Population: 76,365

← Summary of the 28 May 2023 City Council of Getxo election results →
Parties and alliances	Popular vote			Seats	
Parties and alliances	Votes	%	±pp	Total	+/−
Basque Nationalist Party (EAJ/PNV)	11,940	31.71	−7.35	9	−2
People's Party (PP)	8,171	21.71	+5.26	6	+1
Basque Country Gather (EH Bildu)	7,594	20.17	+5.09	6	+2
Socialist Party of the Basque Country–Basque Country Left (PSE–EE (PSOE))	3,885	10.32	−0.24	3	±0
United We Can (Podemos, Ezker Anitza–IU, AV)	2,102	5.58	−2.39	1	−1
Free for the Basque Country (LxE)	1,726	4.58	+1.83	0	±0
Vox (Vox)	1,280	3.40	+1.78	0	±0
Stop (Stop)	246	0.65	New	0	±0
Blank ballots	704	1.87	+1.08		
Total	37,648			25	±0
Valid votes	37,648	99.07	−0.41		
Invalid votes	354	0.93	+0.41		
Votes cast / turnout	38,002	62.35	−5.16		
Abstentions	22,952	37.65	+5.16		
Registered voters	60,954				

=== Irun ===
Population: 62,635

← Summary of the 28 May 2023 City Council of Irun election results →
Parties and alliances	Popular vote			Seats	
Parties and alliances	Votes	%	±pp	Total	+/−
Socialist Party of the Basque Country–Basque Country Left (PSE–EE (PSOE))	8,240	32.65	−3.08	10	±0
Basque Nationalist Party (EAJ/PNV)	5,795	22.97	−1.88	7	±0
Basque Country Gather (EH Bildu)	4,057	16.08	+2.24	4	+1
United We Can (Podemos, Ezker Anitza–IU, AV)	2,316	9.18	−6.24	2	−2
People's Party (PP)	2,144	8.50	+3.05	2	+1
Vox (Vox)	1,227	4.86	+3.29	0	±0
Irun Advances from the Irun List (IZAIA)	1,028	4.07	New	0	±0
Blank ballots	427	1.69	+0.86		
Total	25,234			25	±0
Valid votes	25,234	98.70	−0.62		
Invalid votes	333	1.30	+0.62		
Votes cast / turnout	25,567	54.07	−6.71		
Abstentions	21,715	45.93	+6.71		
Registered voters	47,282				

=== Portugalete ===
Population: 44,800

← Summary of the 28 May 2023 City Council of Portugalete election results →
Parties and alliances	Popular vote			Seats	
Parties and alliances	Votes	%	±pp	Total	+/−
Socialist Party of the Basque Country–Basque Country Left (PSE–EE (PSOE))	9,676	46.19	+2.78	11	+1
Basque Nationalist Party (EAJ/PNV)	4,501	21.49	−3.25	5	±0
Basque Country Gather (EH Bildu)	3,369	16.08	+3.97	3	+1
United We Can (Podemos, Ezker Anitza–IU, Berdeak Equo, AV)	1,386	6.62	−5.87	1	−2
People's Party (PP)	1,291	6.16	+0.49	1	±0
Vox (Vox)	401	1.91	+1.09	0	±0
Blank ballots	323	1.54	+0.78		
Total	20,947			21	±0
Valid votes	20,947	98.75	−0.72		
Invalid votes	266	1.25	+0.72		
Votes cast / turnout	21,213	58.27	−5.95		
Abstentions	15,193	41.73	+5.95		
Registered voters	36,406				

=== Santurtzi ===
Population: 45,749

← Summary of the 28 May 2023 City Council of Santurtzi election results →
Parties and alliances	Popular vote			Seats	
Parties and alliances	Votes	%	±pp	Total	+/−
Basque Nationalist Party (EAJ/PNV)	6,795	32.16	−9.26	7	−3
Basque Country Gather (EH Bildu)	5,682	26.89	+8.94	6	+2
Socialist Party of the Basque Country–Basque Country Left (PSE–EE (PSOE))	4,864	23.02	+1.75	5	±0
United We Can (Podemos, Ezker Anitza–IU, Berdeak Equo, AV)	1,747	8.27	−2.60	2	±0
People's Party (PP)	1,214	5.75	+1.12	1	+1
Vox (Vox)	453	2.14	+1.35	0	±0
Blank ballots	373	1.77	+0.92		
Total	21,128			21	±0
Valid votes	21,128	98.51	−0.71		
Invalid votes	320	1.49	+0.71		
Votes cast / turnout	21,448	57.94	−5.90		
Abstentions	15,568	42.06	+5.90		
Registered voters	37,016				

=== Vitoria-Gasteiz ===
Population: 253,672

← Summary of the 28 May 2023 City Council of Vitoria-Gasteiz election results →
Parties and alliances	Popular vote			Seats	
Parties and alliances	Votes	%	±pp	Total	+/−
Basque Country Gather (EH Bildu)	24,845	22.80	+2.26	7	+1
Socialist Party of the Basque Country–Basque Country Left (PSE–EE (PSOE))	23,909	21.94	+0.57	6	±0
People's Party (PP)	21,853	20.05	+1.55	6	+1
Basque Nationalist Party (EAJ/PNV)	21,454	19.69	−3.95	6	−1
United We Can (Podemos, Ezker Anitza–IU, Berdeak Equo, AV)	7,742	7.10	−2.76	2	−1
Vox (Vox)	4,194	3.85	+2.42	0	±0
Free for the Basque Country (LxE)	1,619	1.49	+0.69	0	±0
Blank Seats to Leave Empty Seats (EB/AZ)	951	0.87	+0.63	0	±0
For a Fairer World (PUM+J)	475	0.44	+0.15	0	±0
Citizens–Party of the Citizenry (CS)	260	0.24	−2.31	0	±0
Welcome (Ongi Etorri)	247	0.23	+0.14	0	±0
Blank ballots	1,437	1.32	+0.63		
Total	108,986			27	±0
Valid votes	108,986	98.51	−0.70		
Invalid votes	1,647	1.49	+0.70		
Votes cast / turnout	110,633	58.12	−5.13		
Abstentions	79,730	41.88	+5.13		
Registered voters	190,363				
