= Opinion polling for the 2019 Spanish local elections (Catalonia) =

In the run up to the 2019 Spanish local elections, various organisations carried out opinion polling to gauge voting intention in local entities in Spain. Results of such polls for municipalities in Catalonia are displayed in this article. The date range for these opinion polls is from the previous local elections, held on 24 May 2015, to the day the next elections were held, on 26 May 2019.

Polls are listed in reverse chronological order, showing the most recent first and using the dates when the survey fieldwork was done, as opposed to the date of publication. Where the fieldwork dates are unknown, the date of publication is given instead. The highest percentage figure in each polling survey is displayed with its background shaded in the leading party's colour. If a tie ensues, this is applied to the figures with the highest percentages. The "Lead" columns on the right shows the percentage-point difference between the parties with the highest percentages in a given poll.

== Municipalities ==
=== Badalona ===
Polling firm/Commissioner	Fieldwork date	Sample size	Turnout	PP	GBC	PSC	ERC	PDeCAT	ICV–EUiA	Cs	BComúP–ECG	JxCat	Vox	Lead
2019 municipal election	26 May 2019	—N/a	63.9	37.6; 11	24.5; 7	19.9; 6	(Note: Within GBC.)	(Note: Within JxCat.)	(Note: Within En Comú–ECG.)	1.8; 0	8.5; 2	5.2; 1	0.4; 0	13.1
GESOP/El Periódico	17 May 2019	?	?	33.8; 10/11	23.0; 6/7	22.5; 6/7				2.1; 0	11.1; 3	5.1; 0/1	–	10.8
Numeral8/PSC	3–10 May 2019	800	?	25.0; 7/8	25.0; 7/8	24.8; 7/8				5.1; 0/1	6.8; 1/2	3.8; 0/1	3.3; 0	Tie
OKDiario	29–30 Apr 2019	801	?	? 11	? 6	? 4/5				? 2	? 2/3	? 1	–	?
2015 municipal election	24 May 2015	—N/a	57.5	34.2; 10	17.5; 5	14.1; 4	11.0; 3	7.9 (Note: Results for CiU.); 2	6.7; 2	5.6; 1	–	–	–	16.7

=== Castelldefels ===
Polling firm/Commissioner	Fieldwork date	Sample size	Turnout	PP	PSC	MC	ERC	Cs	PDeCAT	CSPOT	JxCat	Lead
2019 municipal election	26 May 2019	—N/a	61.6	29.3; 8	20.1; 6	16.0; 4	15.9; 4	6.6; 2		(Note: Within Movem Castelldefels.)	5.6; 1	9.2
GESOP/City Council of Castelldefels	22 Nov–7 Dec 2018	601	?	28.0– 29.0; 8/9	16.5– 17.5; 5	16.5– 17.5; 5	12.0– 13.0; 3/4	7.0– 8.0; 2	5.0– 6.0; 1		–	11.5
2015 municipal election	24 May 2015	—N/a	56.1	27.2; 8	15.9; 4	15.7; 4	10.4; 3	8.9; 2	8.6; 2	7.9; 2	–	11.3

=== L'Hospitalet de Llobregat ===
Polling firm/Commissioner	Fieldwork date	Sample size	Turnout	PSC	Cs	ICV–EUiA	PP	ERC	G	PDeCAT	CUP	LHECP–ECG	JxCat	Lead
2019 municipal election	26 May 2019	—N/a	57.5	43.3; 14	11.8; 4		5.2; 1	16.2; 5			2.0; 0	11.2; 3	3.5; 0	27.1
GESOP/El Periódico	14 May 2019	?	?	40.3; 12/13	12.7; 4		5.3; 0/1	13.8; 4/5			2.3; 0	11.6; 3/4	5.9; 1/2	26.5
2015 municipal election	24 May 2015	—N/a	53.4	33.2; 11	13.2; 4	10.2; 3	9.9; 3	9.0; 2	7.5; 2	6.0; 1	5.1; 1	–	–	20.0

=== Lleida ===
Polling firm/Commissioner	Fieldwork date	Sample size	Turnout	PSC	PDeCAT	Cs	ERC	CUP	PP	Comú	JxCat	Lead
2019 municipal election	26 May 2019	—N/a	60.7	23.6; 7		9.8; 3	23.8; 7	4.3; 0	6.1; 2	8.7; 2	19.1; 6	0.2
Infortécnica/UA1 Ràdio	12 Jun 2018	?	?	? 7	? 6/7	? 6	? 3/4	? 0/2	? 1/2	? 0/2	–	?
Infortécnica/UA1 Ràdio	26 Jun 2017	1,500	?	? 7/8	? 4/5	? 4/5	? 4/5	? 2	? 2/3	? 2/3	–	?
2015 municipal election	24 May 2015	—N/a	54.5	24.7; 8	17.9; 6	11.9; 4	11.3; 3	8.8; 2	8.7; 2	7.6; 2	–	6.8

=== Mollet del Vallès ===
Polling firm/Commissioner	Fieldwork date	Sample size	Turnout	PSC	CM	ERC	Cs	PDeCAT	PP	CUP	Podemos/Podem	MEC–ECG	JxCat	Lead
2019 municipal election	26 May 2019	—N/a	61.2	34.9; 10		23.0; 6	9.4; 2		4.3; 0	1.6; 0	7.7; 2	13.5; 4	5.0; 1	11.9
Opinòmetre/somMollet	7–13 Mar 2019	400	?	? 6/7		? 6/7	? 3	? 2	? 0	–	? 3/4	? 3/4	–	Tie
Opinòmetre/somMollet	9–15 Jul 2018	300	?	? 7	? 5/6	? 6/7	? 3/4	? 2	? 0	–	(Note: Within Canviem Mollet.)	–	–	?
Opinòmetre/somMollet	12 May 2017	?	?	? 6/7	? 6	? 6	? 3/4	? 1	? 1	? 1		–	–	?
2015 municipal election	24 May 2015	—N/a	55.3	26.4; 7	24.0; 7	16.7; 5	11.2; 3	7.9; 2	6.5; 1	3.4; 0		–	–	2.4

=== Reus ===
Polling firm/Commissioner	Fieldwork date	Sample size	Turnout	PDeCAT	CUP	Cs	PSC	ERC	PP	Ara	JxCat	Lead
2019 municipal election	26 May 2019	—N/a	60.7		8.7; 3	10.7; 3	16.9; 6	17.1; 6	4.7; 0	6.4; 2	22.2; 7	5.1
Diari de Tarragona	28 Apr 2018	?	?	? 3/5	? 2/3	? 7/9	? 2	? 3/5	? 1	? 1/2	–	?
2015 municipal election	24 May 2015	—N/a	55.3	21.4; 7	17.7; 6	14.4; 4	13.8; 4	8.7; 2	8.1; 2	6.3; 2	–	3.7

=== Rubí ===
Polling firm/Commissioner	Fieldwork date	Sample size	Turnout	PSC	ERC	Cs	AUP	ICV–EUiA	PDeCAT	PP	VR	ECP Rubí–ECG	JxCat	Lead
2019 municipal election	26 May 2019	—N/a	57.7	33.0; 10	22.8; 7	10.4; 3	5.1; 1			3.7; 0	6.5; 1	10.7; 3	4.3; 0	10.2
Dialoga/PSC	3–7 Sep 2018	800	?	? 7/9	? 5/7	? 4/6	? 2/3		? 0/1	? 1/2	? 0	? 0/1	–	?
Opinòmetre/ERC	24–30 May 2018	450	?	? 4/5	? 6/7	? 5	? 3		? 1/2	? 0/1	? 0/1	? 2/3	–	?
2015 municipal election	24 May 2015	—N/a	51.0	20.7; 6	15.5; 5	14.3; 4	10.4; 3	9.3 (Note: Results for ICV.); 2	8.7; 2	8.5; 2	5.7; 1	–	–	5.2

=== Sant Feliu de Llobregat ===
Polling firm/Commissioner	Fieldwork date	Sample size	Turnout	ICV–EUiA	PSC	ERC	Cs	PDeCAT	VxSF	PP	Podemos/Podem	SFECP–ECG	JxCat	Lead
2019 municipal election	26 May 2019	—N/a	66.2		23.7; 6	21.3; 5	10.1; 2		5.7; 1	3.9; 0		21.5; 5	8.3; 2	2.2
GESOP/City Council of Sant Feliu	12–19 Nov 2018	800	?		19.5– 20.5; 4/5	16.5– 17.5; 4	13.0– 14.0; 3	7.0– 8.0; 1/2	6.5– 7.5; 1/2	4.5– 5.5; 0/1		25.5– 26.5; 6/7	–	6.0
2015 municipal election	24 May 2015	—N/a	58.3	23.7; 6	19.3; 4	12.7; 3	10.7; 2	10.0; 2	7.7; 2	7.6; 1	6.6 (Note: Results for JSF.); 1	–	–	4.4

=== Sabadell ===
Polling firm/Commissioner	Fieldwork date	Sample size	Turnout	PSC	Podemos/Podem	ERC	CpSBD	Junts	Cs	GS	PP	SBDeC–ECG	Lead
2019 municipal election	26 May 2019	—N/a	62.5	29.9; 10	5.2; 1	20.0; 7	11.1; 3	9.3; 3	10.2; 3	0.1; 0	2.9; 0	4.0; 0	9.9
Opinòmetre/Diari de Sabadell	18 May 2019	?	?	13.8; 6	? 1/2	17.8; 6	? 3/4	? 3	? 3	? 1/2	? 0	? 2	4.0
2015 municipal election	24 May 2015	—N/a	58.3	15.4; 5	15.0; 4	14.8; 4	13.2; 4	13.2; 4	12.0; 3	6.4; 2	5.7; 1	–	0.4

=== Torelló ===
Polling firm/Commissioner	Fieldwork date	Sample size	Turnout	PDeCAT	ERC	CUP	EIO	PSC	JxCat	Lead
2019 municipal election	26 May 2019	—N/a	66.7		39.2; 7	26.2; 5	–	13.6; 2	15.3; 3	13.0
Ona Digital Osona	1 Jun 2018	?	?		53.0	18.0	2.0	–	20.0	33.0
2015 municipal election	24 May 2015	—N/a	54.8	34.2; 7	19.4; 3	16.0; 3	10.7; 2	10.7; 2	–	14.8

=== Vic ===
Polling firm/Commissioner	Fieldwork date	Sample size	Turnout	PDeCAT	ERC	CUP	PSC	PLVI	ICV–EUiA	Cs	JxCat	VECPodem–ECG	Lead
2019 municipal election	26 May 2019	—N/a	66.1		19.4; 5	15.3; 4	6.1; 1	2.9; 0		3.8; 0	43.4; 11	4.7; 0	24.0
Ona Digital Osona	1 Jun 2018	?	?		27.0	24.0	–	–	2.4	20.0	24.0	–	3.0
2015 municipal election	24 May 2015	—N/a	56.8	35.4; 9	20.8; 5	16.9 (Note: Results for Capgirem Vic.); 4	6.7; 1	5.6; 1	5.1; 1	–	–	–	14.6
