= Opinion polling for the 2023 Spanish local elections (Catalonia) =

In the run up to the 2023 Spanish local elections, various organisations carried out opinion polling to gauge voting intention in local entities in Spain. Results of such polls for municipalities in Catalonia are displayed in this article. The date range for these opinion polls is from the previous local elections, held on 26 May 2019, to the day the next elections were held, on 28 May 2023.

Polls are listed in reverse chronological order, showing the most recent first and using the dates when the survey fieldwork was done, as opposed to the date of publication. Where the fieldwork dates are unknown, the date of publication is given instead. The highest percentage figure in each polling survey is displayed with its background shaded in the leading party's colour. If a tie ensues, this is applied to the figures with the highest percentages. The "Lead" columns on the right shows the percentage-point difference between the parties with the highest percentages in a given poll.

== Municipalities ==
=== Badalona ===
Polling firm/Commissioner	Fieldwork date	Sample size	Turnout	PP	GBC	PSC	ECP	JxCat Junts	CS	Vox	ERC	Valents	Centrem	Lead
2023 municipal election	28 May 2023	—N/a	58.1	55.7; 18	6.1; 1	14.6; 4	7.0; 2	4.8; 0	0.3; 0	1.3; 0	7.6; 2	0.6; 0	–	41.1
EM-Analytics/GMG	5 Apr–12 May 2023	2,753	?	41.3; 13	5.2; 1	15.9; 5	8.0; 2	5.9; 1	0.9; 0	1.8; 0	18.1; 5	1.0; 0	–	23.2
EM-Analytics/GMG	5 Feb–4 Apr 2023	2,295	?	38.8; 12	4.5; 0	17.1; 5	7.2; 2	6.2; 2	1.1; 0	2.1; 0	19.1; 6	0.9; 0	–	19.7
EM-Analytics/GMG	23 Oct–4 Feb 2023	1,881	?	40.7; 13	4.2; 0	16.6; 5	7.9; 2	6.1; 1	0.9; 0	1.5; 0	18.5; 6	1.0; 0	–	22.2
EM-Analytics/GMG	13 Jul–14 Aug 2022	1,234	?	38.3; 12	4.1; 0	17.5; 5	7.9; 2	6.2; 2	1.2; 0	1.6; 0	20.1; 6	1.5; 0	0.7; 0	18.2
EM-Analytics/GMG	2–19 May 2022	802	?	36.8; 11	4.6; 0	18.1; 5	7.4; 2	6.4; 2	1.6; 0	1.7; 0	21.7; 7	1.3; 0	0.5; 0	15.1
GAD3/PP	May 2021	?	?	46.4; 14	7.9; 2	15.0; 4	6.0; 1	5.7; 1	0.8; 0	1.3; 0	15.5; 5	–	–	30.9
ElectoPanel/Electomanía	1 Apr–15 Jun 2020	?	?	37.9; 12	4.9; 0	17.7; 5	8.0; 2	6.5; 2	–	–	20.1; 6	–	–	17.8
2019 municipal election	26 May 2019	—N/a	63.9	37.6; 11	24.5; 7	19.9; 6	8.5; 2	5.2; 1	1.8; 0	0.4; 0	(Note: Within GBC.)	–	–	13.1

=== Castelldefels ===
Polling firm/Commissioner	Fieldwork date	Sample size	Turnout	PP	PSC	ECP	ERC	CS	JxCat Junts	Vox	Valents	SFELS	Lead
2023 municipal election	28 May 2023	—N/a	56.7	42.1; 12	15.2; 4	10.6; 3	8.2; 2	0.5; 0	5.0; 1	3.6; 0	0.6; 0	10.8; 3	26.9
EM-Analytics/GMG	1 Apr–12 May 2023	900	?	33.1; 10	20.7; 6	13.1; 4	16.1; 4	2.2; 0	6.4; 1	3.5; 0	2.6; 0	–	12.4
Taforasía/El Llobregat	3–10 Mar 2023	?	63	? 12	? 4	? 4	? 4	2.7; 0	? 1	–	–	–	?
NC Report/PP	Nov–Dec 2022	600	?	? 12	? 5	? 4	? 3	–	? 1	–	–	–	?
EM-Analytics/GMG	12 Jul–22 Nov 2022	480	?	32.3; 9	20.6; 6	14.9; 4	17.5; 5	1.7; 0	6.0; 1	2.1; 0	2.5; 0	–	11.7
2019 municipal election	26 May 2019	—N/a	61.6	29.3; 8	20.1; 6	16.0; 4	15.9; 4	6.6; 2	5.6; 1	1.0; 0	–	–	9.2

=== Cornellà de Llobregat ===
Polling firm/Commissioner	Fieldwork date	Sample size	Turnout	PSC	ERC	CS	Podemos	ECP	PP	CUP	JxCat Junts	Vox	Valents	Lead
2023 municipal election	28 May 2023	—N/a	51.7	43.4; 13	12.9; 4	2.4; 0	3.5; 0	10.1; 3	9.6; 3	3.3; 0	3.1; 0	8.4; 2	1.5; 0	30.5
Taforasía/El Llobregat	3–10 Mar 2023	?	63	46.1; 14	12.8; 4	4.1; 0	8.3; 2	7.3; 2	7.4; 2	–	–	6.3; 1	–	33.3
EM-Analytics/GMG	1 Jan–13 Mar 2023	427	?	48.4; 15	17.0; 5	3.4; 0	6.2; 2	6.3; 2	6.0; 1	5.0; 0	4.1; 0	3.0; 0	0.5; 0	31.4
2019 municipal election	26 May 2019	—N/a	61.0	47.4; 14	14.1; 4	9.9; 3	7.7; 2	7.3; 2	4.7; 0	3.5; 0	2.6; 0	2.1; 0	–	33.3

=== Girona ===
Color key:

Poll conducted after legal ban on opinion polls

Polling firm/Commissioner	Fieldwork date	Sample size	Turnout	JxCat Junts	CUP	PSC	ERC	CS	ECP	PP	Vox	Valents	Centrem	Lead
2023 municipal election	28 May 2023	—N/a	50.8	20.3; 6	23.3; 8	25.2; 8	9.2; 3	0.6; 0	2.6; 0	5.2; 1	5.1; 1	0.8; 0	4.6; 0	1.9
GAD3/RTVE–FORTA	28 May 2023	500	?	26.0; 9	13.0; 4	25.0; 8	13.0; 4	2.0; 0	4.0; 0	8.0; 2	4.0; 0	–	–	1.0
EM-Analytics/GMG	20 May–14 Aug 2022	764	?	26.0; 9	20.5; 7	20.1; 6	16.4; 5	3.6; 0	3.2; 0	4.1; 0	1.8; 0	1.4; 0	0.9; 0	5.5
2019 municipal election	26 May 2019	—N/a	65.1	31.0; 9	19.2; 6	18.7; 6	14.5; 4	6.7; 2	3.4; 0	3.3; 0	1.4; 0	–	–	11.8

=== L'Hospitalet de Llobregat ===
Polling firm/Commissioner	Fieldwork date	Sample size	Turnout	PSC	ERC	CS	ECP	PP	JxCat Junts	Vox	CUP	Valents	Centrem	Lead
2023 municipal election	28 May 2023	—N/a	47.5	38.4; 13	12.8; 4	2.4; 0	9.8; 3	12.0; 4	3.7; 0	10.3; 3	2.3; 0	1.5; 0	–	25.6
Taforasía/El Llobregat	3–10 Mar 2023	?	63	? 15	? 5	? 1	? 3	? 1	? 1	? 1	–	–	–	?
EM-Analytics/GMG	22 Aug 2022	?	?	39.6; 14	18.7; 6	6.3; 2	11.1; 3	8.0; 2	3.5; 0	4.1; 0	2.3; 0	3.9; 0	1.0; 0	20.9
EM-Analytics/GMG	2–19 May 2022	801	?	41.0; 14	16.9; 5	11.7; 3	12.5; 4	5.1; 1	3.5; 0	3.7; 0	2.3; 0	1.0; 0	1.0; 0	24.1
2019 municipal election	26 May 2019	—N/a	57.5	43.3; 14	16.2; 5	11.8; 4	11.2; 3	5.2; 1	3.5; 0	3.1; 0	2.0; 0	–	–	27.1

=== Lleida ===
Color key:

Poll conducted after legal ban on opinion polls

Polling firm/Commissioner	Fieldwork date	Sample size	Turnout	ERC	PSC	JxCat Junts	CS	ECP	PP	CUP	Vox	Valents	Centrem	Lead
2023 municipal election	28 May 2023	—N/a	51.5	15.2; 5	27.4; 9	14.5; 5	1.3; 0	5.0; 1	15.5; 5	4.6; 0	7.6; 2	1.1; 0	4.8; 0	11.9
GAD3/RTVE–FORTA	28 May 2023	500	?	19.0; 6	26.0; 8	15.0; 5	2.0; 0	5.0; 1	12.0; 4	6.0; 1	8.0; 2	–	–	7.0
Infortécnica/UA1	Feb–Mar 2023	338	?	? 6/7	? 7/8	? 6/7	? 0	? 0/2	? 3	? 0/2	? 1/2	–	–	?
EM-Analytics/GMG	15 May–12 Jul 2022	823	?	27.5; 8	25.1; 8	17.5; 5	1.7; 0	6.8; 2	8.3; 2	5.1; 1	5.1; 1	2.1; 0	0.5; 0	2.4
EM-Analytics/Electomanía	13 May–15 Oct 2021	361	?	26.7; 9	26.5; 8	18.5; 6	2.8; 0	6.5; 2	7.9; 2	4.9; 0	4.1; 0	–	–	0.2
2019 municipal election	26 May 2019	—N/a	60.7	23.8; 7	23.6; 7	19.1; 6	9.8; 3	8.7; 2	6.1; 2	4.3; 0	1.6; 0	–	–	0.2

=== Manresa ===
Polling firm/Commissioner	Fieldwork date	Sample size	Turnout	ERC	JxCat Junts	PSC	CUP	CS	ECP	PP	Vox	Valents	Centrem	FNC	Lead
2023 municipal election	28 May 2023	—N/a	48.5	23.7; 7	20.0; 6	14.3; 4	9.6; 3	0.6; 0	3.7; 0	4.8; 0	6.2; 1	–	8.7; 2	6.5; 2	3.7
EM-Analytics/GMG	1 Jan–13 Mar 2023	431	?	24.8; 7	27.9; 9	17.3; 5	11.1; 3	3.5; 0	3.9; 0	5.1; 1	1.4; 0	0.3; 0	–	–	3.1
2019 municipal election	26 May 2019	—N/a	61.6	28.1; 8	28.1; 8	14.6; 4	10.1; 3	7.0; 2	3.0; 0	2.6; 0	1.3; 0	–	–	–	0.0

=== Mataró ===
Polling firm/Commissioner	Fieldwork date	Sample size	Turnout	PSC	ERC	ECP	JxCat Junts	CS	CUP	Vox	PP	Valents	Lead
2023 municipal election	28 May 2023	—N/a	51.5	33.2; 11	14.8; 4	7.4; 2	9.3; 3	2.5; 0	5.4; 1	12.6; 4	8.6; 2	1.4; 0	18.4
EM-Analytics/GMG	15 Nov–4 Feb 2023	601	?	36.1; 12	27.7; 9	5.9; 1	6.8; 2	1.7; 0	5.8; 1	6.0; 1	5.2; 1	2.5; 0	8.4
2019 municipal election	26 May 2019	—N/a	63.6	38.7; 13	26.2; 8	6.7; 2	6.5; 2	6.1; 2	4.7; 0	4.1; 0	3.8; 0	–	12.5

=== Sabadell ===
Polling firm/Commissioner	Fieldwork date	Sample size	Turnout	PSC	ERC	CUP	CS	JxCat Junts	Podemos	ECP	PP	Vox	Valents	Lead
2023 municipal election	28 May 2023	—N/a	50.3	46.1; 14	11.1; 3	10.3; 3	1.1; 0	8.1; 2	(Note: Within ECP.)	7.3; 2	5.9; 1	6.5; 2	0.4; 0	35.0
Opinòmetre/ERC	27 Apr–5 May 2023	600	?	33.0; 10	27.1; 9	10.2; 3	2.0; 0	8.6; 2	–	8.4; 2	5.8; 1	3.0; 0	–	5.9
Opinòmetre/ERC	30 Mar–12 Apr 2023	600	?	32.7; 10	24.1; 8	10.4; 3	2.8; 0	8.0; 2	–	7.8; 2	7.3; 2	–	–	8.6
EM-Analytics/GMG	18 Jan 2023	?	?	31.5; 10	22.1; 7	10.7; 3	2.2; 0	10.3; 3	–	5.8; 2	5.9; 2	3.3; 0	1.3; 0	9.4
2019 municipal election	26 May 2019	—N/a	62.5	29.9; 10	20.0; 7	11.1; 3	10.2; 3	9.3; 3	5.2; 1	4.0; 0	2.9; 0	1.9; 0	–	9.9

=== Salou ===
Polling firm/Commissioner	Fieldwork date	Sample size	Turnout	SxS	PSC	ERC	CS	PP	Vox	Podemos	USAP	JxCat Junts	Centrem	Lead
2023 municipal election	28 May 2023	—N/a	47.7	29.5; 8	(Note: Within SxS.)	16.2; 4	4.6; 0	9.9; 3	11.7; 3	–	5.2; 1	4.2; 0	9.1; 2	13.3
GESOP/PSC	12–23 May 2022	400	?	27.0– 28.0; 7/8	20.0– 21.0; 5/6	12.0– 13.0; 3	7.5– 8.5; 2	6.5– 7.5; 1	8.5– 9.5; 2	4.5– 5.5; 0/1	–		–	7.0
2019 municipal election	26 May 2019	—N/a	55.1	26.0; 7	17.2; 5	16.2; 4	14.5; 4	5.4; 1	4.3; 0	4.2; 0	3.6; 0		–	8.8

=== Sant Adrià de Besòs ===
Polling firm/Commissioner	Fieldwork date	Sample size	Turnout	PSC	ERC	CS	SEC	MAS	MES	PP	JxCat Junts	Vox	Valents	Centrem	Lead
2023 municipal election	28 May 2023	—N/a	44.9	43.3; 11	14.7; 3	2.0; 0	7.9; 2	–	–	13.3; 3	3.1; 0	10.2; 2	0.6; 0	–	28.6
EM-Analytics/GMG	1 Sep–22 Oct 2022	842	?	29.5; 8	21.7; 5	3.7; 0	8.4; 2	6.9; 1	7.7; 2	10.3; 2	5.6; 1	4.2; 0	1.7; 0	0.3; 0	7.8
2019 municipal election	26 May 2019	—N/a	52.0	31.4; 8	18.7; 5	16.0; 4	9.4; 2	6.8; 1	5.7; 1	4.5; 0	3.9; 0	2.6; 0	–	–	12.7

=== Sant Cugat del Vallès ===
Polling firm/Commissioner	Fieldwork date	Sample size	Turnout	JxCat Junts	ERC	PSC	CS	CUP	PP	ECP	Podemos	Vox	Valents	Lead
2023 municipal election	28 May 2023	—N/a	58.5	28.2; 9	12.4; 4	11.2; 3	2.8; 0	8.7; 2	10.6; 3	5.9; 2		6.2; 2	2.4; 0	15.8
EM-Analytics/GMG	12 Jul–22 Nov 2022	504	?	26.7; 9	21.9; 7	14.1; 4	2.2; 0	12.6; 4	5.1; 1	4.4; 0	3.6; 0	2.7; 0	2.9; 0	4.8
2019 municipal election	26 May 2019	—N/a	70.6	27.5; 9	19.5; 6	12.1; 4	11.8; 3	11.0; 3	4.4; 0	3.9; 0	2.7; 0	2.0; 0	–	8.0

=== Santa Coloma de Gramenet ===
Polling firm/Commissioner	Fieldwork date	Sample size	Turnout	PSC	CS	ECP	ERC	PP	JxCat Junts	Vox	Valents	Centrem	Lead
2023 municipal election	28 May 2023	—N/a	51.5	51.2; 17	7.6; 2	4.9; 0	15.0; 4	6.8; 2	1.3; 0	6.6; 2	0.2; 0	–	36.2
ERC	12 May 2023	400	?	? 13/15	? 2/3	? 2/3	? 6/8	? 0/1	–	? 0/1	–	–	?
EM-Analytics/GMG	22 Oct–5 Jan 2023	1,144	?	47.5; 16	3.9; 0	10.6; 3	15.4; 5	11.0; 3	4.9; 0	4.3; 0	1.6; 0	–	32.1
EM-Analytics/GMG	1 Sep–22 Oct 2022	793	?	49.6; 17	4.2; 0	11.5; 3	14.1; 4	10.5; 3	4.7; 0	4.2; 0	0.9; 0	0.1; 0	35.5
2019 municipal election	26 May 2019	—N/a	57.9	50.9; 17	14.1; 4	10.8; 3	9.9; 3	4.3; 0	2.1; 0	1.9; 0	–	–	36.8

=== Tarragona ===
Color key:

Poll conducted after legal ban on opinion polls

Polling firm/Commissioner	Fieldwork date	Sample size	Turnout	PSC	ERC	CS	JxCat Junts	ECP	CUP	PP	Vox	Valents	Centrem	Lead
2023 municipal election	28 May 2023	—N/a	52.1	27.6; 9	18.8; 6	1.7; 0	8.6; 3	6.0; 2	5.0; 0	13.9; 4	10.6; 3	2.3; 0	–	8.8
GAD3/RTVE–FORTA	28 May 2023	500	?	30.0; 8	19.0; 7	–	9.0; 2/3	5.0; 0/1	–	15.0; 5	11.0; 3	–	–	11.0
Infortécnica/Diari Més	22 May 2023	?	?	35.4; 9/10	32.0; 8/9	? 0/1	8.4; 2/3	? 1/2	? 1/2	10.0; 2/3	? 0/1	? 0/1	? 0/1	3.4
GESOP/Diari Més	26 Dec 2022	?	?	27.5– 28.5; 9/10	20.0– 21.0; 6	–	10.5– 11.5; 3	7.0– 7.5; 1/2	6.0– 7.0; 1/2	9.0– 9.5; 2/3	5.5– 6.5; 1/2	–	–	7.5
EM-Analytics/GMG	2 May–15 Jun 2022	758	?	24.8; 8	22.1; 7	7.3; 2	10.6; 3	8.9; 2	8.8; 2	6.5; 2	5.6; 1	3.4; 0	1.1; 0	2.7
2019 municipal election	26 May 2019	—N/a	62.8	23.4; 7	22.6; 7	14.7; 4	11.1; 3	8.0; 2	6.4; 2	6.3; 2	3.0; 0	–	–	0.8

=== Terrassa ===
Polling firm/Commissioner	Fieldwork date	Sample size	Turnout	TxT	PSC	ERC	CS	JxCat Junts	ECP	CUP	PP	Vox	Valents	Centrem	Lead
2023 municipal election	28 May 2023	—N/a	50.8	33.5; 11	20.9; 7	7.6; 2	1.6; 0	7.2; 2	4.6; 0	3.4; 0	6.6; 2	10.5; 3	0.3; 0	–	12.6
GESOP/Món Terrassa	4–8 May 2023	800	?	31.4; 10/11	22.3; 7	9.9; 3	2.0; 0	8.3; 2/3	6.6; 2	4.0; 0	4.5; 0/1	7.5; 2	–	–	9.1
EM-Analytics/GMG	8 Dec–4 Apr 2023	1,629	?	26.2; 9	23.8; 8	17.9; 6	1.2; 0	7.7; 2	4.8; 0	4.1; 0	7.1; 2	3.9; 0	1.8; 0	–	2.4
EM-Analytics/GMG	13 Jul–7 Dec 2022	1,147	?	26.8; 9	23.2; 8	18.1; 6	1.8; 0	7.5; 2	4.5; 0	3.9; 0	7.3; 2	3.6; 0	1.9; 0	–	3.6
EM-Analytics/GMG	15 May–12 Jul 2022	752	?	27.1; 9	22.7; 8	17.3; 6	2.3; 0	7.3; 2	4.7; 0	3.8; 0	7.5; 2	3.3; 0	1.6; 0	0.8; 0	4.4
2019 municipal election	26 May 2019	—N/a	61.3	29.3; 10	20.5; 7	14.9; 5	8.1; 3	7.6; 2	4.8; 0	3.6; 0	3.1; 0	2.3; 0	–	–	8.8

=== Vilafranca del Penedès ===
Polling firm/Commissioner	Fieldwork date	Sample size	Turnout	JxCat Junts	ERC	PSC	CUP	ECP	CS	PP	Vox	Valents	Lead
2023 municipal election	28 May 2023	—N/a	54.9	20.9; 5	20.9; 5	30.1; 8	11.1; 2	5.6; 1	0.7; 0	4.1; 0	4.3; 0	0.3; 0	9.2
Opinòmetre/ERC	12 May 2023	400	?	22.1; 5	26.1; 6/7	25.2; 6	9.5; 2	7.1; 1	–	5.1; 0/1	–	–	0.9
GESOP/Eix Diari	4 May 2023	?	?	23.0– 24.0; 5/6	23.0– 24.0; 6	24.5– 25.5; 6/7	8.5– 9.5; 2	6.0– 7.0; 1	–	–	–	–	1.5
Celeste-Tel/JxCat	9–22 Mar 2023	500	65.9	32.0; 8	19.6; 4	21.5; 5	11.1; 2	6.9; 1	2.4; 0	6.1; 1	0.3; 0	–	10.5
EM-Analytics/GMG	1 Jan–13 Mar 2023	418	?	29.0; 7	19.3; 4	18.1; 4	13.0; 3	7.8; 2	2.7; 0	5.4; 1	3.0; 0	0.4; 0	9.7
2019 municipal election	26 May 2019	—N/a	66.2	29.2; 7	21.9; 5	19.8; 5	11.8; 2	7.6; 1	5.7; 1	3.3; 0	–	–	7.3
