= 2023 Spanish local elections in Catalonia =

This article presents the results breakdown of the local elections held in Catalonia on 28 May 2023. The following tables show detailed results in the autonomous community's most populous municipalities, sorted alphabetically.

== City control ==
The following table lists party control in the most populous municipalities, including provincial capitals (shown in bold). Gains for a party are displayed with the cell's background shaded in that party's colour.

Municipality	Population	Previous control	New control
Badalona	223,506	Socialists' Party of Catalonia (PSC–PSOE)	People's Party (PP)
**Barcelona**	1,636,193	Barcelona in Common (BComú)	Socialists' Party of Catalonia (PSC–PSOE)
Cornellà de Llobregat	89,039	Socialists' Party of Catalonia (PSC–PSOE)	Socialists' Party of Catalonia (PSC–PSOE)
**Girona**	102,666	Together for Catalonia (Junts)	Let's Win Girona (GGI)
L'Hospitalet de Llobregat	265,444	Socialists' Party of Catalonia (PSC–PSOE)	Socialists' Party of Catalonia (PSC–PSOE)
**Lleida**	140,797	Republican Left of Catalonia (ERC)	Socialists' Party of Catalonia (PSC–PSOE)
Manresa	77,459	Republican Left of Catalonia (ERC)	Republican Left of Catalonia (ERC)
Mataró	128,956	Socialists' Party of Catalonia (PSC–PSOE)	Socialists' Party of Catalonia (PSC–PSOE)
Reus	106,741	Together for Catalonia (Junts)	Socialists' Party of Catalonia (PSC–PSOE)
Rubí	79,007	Socialists' Party of Catalonia (PSC–PSOE)	Socialists' Party of Catalonia (PSC–PSOE)
Sabadell	215,760	Socialists' Party of Catalonia (PSC–PSOE)	Socialists' Party of Catalonia (PSC–PSOE)
Sant Boi de Llobregat	83,371	Socialists' Party of Catalonia (PSC–PSOE)	Socialists' Party of Catalonia (PSC–PSOE)
Sant Cugat del Vallès	95,725	Republican Left of Catalonia (ERC)	Together for Catalonia (Junts)
Santa Coloma de Gramenet	117,981	Socialists' Party of Catalonia (PSC–PSOE)	Socialists' Party of Catalonia (PSC–PSOE)
**Tarragona**	134,883	Republican Left of Catalonia (ERC)	Socialists' Party of Catalonia (PSC–PSOE)
Terrassa	224,114	All for Terrassa (TxT)	All for Terrassa (TxT)

== Municipalities ==
=== Badalona ===
Population: 223,506

← Summary of the 28 May 2023 City Council of Badalona election results →
Parties and alliances	Popular vote			Seats	
Parties and alliances	Votes	%	±pp	Total	+/−
People's Party (PP)	50,163	55.69	+18.10	18	+7
Socialists' Party of Catalonia–United–Progress Candidacy (PSC–CP)	13,164	14.62	−5.32	4	−2
Republican Left of Catalonia–Municipal Agreement (ERC–AM)^{1}	6,848	7.60	n/a	2	−1
Badalona in Common We Can–Confluence (BComúP–C)	6,301	7.00	−1.52	2	±0
Let's Win Badalona in Common–Municipalists of Catalonia (GBeC–MCat)^{1}	5,499	6.11	n/a	1	−3
Together–Municipal Commitment (CM)^{2}	4,291	4.76	−0.39	0	−1
Vox (Vox)	1,210	1.34	+0.95	0	±0
Brave (Valents)	579	0.64	New	0	±0
Sum Badalona–Now Local Agreement (BDN+–Ara PL)	427	0.47	New	0	±0
Citizens–Party of the Citizenry (CS)	266	0.30	−1.47	0	±0
National Front of Catalonia (FNC)	181	0.20	New	0	±0
Blank ballots	1,140	1.27	+0.74		
Total	90,069			27	±0
Valid votes	90,069	99.15	−0.58		
Invalid votes	772	0.85	+0.58		
Votes cast / turnout	90,841	58.07	−5.77		
Abstentions	65,582	41.93	+5.77		
Registered voters	156,423				
Sources
Footnotes: ^{1} Within the Let's Win Badalona in Common alliance in the 2019 election.; ^{2} Together–Municipal Commitment results are compared to Together for Catalonia–Badalona totals in the 2019 election.

=== Barcelona ===
Population: 1,636,193

=== Cornellà de Llobregat ===
Population: 89,039

← Summary of the 28 May 2023 City Council of Cornellà de Llobregat election results →
Parties and alliances	Popular vote			Seats	
Parties and alliances	Votes	%	±pp	Total	+/−
Socialists' Party of Catalonia–Progress Candidacy (PSC–CP)	14,037	43.37	−4.08	13	−1
Republican Left of Catalonia+EUiA–Municipal Agreement (ERC+EUiA–AM)	4,175	12.90	−1.18	4	±0
Cornellà in Common We Can–Confluence (CECP–C)	3,253	10.05	+2.78	3	+1
People's Party (PP)	3,109	9.60	+4.85	3	+3
Vox (Vox)	2,714	8.38	+6.28	2	+2
We Can (Podemos)	1,121	3.46	−4.26	0	−2
CUP–Cornellà Left Alternative–Municipalist Alternative (CUP–AMunt)	1,055	3.26	−0.25	0	±0
Together for Catalonia–Municipal Commitment (CM)^{1}	1,017	3.14	+0.59	0	±0
Citizens–Party of the Citizenry (CS)	783	2.42	−7.53	0	−3
Brave (Valents)	496	1.53	New	0	±0
Now Cornellà–Now Local Agreement (Ara PL)	155	0.48	New	0	±0
Blank ballots	454	1.40	+0.92		
Total	32,369			25	±0
Valid votes	32,369	98.86	−0.88		
Invalid votes	373	1.14	+0.88		
Votes cast / turnout	32,742	51.74	−9.29		
Abstentions	30,544	48.26	+9.29		
Registered voters	63,286				
Sources
Footnotes: ^{1} Together for Catalonia–Municipal Commitment results are compared to Together for L'Hospitalet totals in the 2019 election.

=== Girona ===
Population: 102,666

← Summary of the 28 May 2023 City Council of Girona election results →
Parties and alliances	Popular vote			Seats	
Parties and alliances	Votes	%	±pp	Total	+/−
Socialists' Party of Catalonia–Progress Candidacy (PSC–CP)	8,644	25.22	+6.50	8	+2
Let's Win Girona–Municipalist Alternative (GGI–AMunt)	7,989	23.31	+4.16	8	+2
Together for Girona–Municipal Commitment (CM)^{1}	6,950	20.28	−10.68	6	−3
Republican Left of Catalonia–Municipal Agreement (ERC–AM)	3,151	9.19	−5.30	3	−1
People's Party (PP)	1,791	5.23	+1.94	1	+1
Vox (Vox)	1,740	5.08	+3.71	1	+1
Now Girona–Now Local Agreement (Ara PL)	1,579	4.61	New	0	±0
Girona in Common We Can–Confluence (GeCP–C)	892	2.60	−0.82	0	±0
Brave (Valents)	262	0.76	New	0	±0
Blank Seats to Leave Empty Seats (EB)	228	0.67	New	0	±0
Citizens–Party of the Citizenry (CS)	198	0.58	−6.08	0	−2
National Front of Catalonia (FNC)	158	0.46	New	0	±0
Girona for Girona (GIxGI)	133	0.39	New	0	±0
Blank ballots	554	1.62	+1.06		
Total	34,269			27	±0
Valid votes	34,269	98.41	−1.24		
Invalid votes	553	1.59	+1.24		
Votes cast / turnout	34,822	50.82	−14.28		
Abstentions	33,693	49.18	+14.28		
Registered voters	68,515				
Sources
Footnotes: ^{1} Together for Girona–Municipal Commitment results are compared to Together for Catalonia–Girona totals in the 2019 election.

=== L'Hospitalet de Llobregat ===
Population: 265,444

← Summary of the 28 May 2023 City Council of L'Hospitalet de Llobregat election results →
Parties and alliances	Popular vote			Seats	
Parties and alliances	Votes	%	±pp	Total	+/−
Socialists' Party of Catalonia–Progress Candidacy (PSC–CP)	31,777	38.43	−4.92	13	−1
Republican Left of Catalonia+EUiA–Municipal Agreement (ERC+EUiA–AM)	10,560	12.77	−3.44	4	−1
People's Party (PP)	9,945	12.03	+6.87	4	+3
Vox (Vox)	8,494	10.27	+7.15	3	+3
L'Hospitalet in Common We Can–Confluence (LHECP–C)	8,126	9.83	−1.36	3	±0
Together for L'Hospitalet–Municipal Commitment (CM)^{1}	3,075	3.72	+0.26	0	±0
Citizens–Party of the Citizenry (CS)	1,986	2.40	−9.40	0	−4
Popular Unity Candidacy–Municipalist Alternative (CUP–AMunt)	1,875	2.27	+0.21	0	±0
Neighbours of L'Hospitalet (VLH)	1,761	2.13	New	0	±0
Brave (Valents)	1,252	1.51	New	0	±0
L'Hospitalet Left Alternative (AELH)	833	1.01	+0.10	0	±0
Decide L'Hospitalet (Decideix LH)	485	0.59	New	0	±0
European Union of Pensioners (UEP)	362	0.44	New	0	±0
Zero Cuts (Recortes Cero)	352	0.43	New	0	±0
Boost L'Hospitalet–Now Local Agreement (Ara PL)	252	0.30	New	0	±0
We Propose for the Minorities (Proponemos XM)	140	0.17	−0.02	0	±0
Labour Party–Effective Democracy–Valencian Republic (PTDEFRV)	116	0.14	New	0	±0
Blank ballots	1,290	1.56	+1.12		
Total	82,681			27	±0
Valid votes	82,681	98.79	−0.82		
Invalid votes	1,011	1.21	+0.82		
Votes cast / turnout	83,692	47.46	−10.02		
Abstentions	92,632	52.54	+10.02		
Registered voters	176,324				
Sources
Footnotes: ^{1} Together for L'Hospitalet–Municipal Commitment results are compared to Together for L'Hospitalet totals in the 2019 election.

=== Lleida ===
Population: 140,797

← Summary of the 28 May 2023 City Council of Lleida election results →
Parties and alliances	Popular vote			Seats	
Parties and alliances	Votes	%	±pp	Total	+/−
Socialists' Party of Catalonia–Progress Candidacy (PSC–CP)	12,979	27.44	+3.81	9	+2
People's Party (PP)	7,348	15.54	+9.48	5	+3
Republican Left of Catalonia–Municipal Agreement (ERC–AM)	7,199	15.22	−8.55	5	−2
Together for Catalonia Lleida–Municipal Commitment (CM)^{1}	6,862	14.51	−4.58	5	−1
Vox (Vox)	3,575	7.56	+5.97	2	+2
Common of Lleida–Confluence (Comudelleida–C)	2,373	5.02	−3.66	1	−1
Let's Active Lleida–Now Local Agreement (Ara PL)	2,258	4.77	New	0	±0
Popular Unity Candidacy–Municipalist Alternative (CUP–AMunt)	2,170	4.59	+0.27	0	±0
Citizens–Party of the Citizenry (CS)	638	1.35	−8.44	0	−3
Brave (Valents)	504	1.07	New	0	±0
Blank Seats to Leave Empty Seats (EB)	345	0.73	New	0	±0
Blank ballots	1,040	2.20	+1.50		
Total	47,291			27	±0
Valid votes	47,291	98.25	−1.36		
Invalid votes	842	1.75	+1.36		
Votes cast / turnout	48,133	51.51	−9.15		
Abstentions	45,311	48.49	+9.15		
Registered voters	93,444				
Sources
Footnotes: ^{1} Together for Catalonia Lleida–Municipal Commitment results are compared to Together for Catalonia–Lleida totals in the 2019 election.

=== Manresa ===
Population: 77,452

← Summary of the 28 May 2023 City Council of Manresa election results →
Parties and alliances	Popular vote			Seats	
Parties and alliances	Votes	%	±pp	Total	+/−
Republican Left of Catalonia–Municipal Agreement (ERC–AM)	5,928	23.74	−4.40	7	−1
Together for Manresa–Municipal Commitment (CM)^{1}	5,001	20.03	−8.08	6	−2
Socialists' Party of Catalonia–Progress Candidacy (PSC–CP)	3,582	14.35	−0.29	4	±0
Let's Make Manresa–Municipalist Alternative (Fem–AMunt)	2,385	9.55	−0.54	3	±0
Let's Promote Manresa–Now Local Agreement (Ara PL)	2,183	8.74	New	2	+2
National Front of Catalonia (FNC)	1,618	6.48	New	2	+2
Vox (Vox)	1,537	6.16	+4.84	1	+1
People's Party (PP)	1,192	4.77	+2.18	0	±0
In Common We Can Manresa–Confluence (MECP–C)^{2}	918	3.68	−1.17	0	±0
Citizens–Party of the Citizenry (CS)	153	0.61	−6.43	0	−2
Blank ballots	470	1.85	+1.07		
Total	24,967			25	±0
Valid votes	24,967	98.50	−1.17		
Invalid votes	381	1.50	+1.17		
Votes cast / turnout	25,348	48.49	−13.12		
Abstentions	26,924	51.51	+13.12		
Registered voters	52,272				
Sources
Footnotes: ^{1} Together for Manresa–Municipal Commitment results are compared to Together for Manresa totals in the 2019 election.; ^{2} In Common We Can Manresa–Confluence results are compared to the combined totals of Manresa in Common–In Common We Win and We Can in the 2019 election.

=== Mataró ===
Population: 128,956

← Summary of the 28 May 2023 City Council of Mataró election results →
Parties and alliances	Popular vote			Seats	
Parties and alliances	Votes	%	±pp	Total	+/−
Socialists' Party of Catalonia–Progress Candidacy (PSC–CP)	15,031	33.25	−5.49	11	−2
Republican Left of Catalonia–Municipal Agreement (ERC–AM)	6,712	14.85	−11.34	4	−4
Vox (Vox)	5,665	12.53	+8.44	4	+4
Together for Mataró–Municipal Commitment (CM)^{1}	4,178	9.24	+2.71	3	+1
People's Party (PP)	3,890	8.60	+4.81	2	+2
In Common We Can Mataró–Confluence (ECPM–C)	3,334	7.37	+0.63	2	±0
Popular Unity Candidacy–Municipalist Alternative (CUP–AMunt)	2,441	5.40	+0.68	1	+1
Citizens–Party of the Citizenry (CS)	1,115	2.47	−3.67	0	−2
Mataró Moves Us–Now Local Agreement (MEM–Ara PL)	1,064	2.35	New	0	±0
Brave (Valents)	660	1.46	New	0	±0
National Front of Catalonia (FNC)	246	0.54	New	0	±0
Blank ballots	873	1.93	+1.49		
Total	45,209			27	±0
Valid votes	45,209	98.57	−1.20		
Invalid votes	655	1.43	+1.20		
Votes cast / turnout	45,864	51.60	−11.96		
Abstentions	43,016	48.40	+11.96		
Registered voters	88,880				
Sources
Footnotes: ^{1} Together for Mataró–Municipal Commitment results are compared to Together for Mataró totals in the 2019 election.

=== Reus ===
Population: 106,741

← Summary of the 28 May 2023 City Council of Reus election results →
Parties and alliances	Popular vote			Seats	
Parties and alliances	Votes	%	±pp	Total	+/−
Socialists' Party of Catalonia–Progress Candidacy (PSC–CP)	8,648	23.98	+7.08	8	+2
Republican Left of Catalonia–Municipal Agreement (ERC–AM)	5,637	15.63	−1.52	5	−1
Together for Reus–Municipal Commitment (CM)^{1}	5,320	14.75	−7.49	5	−2
Vox (Vox)	3,778	10.48	+7.76	3	+3
Reus Now–Now Local Agreement (Ara PL)	2,986	8.28	+1.84	2	±0
People's Party (PP)	2,712	7.52	+2.80	2	+2
Popular Unity Candidacy–Municipalist Alternative (CUP–AMunt)	2,136	5.92	−2.75	2	−1
Reus in Movement–We Are Left Movement of Catalonia (REM–SomMESCat)	1,427	3.96	New	0	±0
Reus in Common We Can–Confluence (RECP–C)	1,089	3.02	−1.62	0	±0
Reus Among Neighbours (EVR)	713	1.98	+0.15	0	±0
Brave (Valents)	612	1.70	New	0	±0
Citizens–Party of the Citizenry (CS)	406	1.13	−9.54	0	−3
Blank ballots	592	1.64	+0.95		
Total	36,056			27	±0
Valid votes	36,056	98.52	−1.08		
Invalid votes	542	1.48	+1.08		
Votes cast / turnout	36,598	50.07	−10.63		
Abstentions	36,493	49.93	+10.63		
Registered voters	73,091				
Sources
Footnotes: ^{1} Together for Reus–Municipal Commitment results are compared to Together for Reus totals in the 2019 election.

=== Rubí ===
Population: 79,007

← Summary of the 28 May 2023 City Council of Rubí election results →
Parties and alliances	Popular vote			Seats	
Parties and alliances	Votes	%	±pp	Total	+/−
Socialists' Party of Catalonia–Progress Candidacy (PSC–CP)	8,424	31.34	−1.68	9	−1
Republican Left of Catalonia–Municipal Agreement (ERC–AM)	4,566	16.99	−5.77	5	−2
Vox (Vox)	2,939	10.93	+8.68	3	+3
People's Party (PP)	2,339	8.70	+5.01	2	+2
Neighbours for Rubí (VR)	2,146	7.98	+1.51	2	+1
Popular Unity Alternative–Municipalist Alternative (AUP–AMunt)	1,983	7.38	+2.28	2	+1
Sant Boi in Common We Can–Confluence (ECPR–C)	1,964	7.31	−3.35	2	−1
Together for Catalonia–Rubí–Municipal Commitment (CM)^{1}	1,296	4.82	+0.48	0	±0
Citizens–Party of the Citizenry (CS)	649	2.41	−7.98	0	−3
Brave (Valents)	152	0.57	New	0	±0
Let's Go Rubí–Now Local Agreement (Ara PL)	95	0.35	New	0	±0
Blank ballots	325	1.20	+0.76		
Total	26,878			25	±0
Valid votes	26,878	98.97	−0.75		
Invalid votes	281	1.03	+0.75		
Votes cast / turnout	27,159	47.97	−9.74		
Abstentions	29,463	52.03	+9.74		
Registered voters	56,622				
Sources
Footnotes: ^{1} Together for Catalonia–Rubí–Municipal Commitment results are compared to Together for Rubí totals in the 2019 election.

=== Sabadell ===
Population: 215,760

← Summary of the 28 May 2023 City Council of Sabadell election results →
Parties and alliances	Popular vote			Seats	
Parties and alliances	Votes	%	±pp	Total	+/−
Socialists' Party of Catalonia–Progress Candidacy (PSC–CP)	35,799	46.07	+16.21	14	+4
Republican Left of Catalonia+EUiA–Municipal Agreement (ERC+EUiA–AM)	8,592	11.06	−8.93	3	−4
Call for Sabadell–Municipalist Alternative (CpSBD–AMunt)	8,018	10.32	−0.81	3	±0
Together for Sabadell–Municipal Commitment (CM)^{1}	6,319	8.13	−1.20	2	−1
Sabadell in Common We Can–Confluence (SECP–C)^{2}	5,636	7.25	−2.02	2	+1
Vox (Vox)	5,087	6.55	+4.69	2	+2
People's Party (PP)	4,557	5.86	+2.95	1	+1
We Feel Sabadell (SSBD)	939	1.21	New	0	±0
Citizens–Party of the Citizenry (CS)	884	1.14	−9.08	0	−3
Catalan European Democratic Party–Now Local Agreement (PDeCAT–Ara PL)	400	0.51	New	0	±0
Brave (Valents)	289	0.37	New	0	±0
Blank ballots	1,184	1.52	+1.01		
Total	77,704			27	±0
Valid votes	77,704	98.61	−1.09		
Invalid votes	1,092	1.39	+1.09		
Votes cast / turnout	78,796	50.33	−12.22		
Abstentions	77,750	49.67	+12.22		
Registered voters	156,546				
Sources
Footnotes: ^{1} Together for Sabadell–Municipal Commitment results are compared to Together for Sabadell totals in the 2019 election.; ^{2} Sabadell in Common We Can–Confluence results are compared to the combined totals of We Can and Sabadell in Common–In Common We Win in the 2019 election.

=== Sant Boi de Llobregat ===
Population: 83,371

← Summary of the 28 May 2023 City Council of Sant Boi de Llobregat election results →
Parties and alliances	Popular vote			Seats	
Parties and alliances	Votes	%	±pp	Total	+/−
Socialists' Party of Catalonia–Progress Candidacy (PSC–CP)	15,019	48.43	+5.58	16	+3
Republican Left of Catalonia–Municipal Agreement (ERC–AM)	3,653	11.78	−4.91	3	−2
People's Party (PP)	2,485	8.01	+3.64	2	+2
Vox (Vox)	2,332	7.52	+5.73	2	+2
Sant Boi in Common We Can–Confluence (SBECP–C)^{1}	1,945	6.27	−8.50	2	−2
Together for Sant Boi–Together for Catalonia–Municipal Commitment (CM)^{2}	1,303	4.20	−0.47	0	±0
United Left (EU)	1,256	4.05	New	0	±0
Brave (Valents)	773	2.49	New	0	±0
Popular Unity Candidacy–Municipalist Alternative (CUP–AMunt)^{3}	727	2.34	−1.55	0	±0
Citizens–Party of the Citizenry (CS)	521	1.68	−8.80	0	−3
Let's Advance Sant Boi–Now Local Agreement (AvancemSB–Ara PL)	480	1.55	New	0	±0
Blank ballots	516	1.64	+1.15		
Total	31,010			25	±0
Valid votes	31,010	98.72	−0.90		
Invalid votes	401	1.28	+0.90		
Votes cast / turnout	31,411	50.58	−9.45		
Abstentions	30,692	49.42	+9.45		
Registered voters	62,103				
Sources
Footnotes: ^{1} Sant Boi in Common We Can–Confluence results are compared to the combined totals of Sant Boi in Common–In Common We Win and We Can–Unitary Left in the 2019 election.; ^{2} Together for Sant Boi–Together for Catalonia–Municipal Commitment results are compared to Together for Sant Boi totals in the 2019 election.; ^{3} Popular Unity Candidacy–Municipalist Alternative results are compared to Let's Win Sant Boi–Municipalist Alternative totals in the 2019 election.

=== Sant Cugat del Vallès ===
Population: 95,725

← Summary of the 28 May 2023 City Council of Sant Cugat del Vallès election results →
Parties and alliances	Popular vote			Seats	
Parties and alliances	Votes	%	±pp	Total	+/−
Together for Sant Cugat–Municipal Commitment (CM)^{1}	10,875	28.17	+0.64	9	±0
Republican Left of Catalonia–Municipal Agreement (ERC–AM)	4,769	12.35	−7.12	4	−2
Socialists' Party of Catalonia–Progress Candidacy (PSC–CP)	4,313	11.17	−0.98	3	−1
People's Party (PP)	4,092	10.60	+6.21	3	+3
Popular Unity Candidacy–Municipalist Alternative (CUP–AMunt)	3,374	8.74	−2.30	2	−1
Vox (Vox)	2,406	6.23	+4.27	2	+2
Sant Cugat in Common We Can–Confluence (SCECP–C)^{2}	2,274	5.89	−0.65	2	+2
Sant Cugat Independents–Independents of Catalonia (ISC–IDC)	1,377	3.57	New	0	±0
Animalist Party with the Environment (PACMA)	1,078	2.79	New	0	±0
Citizens–Party of the Citizenry (CS)	1,062	2.75	−9.01	0	−3
Brave (Valents)	914	2.37	New	0	±0
PDeCAT–United–Now Local Agreement (PDeCAT–UxSC–Ara PL)^{3}	792	2.05	−0.66	0	±0
Convergents (CNV)	253	0.66	New	0	±0
National Front of Catalonia (FNC)	204	0.53	New	0	±0
Municipal Initiative of Freely and Solidarity United People (IMPULS)	171	0.44	New	0	±0
Blank ballots	646	1.67	+1.00		
Total	38,600			25	±0
Valid votes	38,600	99.03	−0.81		
Invalid votes	379	0.97	+0.81		
Votes cast / turnout	38,979	58.46	−12.13		
Abstentions	27,702	41.54	+12.13		
Registered voters	66,681				
Sources
Footnotes: ^{1} Together for Sant Cugat–Municipal Commitment results are compared to Together for Sant Cugat totals in the 2019 election.; ^{2} Sant Cugat in Common We Can–Confluence results are compared to the combined totals of Sant Cugat in Common–In Common We Win and We Can in the 2019 election.; ^{3} PDeCAT–United–Now Local Agreement results are compared to United for Sant Cugat totals in the 2019 election.

=== Santa Coloma de Gramenet ===
Population: 117,981

← Summary of the 28 May 2023 City Council of Santa Coloma de Gramenet election results →
Parties and alliances	Popular vote			Seats	
Parties and alliances	Votes	%	±pp	Total	+/−
Socialists' Party of Catalonia–Progress Candidacy (PSC–CP)	20,131	51.24	+0.30	17	±0
Republican Left of Catalonia–Municipal Agreement (ERC–AM)	5,876	14.96	+5.04	4	+1
Citizens–Party of the Citizenry (CS)	2,967	7.55	−6.57	2	−2
People's Party (PP)	2,667	6.79	+2.53	2	+2
Vox (Vox)	2,586	6.58	+4.64	2	+2
Santa Coloma in Common We Can–Confluence (SCG–ECP–C)	1,909	4.86	−5.97	0	−3
CUP–People of Gramenet–Municipalist Alternative (CUP–GG–AMunt)^{1}	1,047	2.66	−2.32	0	±0
Animalist Party with the Environment (PACMA)	594	1.51	New	0	±0
Together for Santa Coloma de Gramenet–Municipal Commitment (CM)^{2}	508	1.29	−0.80	0	±0
United Yes We Can–Santa Coloma de Gramenet (USSP–SCG)	318	0.81	New	0	±0
Communist Party of the Catalan People (PCPC)	136	0.35	+0.02	0	±0
Brave (Valents)	92	0.23	New	0	±0
Convergents for Santa Coloma–Now Local Agreement (Ara PL)	62	0.16	New	0	±0
Blank ballots	396	1.01	+0.58		
Total	39,289			27	±0
Valid votes	39,289	99.21	−0.38		
Invalid votes	311	0.79	+0.38		
Votes cast / turnout	39,600	51.49	−6.40		
Abstentions	37,311	48.51	+6.40		
Registered voters	76,911				
Sources
Footnotes: ^{1} CUP–People of Gramenet–Municipalist Alternative results are compared to We Are Gramenet–Municipalist Alternative totals in the 2019 election.; ^{2} Together for Santa Coloma de Gramenet–Municipal Commitment results are compared to Together for Catalonia–Santa Coloma totals in the 2019 election.

=== Tarragona ===
Population: 134,883

← Summary of the 28 May 2023 City Council of Tarragona election results →
Parties and alliances	Popular vote			Seats	
Parties and alliances	Votes	%	±pp	Total	+/−
Socialists' Party of Catalonia–Progress Candidacy (PSC–CP)	13,123	27.56	+4.18	9	+2
Republican Left of Catalonia–Municipal Agreement (ERC–AM)	8,940	18.77	−3.83	6	−1
People's Party (PP)	6,638	13.94	+7.67	4	+2
Vox (Vox)	5,035	10.57	+7.61	3	+3
Together for Catalonia Tarragona–Municipal Commitment (CM)^{1}	4,119	8.65	−2.49	3	±0
Tarragona in Common We Can–Confluence (ECP–TGNECP–C)	2,881	6.05	−1.95	2	±0
Popular Unity Candidacy–Municipalist Alternative (CUP–AMunt)	2,361	4.96	−1.42	0	−2
Yes Tarragona–Now Local Agreement (Ara PL)	1,321	2.77	New	0	±0
Brave (Valents)	1,117	2.35	New	0	±0
Citizens–Party of the Citizenry (CS)	792	1.66	−13.05	0	−4
Blank Seats to Leave Empty Seats (EB)	231	0.49	New	0	±0
Communist Party of the Workers of Catalonia (PCTC)	179	0.38	New	0	±0
Convergents (CNV)	71	0.15	New	0	±0
Blank ballots	809	1.70	+1.22		
Total	47,617			27	±0
Valid votes	47,617	98.67	−0.95		
Invalid votes	643	1.33	+0.95		
Votes cast / turnout	48,260	52.07	−10.73		
Abstentions	44,425	47.93	+10.73		
Registered voters	92,685				
Sources
Footnotes: ^{1} Together for Catalonia Tarragona–Municipal Commitment results are compared to Together for Tarragona totals in the 2019 election.

=== Terrassa ===
Population: 224,114

← Summary of the 28 May 2023 City Council of Terrassa election results →
Parties and alliances	Popular vote			Seats	
Parties and alliances	Votes	%	±pp	Total	+/−
All for Terrassa (TxT)	26,732	33.47	+4.19	11	+1
Socialists' Party of Catalonia–Progress Candidacy (PSC–CP)	16,712	20.92	+0.36	7	±0
Vox (Vox)	8,380	10.49	+8.16	3	+3
Republican Left of Catalonia–Municipal Agreement (ERC–AM)	6,047	7.57	−7.36	2	−3
Together for Terrassa–Municipal Commitment (CM)^{1}	5,723	7.16	−0.40	2	±0
People's Party (PP)	5,242	6.56	+3.46	2	+2
Terrassa in Common We Can–Confluence (TECP–C)^{2}	3,643	4.56	−3.97	0	±0
Popular Unity Candidacy–Municipalist Alternative (CUP–AMunt)	2,696	3.38	−0.21	0	±0
Citizens–Party of the Citizenry (CS)	1,273	1.59	−6.52	0	−3
Animalist Party with the Environment (PACMA)	1,234	1.54	New	0	±0
Family and Life Party (PFyV)	450	0.56	+0.26	0	±0
Brave (Valents)	280	0.35	New	0	±0
Communist Party of the Workers of Catalonia (PCTC)	212	0.27	New	0	±0
Now Terrassa–Now Local Agreement (Ara PL)	124	0.16	New	0	±0
Blank ballots	1,131	1.42	+0.99		
Total	79,879			27	±0
Valid votes	79,879	98.98	−0.79		
Invalid votes	822	1.02	+0.79		
Votes cast / turnout	80,701	50.85	−10.48		
Abstentions	78,002	49.15	+10.48		
Registered voters	158,703				
Sources
Footnotes: ^{1} Together for Terrassa–Municipal Commitment results are compared to Together for Terrassa totals in the 2019 election.; ^{2} Terrassa in Common We Can–Confluence results are compared to the combined totals of Terrassa in Common–In Common We Win and We Can–Green Initiative–Left Unity for Terrassa in the 2019 election.
