= 2015 Spanish local elections in Catalonia =

This article presents the results breakdown of the local elections held in Catalonia on 24 May 2015. The following tables show detailed results in the autonomous community's most populous municipalities, sorted alphabetically.

== City control ==
The following table lists party control in the most populous municipalities, including provincial capitals (shown in bold). Gains for a party are displayed with the cell's background shaded in that party's colour.

Municipality	Population	Previous control	New control
Badalona	217,210	People's Party (PP)	Let's Win Badalona–Badalona in Common (GBC) (PSC–PSOE in 2018)
**Barcelona**	1,602,386	Convergence and Union (CiU)	Barcelona in Common (BComú)
Cornellà de Llobregat	86,234	Socialists' Party of Catalonia (PSC–PSOE)	Socialists' Party of Catalonia (PSC–PSOE)
**Girona**	97,227	Convergence and Union (CiU)	Convergence and Union (CiU)
L'Hospitalet de Llobregat	253,518	Socialists' Party of Catalonia (PSC–PSOE)	Socialists' Party of Catalonia (PSC–PSOE)
**Lleida**	139,176	Socialists' Party of Catalonia (PSC–PSOE)	Socialists' Party of Catalonia (PSC–PSOE)
Manresa	75,297	Convergence and Union (CiU)	Convergence and Union (CiU)
Mataró	124,280	Convergence and Union (CiU)	Socialists' Party of Catalonia (PSC–PSOE)
Reus	104,962	Convergence and Union (CiU)	Convergence and Union (CiU)
Sabadell	207,444	Socialists' Party of Catalonia (PSC–PSOE)	Republican Left of Catalonia (ERC) (CUP in 2017)
Sant Boi de Llobregat	83,107	Socialists' Party of Catalonia (PSC–PSOE)	Socialists' Party of Catalonia (PSC–PSOE)
Sant Cugat del Vallès	87,118	Convergence and Union (CiU)	Convergence and Union (CiU)
Santa Coloma de Gramenet	118,738	Socialists' Party of Catalonia (PSC–PSOE)	Socialists' Party of Catalonia (PSC–PSOE)
**Tarragona**	132,199	Socialists' Party of Catalonia (PSC–PSOE)	Socialists' Party of Catalonia (PSC–PSOE)
Terrassa	215,517	Socialists' Party of Catalonia (PSC–PSOE)	Socialists' Party of Catalonia (PSC–PSOE)

== Municipalities ==
=== Badalona ===
Population: 217,210

← Summary of the 24 May 2015 City Council of Badalona election results →
Parties and alliances	Popular vote			Seats	
Parties and alliances	Votes	%	±pp	Total	+/−
People's Party (PP)	30,567	34.21	+0.73	10	−1
Let's Win Badalona–Badalona in Common–Active People (GBC–PA)^{1}	15,645	17.51	+15.69	5	+5
Socialists' Party of Catalonia–Progress Candidacy (PSC–CP)	12,593	14.09	−12.96	4	−5
ERC–Advance–Left Movement–Municipal Agreement (ERC–A–MES–AM)	9,812	10.98	+7.28	3	+3
Convergence and Union (CiU)	7,097	7.94	−4.61	2	−2
Initiative Greens–EUiA–It is Possible–Agreement (ICV–EUiA–EP–E)	5,971	6.68	−2.22	2	−1
Citizens–Party of the Citizenry (C's)	5,002	5.60	+4.43	1	+1
We Make Badalona, Municipal Party for Badalona (Fem B, PMB)	460	0.51	New	0	±0
Citizens' Democratic Renewal Movement (RED)	403	0.45	New	0	±0
Independent Space Place (LLEI)	328	0.37	+0.05	0	±0
Union, Progress and Democracy (UPyD)	277	0.31	New	0	±0
Blank ballots	1,198	1.34	−2.44		
Total	89,353			27	±0
Valid votes	89,353	99.44	+0.55		
Invalid votes	499	0.56	−0.55		
Votes cast / turnout	89,852	57.53	+5.42		
Abstentions	66,337	42.47	−5.42		
Registered voters	156,189				
Sources
Footnotes: ^{1} Let's Win Badalona–Badalona in Common–Active People results are compared to Popular Unity Candidacy–Active People totals in the 2011 election.

=== Barcelona ===
Population: 1,602,386

=== Cornellà de Llobregat ===
Population: 86,234

← Summary of the 24 May 2015 City Council of Cornellà de Llobregat election results →
Parties and alliances	Popular vote			Seats	
Parties and alliances	Votes	%	±pp	Total	+/−
Socialists' Party of Catalonia–Progress Candidacy (PSC–CP)	13,416	38.56	−3.52	11	−3
Cornellà in Common–Call for Cornellà (CEC–CPC)	6,061	17.42	New	5	+5
Citizens–Party of the Citizenry (C's)	3,926	11.28	+8.67	3	+3
Republican Left of Catalonia–Municipal Agreement (ERC–AM)	3,208	9.22	+4.73	2	+2
Initiative for Catalonia Greens–EUiA–Progress Agreement (ICV–EUiA–EP)	2,831	8.14	−3.74	2	−2
People's Party (PP)	2,717	7.81	−8.14	2	−3
Convergence and Union (CiU)	1,454	4.18	−4.70	0	−2
Platform for Catalonia (PxC)	630	1.81	−3.14	0	±0
Union, Progress and Democracy (UPyD)	176	0.51	New	0	±0
Blank ballots	373	1.07	−3.57		
Total	34,792			25	±0
Valid votes	34,792	99.44	+1.04		
Invalid votes	195	0.56	−1.04		
Votes cast / turnout	34,987	56.44	+5.97		
Abstentions	26,998	43.56	−5.97		
Registered voters	61,985				

=== Girona ===
Population: 97,227

← Summary of the 24 May 2015 City Council of Girona election results →
Parties and alliances	Popular vote			Seats	
Parties and alliances	Votes	%	±pp	Total	+/−
Convergence and Union (CiU)	11,833	32.59	+1.08	10	±0
Republican Left–Left Movement–Municipal Agreement (ERC–MES–AM)	5,513	15.18	+10.19	4	+4
Popular Unity Candidacy–Call for Girona–Active People (CUP–Crida–PA)	5,425	14.94	+5.66	4	+1
Socialists' Party of Catalonia–Progress Candidacy (PSC–CP)	5,265	14.50	−8.86	4	−3
Citizens–Party of the Citizenry (C's)	2,740	7.55	+6.30	2	+2
People's Party (PP)	2,163	5.96	−5.71	1	−2
Initiative for Catalonia Greens–EUiA–Agreement (ICV–EUiA–E)	1,512	4.16	−2.86	0	−2
Commitment with Girona (CG)	598	1.65	New	0	±0
Animalist Party Against Mistreatment of Animals (PACMA)	399	1.10	+0.42	0	±0
Catalan Solidarity for Independence (SI)	182	0.50	−1.95	0	±0
Blank Seats (EB)	156	0.43	−0.87	0	±0
Union, Progress and Democracy (UPyD)	86	0.24	+0.06	0	±0
Blank ballots	434	1.20	−3.21		
Total	36,306			25	±0
Valid votes	36,306	99.34	+1.13		
Invalid votes	242	0.66	−1.13		
Votes cast / turnout	36,548	56.02	+4.32		
Abstentions	28,694	43.98	−4.32		
Registered voters	65,242				

=== L'Hospitalet de Llobregat ===
Population: 253,518

← Summary of the 24 May 2015 City Council of L'Hospitalet de Llobregat election results →
Parties and alliances	Popular vote			Seats	
Parties and alliances	Votes	%	±pp	Total	+/−
Socialists' Party of Catalonia–Progress Candidacy (PSC–CP)	30,942	33.24	−5.61	11	−2
Citizens–Party of the Citizenry (C's)	12,324	13.24	+11.11	4	+4
Initiative for Catalonia Greens–EUiA–Pirates–Agreement (ICV–EUiA–P–E)^{1}	9,516	10.22	+0.32	3	+1
People's Party (PP)	9,238	9.92	−8.65	3	−3
Republican Left of Catalonia–Municipal Agreement (ERC–AM)	8,348	8.97	+6.30	2	+2
Let's Win L'Hospitalet (Ganemos)	6,949	7.46	New	2	+2
Convergence and Union (CiU)	5,579	5.99	−6.31	1	−3
Popular Unity Candidacy–Active People (CUP–PA)	4,755	5.11	+4.47	1	+1
Platform for Catalonia (PxC)	3,653	3.92	−3.40	0	−2
Union, Progress and Democracy (UPyD)	502	0.54	New	0	±0
Blank ballots	1,286	1.38	−2.65		
Total	93,092			27	±0
Valid votes	93,092	99.35	+0.81		
Invalid votes	607	0.65	−0.81		
Votes cast / turnout	93,699	53.36	+3.12		
Abstentions	81,909	46.64	−3.12		
Registered voters	175,608				
Sources
Footnotes: ^{1} Initiative for Catalonia Greens–EUiA–Pirates–Agreement results are compared to the combined totals of Initiative for Catalonia Greens–EUiA–Agreement and Pirates of Catalonia in the 2011 election.

=== Lleida ===
Population: 139,176

← Summary of the 24 May 2015 City Council of Lleida election results →
Parties and alliances	Popular vote			Seats	
Parties and alliances	Votes	%	±pp	Total	+/−
Socialists' Party of Catalonia–Progress Candidacy (PSC–CP)	12,367	24.67	−17.39	8	−7
Convergence and Union (CiU)	8,983	17.92	−0.39	6	±0
Citizens–Party of the Citizenry (C's)	5,965	11.90	+10.93	4	+4
Republican Left–Advance–Municipal Agreement (ERC–Avancem–AM)	5,656	11.28	+7.07	3	+3
Call for Lleida–Popular Unity Candidacy (Crida–CUP)	4,387	8.75	+5.49	2	+2
People's Party (PP)	4,358	8.69	−7.83	2	−4
Common of Lleida (Comú de Lleida)	3,787	7.55	New	2	+2
Agreement for Lleida–ICV–EUiA–ME–Agreement (ICV–EUiA–ME)	2,419	4.83	+0.19	0	±0
Animalist Party Against Mistreatment of Animals (PACMA)	674	1.34	+0.86	0	±0
Blank Seats (EB)	287	0.57	−0.29	0	±0
Communist Party of the Catalan People (PCPC)	176	0.35	New	0	±0
Union, Progress and Democracy (UPyD)	142	0.28	+0.10	0	±0
Blank ballots	928	1.85	−2.48		
Total	50,129			27	±0
Valid votes	50,129	99.10	+0.68		
Invalid votes	457	0.90	−0.68		
Votes cast / turnout	50,586	54.51	+4.70		
Abstentions	42,212	45.49	−4.70		
Registered voters	92,798				

=== Manresa ===
Population: 75,297

← Summary of the 24 May 2015 City Council of Manresa election results →
Parties and alliances	Popular vote			Seats	
Parties and alliances	Votes	%	±pp	Total	+/−
Convergence and Union (CiU)	8,065	29.14	−5.87	9	−2
Republican Left of Catalonia–Municipal Agreement (ERC–AM)	6,391	23.10	+11.54	7	+4
Popular Unity Candidacy–Active People (CUP–PA)	3,010	10.88	+3.47	3	+1
Socialists' Party of Catalonia–Progress Candidacy (PSC–CP)	2,963	10.71	−1.78	3	−1
Citizens–Party of the Citizenry (C's)	1,832	6.62	New	2	+2
Municipal Democracy (DM)	1,534	5.54	New	1	+1
People's Party (PP)	1,368	4.94	−4.41	0	−3
Initiative for Catalonia Greens–Agreement (ICV–E)	918	3.32	−1.01	0	±0
Better Manresa (MoVeM–RI.cat–)^{1}	591	2.14	−0.74	0	±0
Platform for Catalonia (PxC)	526	1.90	−7.05	0	−2
Blank ballots	474	1.70	−2.11		
Total	27,672			25	±0
Valid votes	27,672	99.44	+0.64		
Invalid votes	157	0.56	−0.64		
Votes cast / turnout	27,829	53.17	+1.86		
Abstentions	24,514	46.83	−1.86		
Registered voters	52,343				
Sources
Footnotes: ^{1} Better Manresa results are compared to Manresan Neighbourhood Movement totals in the 2011 election.

=== Mataró ===
Population: 124,280

← Summary of the 24 May 2015 City Council of Mataró election results →
Parties and alliances	Popular vote			Seats	
Parties and alliances	Votes	%	±pp	Total	+/−
Socialists' Party of Catalonia–Progress Candidacy (PSC–CP)	8,420	18.46	−3.85	6	−2
Convergence and Union (CiU)	7,374	16.17	−8.59	5	−3
Republican Left–Left Movement–Municipal Agreement (ERC–MES–AM)	6,648	14.58	+10.64	4	+4
We Want Mataró (VoleMataró)	5,276	11.57	New	3	+3
Citizens–Party of the Citizenry (C's)	4,409	9.67	New	3	+3
People's Party (PP)	3,862	8.47	−6.86	2	−3
Popular Unity Candidacy–Active People (CUP–PA)	3,843	8.43	+2.87	2	+1
Platform for Catalonia (PxC)	2,572	5.64	−4.79	1	−2
Initiative for Catalonia Greens–EUiA–Agreement (ICV–EUiA–E)	2,561	5.62	−1.13	1	−1
Blank ballots	639	1.40	−3.37		
Total	45,604			27	±0
Valid votes	45,604	97.80	−1.22		
Invalid votes	1,025	2.20	+1.22		
Votes cast / turnout	46,629	53.82	+0.61		
Abstentions	40,017	46.18	−0.61		
Registered voters	86,646				

=== Reus ===
Population: 104,962

← Summary of the 24 May 2015 City Council of Reus election results →
Parties and alliances	Popular vote			Seats	
Parties and alliances	Votes	%	±pp	Total	+/−
Convergence and Union (CiU)	8,307	21.42	−6.37	7	−3
Popular Unity Candidacy–Active People (CUP–PA)	6,884	17.75	+12.63	6	+5
Citizens–Party of the Citizenry (C's)	5,573	14.37	+12.84	4	+4
Socialists' Party of Catalonia–Progress Candidacy (PSC–CP)	5,334	13.75	−7.60	4	−4
National Left Reus–Municipal Agreement (ERC–MES–MDC–A–AM)	3,367	8.68	+4.52	2	+2
People's Party (PP)	3,151	8.12	−8.27	2	−4
Reus Now (A)	2,443	6.30	+1.05	2	±0
Reus Anew (DNR)	987	2.54	New	0	±0
Moving Reus–Open Assembly–Agreement (MR–AO–E)^{1}	960	2.48	−1.59	0	±0
Unitary List (Llista Unitària)	647	1.67	New	0	±0
Platform for Catalonia (PxC)	524	1.35	−3.50	0	±0
Blank ballots	609	1.57	−1.51		
Total	38,786			27	±0
Valid votes	38,786	99.05	+0.16		
Invalid votes	371	0.95	−0.16		
Votes cast / turnout	39,157	55.33	+1.43		
Abstentions	31,610	44.67	−1.43		
Registered voters	70,767				
Sources
Footnotes: ^{1} Moving Reus–Open Assembly–Agreement results are compared to Initiative for Catalonia Greens–EUiA–Agreement totals in the 2011 election.

=== Sabadell ===
Population: 207,444

← Summary of the 24 May 2015 City Council of Sabadell election results →
Parties and alliances	Popular vote			Seats	
Parties and alliances	Votes	%	±pp	Total	+/−
Socialists' Party of Catalonia–Progress Candidacy (PSC–CP)	12,950	15.41	−22.91	5	−8
Unity for Change Sabadell–Agreement (UPCS–E)^{1}	12,611	15.01	+3.53	4	±0
Republican Left of Catalonia–Municipal Agreement (ERC–AM)	12,426	14.79	+11.61	4	+4
Call for Sabadell–Alternative Candidacies–Active People (CpSBD–CAV–PA)^{2}	11,110	13.22	+2.99	4	+2
Convergence and Union (CiU)	11,092	13.20	−3.72	4	−1
Citizens–Party of the Citizenry (C's)	10,106	12.03	+10.33	3	+3
Let's Win Sabadell (Ganemos)	5,398	6.42	New	2	+2
People's Party (PP)	4,821	5.74	−4.53	1	−2
Animalist Party Against Mistreatment of Animals (PACMA)	1,712	2.04	+0.62	0	±0
Socialist Party of Labour (Internationalist) (PST (I))	272	0.32	New	0	±0
Union, Progress and Democracy (UPyD)	265	0.32	New	0	±0
Blank ballots	1,270	1.51	−2.55		
Total	84,033			27	±0
Valid votes	84,033	99.28	+0.47		
Invalid votes	608	0.72	−0.47		
Votes cast / turnout	84,641	55.15	+4.93		
Abstentions	68,843	44.85	−4.93		
Registered voters	153,484				
Sources
Footnotes: ^{1} Unity for Change Sabadell–Agreement results are compared to Initiative for Catalonia Greens–EUiA–Agreement totals in the 2011 election.; ^{2} Call for Sabadell–Alternative Candidacies–Active People results are compared to the combined totals of Agreement for Sabadell–Vallès Alternative Candidacies and Popular Unity Candidacy–Active People in the 2011 election.

=== Sant Boi de Llobregat ===
Population: 83,107

← Summary of the 24 May 2015 City Council of Sant Boi de Llobregat election results →
Parties and alliances	Popular vote			Seats	
Parties and alliances	Votes	%	±pp	Total	+/−
Socialists' Party of Catalonia–Progress Candidacy (PSC–CP)	10,793	32.42	+1.80	10	±0
Initiative for Catalonia Greens–EUiA–ME–Agreement (ICV–EUiA–ME)	4,458	13.39	+0.73	4	±0
Citizens–Party of the Citizenry (C's)	4,130	12.40	+9.06	3	+3
Republican Left of Catalonia–Municipal Agreement (ERC–AM)	3,861	11.60	+7.81	3	+3
People of Sant Boi–Popular Unity Candidacy–Active People (GdSB–CUP–PA)	2,768	8.31	+5.68	2	+2
People's Party (PP)	2,677	8.04	−9.22	2	−3
Convergence and Union–Now We Win (CiU–Ara Gua)	1,944	5.84	−5.92	1	−2
Platform for Catalonia (PxC)	1,604	4.82	−5.65	0	−3
Socialist Party of Labour (Internationalist) (PST (I))	378	1.14	New	0	±0
Union, Progress and Democracy (UPyD)	165	0.50	−0.59	0	±0
Blank ballots	518	1.54	−3.56		
Total	33,296			25	±0
Valid votes	33,296	99.14	+0.91		
Invalid votes	288	0.86	−0.91		
Votes cast / turnout	33,584	54.63	+7.13		
Abstentions	27,888	45.37	−7.13		
Registered voters	61,472				

=== Sant Cugat del Vallès ===
Population: 87,118

← Summary of the 24 May 2015 City Council of Sant Cugat del Vallès election results →
Parties and alliances	Popular vote			Seats	
Parties and alliances	Votes	%	±pp	Total	+/−
Convergence and Union (CiU)	13,524	36.98	−9.13	11	−4
Popular Unity Candidacy–CAV–Active People (CUP–CAV–PA)	5,561	15.21	+7.46	4	+2
Citizens–Party of the Citizenry (C's)	4,727	12.93	+10.68	3	+3
Republican Left–Left Movement–Municipal Agreement (ERC–MES–AM)	4,100	11.21	+6.34	3	+3
Initiative for Catalonia Greens–EUiA–Agreement (ICV–EUiA–E)	2,419	6.61	−1.90	2	±0
Socialists' Party of Catalonia–Progress Candidacy (PSC–CP)	2,366	6.47	−2.69	1	−1
People's Party (PP)	2,284	6.25	−6.29	1	−3
Vox–Family and Life Party (Vox–PFiV)^{1}	482	1.32	+0.79	0	±0
Another Sant Cugat–Citizen Platform for Sant Cugat (UASC)	479	1.97	−0.66	0	±0
Catalan Solidarity for Independence (SI)	119	0.33	−1.20	0	±0
Blank ballots	508	1.39	−3.38		
Total	36,569			25	±0
Valid votes	36,569	99.56	+1.09		
Invalid votes	161	0.44	−1.09		
Votes cast / turnout	36,730	61.13	+5.64		
Abstentions	23,352	38.87	−5.64		
Registered voters	60,082				
Sources
Footnotes: ^{1} Vox–Family and Life Party results are compared to Family and Life Party totals in the 2011 election.

=== Santa Coloma de Gramenet ===
Population: 118,738

← Summary of the 24 May 2015 City Council of Santa Coloma de Gramenet election results →
Parties and alliances	Popular vote			Seats	
Parties and alliances	Votes	%	±pp	Total	+/−
Socialists' Party of Catalonia–Progress Candidacy (PSC–CP)	17,247	40.65	+1.48	14	+2
We Are Gramenet–Active People (SG–PA)^{1}	7,872	18.56	+11.92	6	+4
Citizens–Party of the Citizenry (C's)	4,876	11.49	+9.50	3	+3
Left People–Initiative for Catalonia Greens–EUiA (GE–ICV–EUiA)	3,331	7.85	−4.09	2	−1
People's Party (PP)	3,293	7.76	−9.43	2	−3
Republican Left–Gramenet Yes–Municipal Agreement (ERC–Gramenet–AM)	2,030	4.78	+3.23	0	±0
Convergence and Union (CiU)	1,536	3.62	−2.96	0	−2
Platform for Catalonia&Neighbours of Santa Coloma (PxC&Vecinos)	1,445	3.41	−5.67	0	−3
Communist Party of the Catalan People (PCPC)	182	0.43	−0.45	0	±0
Union, Progress and Democracy (UPyD)	151	0.36	New	0	±0
Blank ballots	462	1.09	−2.71		
Total	42,425			27	±0
Valid votes	42,425	99.47	+0.73		
Invalid votes	224	0.53	−0.73		
Votes cast / turnout	42,649	54.03	+4.35		
Abstentions	36,293	45.97	−4.35		
Registered voters	78,942				
Sources
Footnotes: ^{1} We Are Gramenet–Active People results are compared to People of Gramenet totals in the 2011 election.

=== Tarragona ===
Population: 132,199

← Summary of the 24 May 2015 City Council of Tarragona election results →
Parties and alliances	Popular vote			Seats	
Parties and alliances	Votes	%	±pp	Total	+/−
Socialists' Party of Catalonia–Progress Candidacy (PSC–CP)	14,486	28.49	−8.45	9	−3
Citizens–Party of the Citizenry (C's)	7,257	14.27	+12.56	4	+4
Republican Left–MES–Catalan Democratic–AM (ERC–MES–MDC–AM)	5,963	11.73	+7.76	4	+4
People's Party (PP)	5,823	11.45	−9.10	4	−3
Convergence and Union (CiU)	5,555	10.92	−9.63	3	−4
Popular Unity Candidacy–Active People (CUP–PA)	4,182	8.22	+5.94	2	+2
Initiative for Catalonia Greens–EUiA–Agreement (ICV–EUiA–E)	2,869	5.64	+0.25	1	±0
Catalonia Now (AraCatalunya)	1,862	3.66	New	0	±0
Let's Win Tarragona (Ganemos)	1,157	2.28	New	0	±0
Animalist Party Against Mistreatment of Animals (PACMA)	684	1.35	+0.74	0	±0
Blank Seats (EB)	257	0.51	−0.57	0	±0
Union, Progress and Democracy (UPyD)	131	0.26	+0.02	0	±0
Engine and Sports Alternative (AMD)	56	0.11	−0.10	0	±0
Blank ballots	568	1.12	−2.39		
Total	50,850			27	±0
Valid votes	50,850	99.31	+0.60		
Invalid votes	354	0.69	−0.60		
Votes cast / turnout	51,204	56.31	+2.09		
Abstentions	39,726	43.69	−2.09		
Registered voters	90,930				

=== Terrassa ===
Population: 215,517

← Summary of the 24 May 2015 City Council of Terrassa election results →
Parties and alliances	Popular vote			Seats	
Parties and alliances	Votes	%	±pp	Total	+/−
Socialists' Party of Catalonia–Progress Candidacy (PSC–CP)	23,543	28.21	−4.11	9	−2
Terrassa in Common–Agreement (TeC–E)^{1}	16,051	19.24	+9.99	6	+3
Republican Left–Left Movement–Municipal Agreement (ERC–MES–AM)	11,255	13.49	+9.05	4	+4
Convergence and Union (CiU)	10,132	12.14	−12.31	3	−6
Citizens–Party of the Citizenry (C's)	9,008	10.80	+8.69	3	+3
Popular Unity Candidacy–CAV–Active People (CUP–CAV–PA)	4,804	5.76	+4.54	1	+1
People's Party (PP)	4,719	5.66	−6.59	1	−3
Platform for Catalonia (PxC)	1,656	1.98	−0.97	0	±0
Centre Union for Terrassa (UCTerrassa)	583	0.70	+0.16	0	±0
Family and Life Party (PFiV)	411	0.49	+0.22	0	±0
Union, Progress and Democracy (UPyD)	207	0.25	New	0	±0
Blank ballots	1,077	1.29	−3.31		
Total	83,446			27	±0
Valid votes	83,446	99.59	+0.99		
Invalid votes	345	0.41	−0.99		
Votes cast / turnout	83,791	54.65	+6.15		
Abstentions	69,540	45.35	−6.15		
Registered voters	153,331				
Sources
Footnotes: ^{1} Terrassa in Common–Agreement results are compared to Initiative for Catalonia Greens–EUiA–Agreement totals in the 2011 election.

== See also ==
- 2015 Catalan regional election
