= 2019 Spanish local elections in Catalonia =

This article presents the results breakdown of the local elections held in Catalonia on 26 May 2019. The following tables show detailed results in the autonomous community's most populous municipalities, sorted alphabetically.

== City control ==
The following table lists party control in the most populous municipalities, including provincial capitals (shown in bold). Gains for a party are displayed with the cell's background shaded in that party's colour.

| Municipality | Population | Previous control | New control |
|---|---|---|---|
| Badalona | 217,741 | Socialists' Party of Catalonia (PSC–PSOE) | Socialists' Party of Catalonia (PSC–PSOE) (PP in 2020; PSC–PSOE in 2021) |
| **Barcelona** | 1,620,343 | Barcelona in Common (BComú) | Barcelona in Common (BComú) |
| Cornellà de Llobregat | 87,173 | Socialists' Party of Catalonia (PSC–PSOE) | Socialists' Party of Catalonia (PSC–PSOE) |
| **Girona** | 100,266 | Together for Catalonia (JxCat–Junts) | Together for Catalonia (JxCat–Junts) |
| L'Hospitalet de Llobregat | 261,068 | Socialists' Party of Catalonia (PSC–PSOE) | Socialists' Party of Catalonia (PSC–PSOE) |
| **Lleida** | 137,856 | Socialists' Party of Catalonia (PSC–PSOE) | Republican Left of Catalonia (ERC) |
| Manresa | 76,250 | Together for Catalonia (JxCat–Junts) | Together for Catalonia (JxCat–Junts) (ERC in 2020) |
| Mataró | 126,988 | Socialists' Party of Catalonia (PSC–PSOE) | Socialists' Party of Catalonia (PSC–PSOE) |
| Reus | 103,477 | Together for Catalonia (JxCat–Junts) | Together for Catalonia (JxCat–Junts) |
| Rubí | 76,423 | Socialists' Party of Catalonia (PSC–PSOE) | Socialists' Party of Catalonia (PSC–PSOE) |
| Sabadell | 211,734 | Popular Unity Candidacy (CUP) | Socialists' Party of Catalonia (PSC–PSOE) |
| Sant Boi de Llobregat | 82,904 | Socialists' Party of Catalonia (PSC–PSOE) | Socialists' Party of Catalonia (PSC–PSOE) |
| Sant Cugat del Vallès | 90,664 | Together for Catalonia (JxCat–Junts) | Republican Left of Catalonia (ERC) |
| Santa Coloma de Gramenet | 118,821 | Socialists' Party of Catalonia (PSC–PSOE) | Socialists' Party of Catalonia (PSC–PSOE) |
| **Tarragona** | 132,299 | Socialists' Party of Catalonia (PSC–PSOE) | Republican Left of Catalonia (ERC) |
| Terrassa | 218,535 | Socialists' Party of Catalonia (PSC–PSOE) | All for Terrassa (TxT) |

== Municipalities ==
=== Badalona ===
Population: 217,741

← Summary of the 26 May 2019 City Council of Badalona election results →
| Parties and alliances | Popular vote | | | Seats | |
| Parties and alliances | Votes | % | ±pp | Total | +/− |
|---|---|---|---|---|---|
| People's Party (PP) | 37,539 | 37.59 | +3.38 | 11 | +1 |
| Let's Win Badalona in Common (GBeC–ERC–A–MES–AM)^{1} | 24,485 | 24.52 | −3.97 | 7 | −1 |
| Socialists' Party of Catalonia–United–Progress Candidacy (PSC–CP) | 19,913 | 19.94 | +5.85 | 6 | +2 |
| Badalona in Common We Can–In Common We Win (BComúP–ECG)^{2} | 8,503 | 8.52 | +1.84 | 2 | ±0 |
| Together for Catalonia–Badalona (JxCat–Junts)^{3} | 5,140 | 5.15 | −2.79 | 1 | −1 |
| Citizens–Party of the Citizenry (Cs) | 1,772 | 1.77 | −3.83 | 0 | −1 |
| You Are Badalona (TEB) | 1,247 | 1.25 | New | 0 | ±0 |
| Vox (Vox) | 391 | 0.39 | New | 0 | ±0 |
| Transparent People for Badalona Assembly (AGT) | 278 | 0.28 | New | 0 | ±0 |
| We Are Identitaries (SOMI) | 61 | 0.06 | New | 0 | ±0 |
| Blank ballots | 526 | 0.53 | −0.81 | | |
| Total | 99,855 | | | 27 | ±0 |
| Valid votes | 99,855 | 99.73 | +0.29 | | |
| Invalid votes | 272 | 0.27 | −0.29 | | |
| Votes cast / turnout | 100,127 | 63.84 | +6.31 | | |
| Abstentions | 56,704 | 36.16 | −6.31 | | |
| Registered voters | 156,831 | | | | |
Sources
Footnotes: ^{1} Let's Win Badalona in Common results are compared to the combined totals of Let's Win Badalona–Badalona in Common–Active People and ERC–Advance–Left Movement–Municipal Agreement in the 2015 election.; ^{2} Badalona in Common We Can–In Common We Win results are compared to Initiative Greens–EUiA–It is Possible–Agreement totals in the 2015 election.; ^{3} Together for Catalonia–Badalona results are compared to Convergence and Union totals in the 2015 election.

=== Barcelona ===
Population: 1,620,343

=== Cornellà de Llobregat ===
Population: 87,173

← Summary of the 26 May 2019 City Council of Cornellà de Llobregat election results →
| Parties and alliances | Popular vote | | | Seats | |
| Parties and alliances | Votes | % | ±pp | Total | +/− |
|---|---|---|---|---|---|
| Socialists' Party of Catalonia–Progress Candidacy (PSC–CP) | 18,184 | 47.45 | +8.89 | 14 | +3 |
| Republican Left of Catalonia–Municipal Agreement (ERC–AM) | 5,387 | 14.06 | +4.84 | 4 | +2 |
| Citizens–Party of the Citizenry (Cs) | 3,813 | 9.95 | −1.33 | 3 | ±0 |
| We Can (Podemos)^{1} | 2,960 | 7.72 | −9.70 | 2 | −3 |
| In Common–We Move Cornellà–In Common We Win (EC–MC–ECG)^{2} | 2,785 | 7.27 | −0.87 | 2 | ±0 |
| People's Party (PP) | 1,820 | 4.75 | −3.06 | 0 | −2 |
| Cornellà Left Alternative–Pirates.CUP–Alternative (AECornellà–CUP–AMunt) | 1,344 | 3.51 | New | 0 | ±0 |
| Together for Cornellà–Together for Catalonia (JxC–JxCat–Junts)^{3} | 979 | 2.55 | −1.63 | 0 | ±0 |
| Vox (Vox) | 804 | 2.10 | New | 0 | ±0 |
| Left in Positive (IZQP) | 64 | 0.17 | New | 0 | ±0 |
| Blank ballots | 184 | 0.48 | −0.59 | | |
| Total | 38,324 | | | 25 | ±0 |
| Valid votes | 38,324 | 99.74 | +0.30 | | |
| Invalid votes | 99 | 0.26 | −0.30 | | |
| Votes cast / turnout | 38,423 | 61.03 | +4.59 | | |
| Abstentions | 24,535 | 38.97 | −4.59 | | |
| Registered voters | 62,958 | | | | |
Sources
Footnotes: ^{1} We Can results are compared to Cornellà in Common–Call for Cornellà totals in the 2015 election.; ^{2} In Common–We Move Cornellà–In Common We Win results are compared to Initiative for Catalonia Greens–EUiA–Progress Agreement totals in the 2015 election.; ^{3} Together for Cornellà–Together for Catalonia results are compared to Convergence and Union totals in the 2015 election.

=== Girona ===
Population: 100,266

← Summary of the 26 May 2019 City Council of Girona election results →
| Parties and alliances | Popular vote | | | Seats | |
| Parties and alliances | Votes | % | ±pp | Total | +/− |
|---|---|---|---|---|---|
| Together for Catalonia–Girona (JxCat–Junts)^{1} | 13,435 | 30.96 | −1.63 | 9 | −1 |
| Let's Win Girona–Municipalist Alternative (GGI–AMunt)^{2} | 8,311 | 19.15 | +4.21 | 6 | +2 |
| Socialists' Party of Catalonia–Progress Candidacy (PSC–CP) | 8,123 | 18.72 | +4.22 | 6 | +2 |
| Republican Left of Catalonia–Municipal Agreement (ERC–AM) | 6,289 | 14.49 | −0.69 | 4 | ±0 |
| Citizens–Party of the Citizenry (Cs) | 2,891 | 6.66 | −0.89 | 2 | ±0 |
| Girona in Common We Can–In Common We Win (GeCP–ECG)^{3} | 1,483 | 3.42 | −0.74 | 0 | ±0 |
| People's Party (PP) | 1,429 | 3.29 | −2.67 | 0 | −1 |
| Vox (Vox) | 594 | 1.37 | New | 0 | ±0 |
| Animalist Party Against Mistreatment of Animals (PACMA) | 439 | 1.01 | −0.09 | 0 | ±0 |
| Catalan Sovereigntist Bloc (Bloc SC) | 157 | 0.36 | New | 0 | ±0 |
| Blank ballots | 243 | 0.56 | −0.64 | | |
| Total | 43,394 | | | 27 | +2 |
| Valid votes | 43,394 | 99.65 | +0.31 | | |
| Invalid votes | 154 | 0.35 | −0.31 | | |
| Votes cast / turnout | 43,548 | 65.10 | +9.08 | | |
| Abstentions | 23,346 | 34.90 | −9.08 | | |
| Registered voters | 66,894 | | | | |
Sources
Footnotes: ^{1} Together for Catalonia–Girona results are compared to Convergence and Union totals in the 2015 election.; ^{2} Let's Win Girona–Municipalist Alternative results are compared to Popular Unity Candidacy–Call for Girona–Active People totals in the 2015 election.; ^{3} Girona in Common We Can–In Common We Win results are compared to Initiative for Catalonia Greens–EUiA–Agreement totals in the 2015 election.

=== L'Hospitalet de Llobregat ===
Population: 261,068

← Summary of the 26 May 2019 City Council of L'Hospitalet de Llobregat election results →
| Parties and alliances | Popular vote | | | Seats | |
| Parties and alliances | Votes | % | ±pp | Total | +/− |
|---|---|---|---|---|---|
| Socialists' Party of Catalonia–Progress Candidacy (PSC–CP) | 43,696 | 43.35 | +10.11 | 14 | +3 |
| Republican Left of Catalonia–Municipal Agreement (ERC–AM) | 16,342 | 16.21 | +7.24 | 5 | +3 |
| Citizens–Party of the Citizenry (Cs) | 11,899 | 11.80 | −1.44 | 4 | ±0 |
| L'Hospitalet in Common We Can–In Common We Win (LHECP–ECG)^{1} | 11,280 | 11.19 | −6.49 | 3 | −2 |
| People's Party (PP) | 5,199 | 5.16 | −4.76 | 1 | −2 |
| Together for L'Hospitalet (Junts)^{2} | 3,486 | 3.46 | −2.53 | 0 | −1 |
| Vox (Vox) | 3,148 | 3.12 | New | 0 | ±0 |
| L'Hospitalet CUP of Rupture–Municipalist Alternative (CUP LHxLR–AMunt) | 2,077 | 2.06 | −3.05 | 0 | −1 |
| L'Hospitalet Left Alternative (AELH) | 916 | 0.91 | New | 0 | ±0 |
| Coalition for L'Hospitalet (CH) | 870 | 0.86 | New | 0 | ±0 |
| L'Hospitalet Front–Catalonia Primaries (Primàries) | 612 | 0.61 | New | 0 | ±0 |
| Citizen Force (FC's) | 289 | 0.29 | New | 0 | ±0 |
| Left in Positive (IZQP) | 207 | 0.21 | New | 0 | ±0 |
| We Propose for the Minorities (Proponemos XM) | 192 | 0.19 | New | 0 | ±0 |
| Effective Democracy (D.EF) | 84 | 0.08 | New | 0 | ±0 |
| Convergents (CNV) | 66 | 0.07 | New | 0 | ±0 |
| Blank ballots | 446 | 0.44 | −0.94 | | |
| Total | 100,809 | | | 27 | ±0 |
| Valid votes | 100,809 | 99.61 | +0.26 | | |
| Invalid votes | 393 | 0.39 | −0.26 | | |
| Votes cast / turnout | 101,202 | 57.48 | +4.12 | | |
| Abstentions | 74,852 | 42.52 | −4.12 | | |
| Registered voters | 176,054 | | | | |
Sources
Footnotes: ^{1} L'Hospitalet in Common We Can–In Common We Win results are compared to the combined totals of Initiative for Catalonia Greens–EUiA–Pirates–Agreement and Let's Win L'Hospitalet in the 2015 election.; ^{2} Together for L'Hospitalet results are compared to Convergence and Union totals in the 2015 election.

=== Lleida ===
Population: 137,856

← Summary of the 26 May 2019 City Council of Lleida election results →
| Parties and alliances | Popular vote | | | Seats | |
| Parties and alliances | Votes | % | ±pp | Total | +/− |
|---|---|---|---|---|---|
| Republican Left of Catalonia–Municipal Agreement (ERC–AM) | 13,402 | 23.77 | +12.49 | 7 | +4 |
| Socialists' Party–Commitment to Lleida–Progress Candidacy (PSC–CxLL–CP) | 13,321 | 23.63 | −1.04 | 7 | −1 |
| Together for Catalonia–Lleida (JxCat–Junts)^{1} | 10,765 | 19.09 | +1.17 | 6 | ±0 |
| Citizens–Party of the Citizenry (Cs) | 5,521 | 9.79 | −2.11 | 3 | −1 |
| Common of Lleida–We Can–In Common We Win (Comudelleida–ECG)^{2} | 4,896 | 8.68 | −3.70 | 2 | ±0 |
| People's Party (PP) | 3,416 | 6.06 | −2.63 | 2 | ±0 |
| Call for Lleida–CUP–Municipalist Alternative (Crida–CUP–AMunt) | 2,434 | 4.32 | −4.43 | 0 | −2 |
| Vox (Vox) | 895 | 1.59 | New | 0 | ±0 |
| Lleida Primaries–Catalonia Primaries (Primàries) | 869 | 1.54 | New | 0 | ±0 |
| Now–United Lleida (A–U) | 166 | 0.29 | New | 0 | ±0 |
| Catalan Sovereigntist Bloc (Bloc SC) | 111 | 0.20 | New | 0 | ±0 |
| Communist Party of the Catalan People (PCPC) | 104 | 0.18 | −0.17 | 0 | ±0 |
| Convergents (CNV) | 92 | 0.16 | New | 0 | ±0 |
| Blank ballots | 393 | 0.70 | −1.15 | | |
| Total | 56,385 | | | 27 | ±0 |
| Valid votes | 56,385 | 99.61 | +0.51 | | |
| Invalid votes | 223 | 0.39 | −0.51 | | |
| Votes cast / turnout | 56,608 | 60.66 | +6.15 | | |
| Abstentions | 36,707 | 39.34 | −6.15 | | |
| Registered voters | 93,315 | | | | |
Sources
Footnotes: ^{1} Together for Catalonia–Lleida results are compared to Convergence and Union totals in the 2015 election.; ^{2} Common of Lleida–We Can–In Common We Win results are compared to the combined totals of Common of Lleida and Agreement for Lleida–ICV–EUiA–ME–Agreement in the 2015 election.

=== Manresa ===
Population: 76,250

← Summary of the 26 May 2019 City Council of Manresa election results →
| Parties and alliances | Popular vote | | | Seats | |
| Parties and alliances | Votes | % | ±pp | Total | +/− |
|---|---|---|---|---|---|
| Republican Left of Catalonia–Municipal Agreement (ERC–AM) | 9,119 | 28.14 | +5.04 | 8 | +1 |
| Together for Manresa (JxCat–Junts)^{1} | 9,109 | 28.11 | −1.03 | 8 | −1 |
| Socialists' Party of Catalonia–Progress Candidacy (PSC–CP) | 4,743 | 14.64 | +3.93 | 4 | +1 |
| Let's Make Manresa–CUP–Sovereigntists–Municipalist Alternative (Fem–AMunt) | 3,269 | 10.09 | −0.79 | 3 | ±0 |
| Citizens–Party of the Citizenry (Cs) | 2,282 | 7.04 | +0.42 | 2 | ±0 |
| Manresa in Common–In Common We Win (MEC–ECG)^{2} | 988 | 3.05 | −0.27 | 0 | ±0 |
| People's Party (PP) | 840 | 2.59 | −2.35 | 0 | ±0 |
| Manresa Primaries–Catalonia Primaries (Primàries) | 792 | 2.44 | New | 0 | ±0 |
| We Can (Podemos) | 583 | 1.80 | New | 0 | ±0 |
| Vox (Vox) | 429 | 1.32 | New | 0 | ±0 |
| Municipal Democracy (DM) | n/a | n/a | −5.54 | 0 | −1 |
| Blank ballots | 252 | 0.78 | −0.92 | | |
| Total | 32,406 | | | 25 | ±0 |
| Valid votes | 32,406 | 99.67 | +0.23 | | |
| Invalid votes | 107 | 0.33 | −0.23 | | |
| Votes cast / turnout | 32,513 | 61.61 | +8.44 | | |
| Abstentions | 20,262 | 38.39 | −8.44 | | |
| Registered voters | 52,775 | | | | |
Sources
Footnotes: ^{1} Together for Manresa results are compared to Convergence and Union totals in the 2015 election.; ^{2} Manresa in Common–In Common We Win results are compared to Initiative for Catalonia Greens–Agreement totals in the 2015 election.

=== Mataró ===
Population: 126,988

← Summary of the 26 May 2019 City Council of Mataró election results →
| Parties and alliances | Popular vote | | | Seats | |
| Parties and alliances | Votes | % | ±pp | Total | +/− |
|---|---|---|---|---|---|
| Socialists' Party of Catalonia–Progress Candidacy (PSC–CP) | 21,542 | 38.74 | +20.28 | 13 | +7 |
| Republican Left–Left Movement–Municipal Agreement (ERC–MES–AM) | 14,561 | 26.19 | +11.61 | 8 | +4 |
| In Common We Can Mataró–In Common We Win (ECPM–ECG)^{1} | 3,746 | 6.74 | +1.12 | 2 | +1 |
| Together for Mataró (Junts)^{2} | 3,633 | 6.53 | −9.64 | 2 | −3 |
| Citizens–Party of the Citizenry (Cs) | 3,413 | 6.14 | −3.53 | 2 | −1 |
| Mataró Popular Unity Candidacy–Municipalist Alternative (CUP–AMunt) | 2,624 | 4.72 | −3.71 | 0 | −2 |
| Vox (Vox) | 2,277 | 4.09 | New | 0 | ±0 |
| People's Party (PP) | 2,109 | 3.79 | −4.68 | 0 | −2 |
| Mataró Primaries–Catalonia Primaries (Primàries) | 939 | 1.69 | New | 0 | ±0 |
| We Want Mataró–We Are Alternative–F! (F!) | 517 | 0.93 | −10.64 | 0 | −3 |
| Platform for Catalonia (PxC) | n/a | n/a | −5.64 | 0 | −1 |
| Blank ballots | 247 | 0.44 | −0.96 | | |
| Total | 55,608 | | | 27 | ±0 |
| Valid votes | 55,608 | 99.77 | +1.97 | | |
| Invalid votes | 127 | 0.23 | −1.97 | | |
| Votes cast / turnout | 55,735 | 63.56 | +9.74 | | |
| Abstentions | 31,960 | 36.44 | −9.74 | | |
| Registered voters | 87,695 | | | | |
Sources
Footnotes: ^{1} In Common We Can Mataró–In Common We Win results are compared to Initiative for Catalonia Greens–EUiA–Agreement totals in the 2015 election.; ^{2} Together for Mataró results are compared to Convergence and Union totals in the 2015 election.

=== Reus ===
Population: 103,477

← Summary of the 26 May 2019 City Council of Reus election results →
| Parties and alliances | Popular vote | | | Seats | |
| Parties and alliances | Votes | % | ±pp | Total | +/− |
|---|---|---|---|---|---|
| Together for Reus (JxCat–Junts)^{1} | 9,643 | 22.24 | +0.82 | 7 | ±0 |
| Republican Left of Catalonia–Municipal Agreement (ERC–AM) | 7,434 | 17.15 | +8.47 | 6 | +4 |
| Socialists' Party of Catalonia–Progress Candidacy (PSC–CP) | 7,329 | 16.90 | +3.15 | 6 | +2 |
| Citizens–Party of the Citizenry (Cs) | 4,624 | 10.67 | −3.70 | 3 | −1 |
| Popular Unity Candidacy–Municipalist Alternative (CUP–AMunt) | 3,760 | 8.67 | −9.08 | 3 | −3 |
| Reus Now (A) | 2,793 | 6.44 | +0.14 | 2 | ±0 |
| People's Party (PP) | 2,046 | 4.72 | −3.40 | 0 | −2 |
| In Common We Can Reus–In Common We Win (ECP–ECG) | 2,012 | 4.64 | New | 0 | ±0 |
| Vox (Vox) | 1,180 | 2.72 | New | 0 | ±0 |
| Reus Among Neighbours (EVR) | 794 | 1.83 | New | 0 | ±0 |
| Reus for the Republic–Primaries (Primàries) | 791 | 1.82 | New | 0 | ±0 |
| dCIDE (Of Spanish Centre-Left) (dCIDE) | 650 | 1.50 | New | 0 | ±0 |
| Blank ballots | 300 | 0.69 | −0.88 | | |
| Total | 43,356 | | | 27 | ±0 |
| Valid votes | 43,356 | 99.60 | +0.55 | | |
| Invalid votes | 174 | 0.40 | −0.55 | | |
| Votes cast / turnout | 43,530 | 60.70 | +5.37 | | |
| Abstentions | 28,184 | 39.30 | −5.37 | | |
| Registered voters | 71,714 | | | | |
Sources
Footnotes: ^{1} Together for Reus results are compared to Convergence and Union totals in the 2015 election.

=== Rubí ===
Population: 76,423

← Summary of the 26 May 2019 City Council of Rubí election results →
| Parties and alliances | Popular vote | | | Seats | |
| Parties and alliances | Votes | % | ±pp | Total | +/− |
|---|---|---|---|---|---|
| Socialists' Party of Catalonia–Progress Candidacy (PSC–CP) | 10,492 | 33.02 | +12.35 | 10 | +4 |
| Republican Left of Catalonia–Municipal Agreement (ERC–AM) | 7,232 | 22.76 | +7.27 | 7 | +2 |
| In Common We Can Rubí–In Common We Win (ECP Rubí–ECG)^{1} | 3,388 | 10.66 | +1.38 | 3 | +1 |
| Citizens–Party of the Citizenry (Cs) | 3,301 | 10.39 | −3.94 | 3 | −1 |
| Neighbours for Rubí (VR) | 2,055 | 6.47 | +0.78 | 1 | ±0 |
| Popular Unity Alternative–Municipalist Alternative (AUP–AMunt) | 1,621 | 5.10 | −5.35 | 1 | −2 |
| Together for Rubí (JxR–Junts)^{2} | 1,378 | 4.34 | −4.32 | 0 | −2 |
| People's Party (PP) | 1,171 | 3.69 | −4.85 | 0 | −2 |
| Vox (Vox) | 715 | 2.25 | New | 0 | ±0 |
| Republican Rubí–Catalonia Primaries (Primàries) | 282 | 0.89 | New | 0 | ±0 |
| Blank ballots | 140 | 0.44 | −1.08 | | |
| Total | 31,775 | | | 25 | ±0 |
| Valid votes | 31,775 | 99.72 | +0.36 | | |
| Invalid votes | 90 | 0.28 | −0.36 | | |
| Votes cast / turnout | 31,865 | 57.71 | +6.69 | | |
| Abstentions | 23,354 | 42.29 | −6.69 | | |
| Registered voters | 55,219 | | | | |
Sources
Footnotes: ^{1} In Common We Can Rubí–In Common We Win results are compared to Initiative for Catalonia Greens–Agreement totals in the 2015 election.; ^{2} Together for Rubí results are compared to Convergence and Union totals in the 2015 election.

=== Sabadell ===
Population: 211,734

← Summary of the 26 May 2019 City Council of Sabadell election results →
| Parties and alliances | Popular vote | | | Seats | |
| Parties and alliances | Votes | % | ±pp | Total | +/- |
|---|---|---|---|---|---|
| Socialists' Party of Catalonia–Progress Candidacy (PSC–CP) | 28,808 | 29.86 | +14.45 | 10 | +5 |
| Republican Left of Catalonia–Municipal Agreement (ERC–AM) | 19,284 | 19.99 | +5.20 | 7 | +3 |
| Call for Sabadell–Municipalist Alternative (CpSBD–AMunt) | 10,737 | 11.13 | −2.09 | 3 | −1 |
| Citizens–Party of the Citizenry (Cs) | 9,865 | 10.22 | −1.81 | 3 | ±0 |
| Together for Sabadell (Junts)^{1} | 9,005 | 9.33 | −3.87 | 3 | −1 |
| We Can (Podemos) | 5,052 | 5.24 | New | 1 | +1 |
| Sabadell in Common–In Common We Win (SBDeC–ECG)^{2} | 3,890 | 4.03 | −10.98 | 0 | −4 |
| People's Party (PP) | 2,811 | 2.91 | −2.83 | 0 | −1 |
| 100% Sabadell (GS–SSP) | 2,269 | 2.35 | New | 0 | ±0 |
| Vox (Vox) | 1,794 | 1.86 | New | 0 | ±0 |
| Independence and Republic–Catalonia Primaries (Primàries) | 1,179 | 1.22 | New | 0 | ±0 |
| Sabadell Now (A) | 580 | 0.60 | New | 0 | ±0 |
| Sabadell New Participation (NPS) | 307 | 0.32 | New | 0 | ±0 |
| We Are Catalan (SOM) | 144 | 0.15 | New | 0 | ±0 |
| Let's Win Sabadell (Ganemos) | 142 | 0.15 | −6.27 | 0 | −2 |
| Blank Seats (EB) | 122 | 0.13 | New | 0 | ±0 |
| Blank ballots | 495 | 0.51 | −1.00 | | |
| Total | 96,484 | | | 27 | ±0 |
| Valid votes | 96,484 | 99.70 | +0.42 | | |
| Invalid votes | 292 | 0.30 | −0.42 | | |
| Votes cast / turnout | 96,776 | 62.55 | +7.40 | | |
| Abstentions | 57,945 | 37.45 | −7.40 | | |
| Registered voters | 154,721 | | | | |
Sources
Footnotes: ^{1} Together for Sabadell results are compared to Convergence and Union totals in the 2015 election.; ^{2} Sabadell in Common–In Common We Win results are compared to Unity for Change Sabadell–Agreement totals in the 2015 election.

=== Sant Boi de Llobregat ===
Population: 82,904

← Summary of the 26 May 2019 City Council of Sant Boi de Llobregat election results →
| Parties and alliances | Popular vote | | | Seats | |
| Parties and alliances | Votes | % | ±pp | Total | +/− |
|---|---|---|---|---|---|
| Socialists' Party of Catalonia–Progress Candidacy (PSC–CP) | 16,001 | 42.85 | +10.43 | 13 | +3 |
| Republican Left of Catalonia–Municipal Agreement (ERC–AM) | 6,233 | 16.69 | +5.09 | 5 | +2 |
| Citizens–Party of the Citizenry (Cs) | 3,915 | 10.48 | −1.92 | 3 | ±0 |
| Sant Boi in Common–In Common We Win (SBeC–ECG)^{1} | 2,758 | 7.39 | −6.00 | 2 | −2 |
| We Can–Unitary Left (Podemos–Esquerra Unitaria) | 2,756 | 7.38 | New | 2 | +2 |
| Together for Sant Boi (Junts)^{2} | 1,743 | 4.67 | −1.17 | 0 | −1 |
| People's Party (PP) | 1,633 | 4.37 | −3.67 | 0 | −2 |
| Let's Win Sant Boi–Municipalist Alternative (GuanyemSB–AMunt)^{3} | 1,451 | 3.89 | −4.42 | 0 | −2 |
| Vox (Vox) | 667 | 1.79 | New | 0 | ±0 |
| Blank ballots | 184 | 0.49 | −1.05 | | |
| Total | 37,341 | | | 25 | ±0 |
| Valid votes | 37,341 | 99.62 | +0.48 | | |
| Invalid votes | 144 | 0.38 | −0.48 | | |
| Votes cast / turnout | 37,485 | 60.03 | +5.40 | | |
| Abstentions | 24,960 | 39.97 | −5.40 | | |
| Registered voters | 62,445 | | | | |
Sources
Footnotes: ^{1} Sant Boi in Common–In Common We Win results are compared to Initiative for Catalonia Greens–EUiA–ME–Agreement totals in the 2015 election.; ^{2} Together for Sant Boi results are compared to Convergence and Union–Now We Win totals in the 2015 election.; ^{3} Let's Win Sant Boi–Municipalist Alternative results are compared to People of Sant Boi–Popular Unity Candidacy–Active People totals in the 2015 election.

=== Sant Cugat del Vallès ===
Population: 90,664

← Summary of the 26 May 2019 City Council of Sant Cugat del Vallès election results →
| Parties and alliances | Popular vote | | | Seats | |
| Parties and alliances | Votes | % | ±pp | Total | +/− |
|---|---|---|---|---|---|
| Together for Sant Cugat (Junts)^{1} | 12,146 | 27.53 | −9.45 | 9 | −2 |
| Republican Left–Left Movement–Municipal Agreement (ERC–MES–AM) | 8,591 | 19.47 | +8.26 | 6 | +3 |
| Socialists' Party–Better for Sant Cugat–Progress Candidacy (PSC–MpSC–CP) | 5,360 | 12.15 | +5.68 | 4 | +3 |
| Citizens–Party of the Citizenry (Cs) | 5,188 | 11.76 | −1.17 | 3 | ±0 |
| Popular Unity Candidacy–Municipalist Alternative (CUP–AMunt) | 4,871 | 11.04 | −4.17 | 3 | −1 |
| People's Party (PP) | 1,935 | 4.39 | −1.86 | 0 | −1 |
| Sant Cugat in Common–In Common We Win (SCeC–ECG)^{2} | 1,708 | 3.87 | −2.74 | 0 | −2 |
| United for Sant Cugat (Units per Sant Cugat) | 1,195 | 2.71 | New | 0 | ±0 |
| We Can (Podemos) | 1,176 | 2.67 | New | 0 | ±0 |
| Vox (Vox) | 864 | 1.96 | +0.64 | 0 | ±0 |
| Sant Cugat for Independence–Catalonia Primaries (Primàries) | 546 | 1.24 | New | 0 | ±0 |
| We Propose for the Minorities (Proposem XM) | 250 | 0.57 | New | 0 | ±0 |
| Blank ballots | 297 | 0.67 | −0.72 | | |
| Total | 44,127 | | | 25 | ±0 |
| Valid votes | 44,127 | 99.84 | +0.28 | | |
| Invalid votes | 70 | 0.16 | −0.28 | | |
| Votes cast / turnout | 44,197 | 70.59 | +9.46 | | |
| Abstentions | 18,413 | 29.41 | −9.46 | | |
| Registered voters | 62,610 | | | | |
Sources
Footnotes: ^{1} Together for Sant Cugat results are compared to Convergence and Union totals in the 2015 election.; ^{2} Sant Cugat in Common–In Common We Win results are compared to Initiative for Catalonia Greens–EUiA–Agreement totals in the 2015 election.

=== Santa Coloma de Gramenet ===
Population: 118,821

← Summary of the 26 May 2019 City Council of Santa Coloma de Gramenet election results →
| Parties and alliances | Popular vote | | | Seats | |
| Parties and alliances | Votes | % | ±pp | Total | +/− |
|---|---|---|---|---|---|
| Socialists' Party of Catalonia–Progress Candidacy (PSC–CP) | 22,913 | 50.94 | +10.29 | 17 | +3 |
| Citizens–Party of the Citizenry (Cs) | 6,349 | 14.12 | +2.63 | 4 | +1 |
| In Common We Can Santa Coloma–In Common We Win (ECP–SCG–ECG)^{1} | 4,871 | 10.83 | +2.98 | 3 | +1 |
| Republican Left of Catalonia–Municipal Agreement (ERC–AM) | 4,460 | 9.92 | +5.14 | 3 | +3 |
| We Are Gramenet–Municipalist Alternative (SG–AMunt) | 2,242 | 4.98 | −13.58 | 0 | −6 |
| People's Party (PP) | 1,918 | 4.26 | −3.50 | 0 | −2 |
| Together for Catalonia–Santa Coloma (JxCat–Junts)^{2} | 939 | 2.09 | −1.53 | 0 | ±0 |
| Vox (Vox) | 871 | 1.94 | New | 0 | ±0 |
| Communist Party of the Catalan People (PCPC) | 150 | 0.33 | −0.10 | 0 | ±0 |
| Convergents (CNV) | 70 | 0.16 | New | 0 | ±0 |
| Blank ballots | 193 | 0.43 | −0.66 | | |
| Total | 44,976 | | | 27 | ±0 |
| Valid votes | 44,976 | 99.59 | +0.12 | | |
| Invalid votes | 187 | 0.41 | −0.12 | | |
| Votes cast / turnout | 45,163 | 57.89 | +3.86 | | |
| Abstentions | 32,846 | 42.11 | −3.86 | | |
| Registered voters | 78,009 | | | | |
Sources
Footnotes: ^{1} In Common We Can Santa Coloma–In Common We Win results are compared to Left People–Initiative for Catalonia Greens–EUiA totals in the 2015 election.; ^{2} Together for Catalonia–Santa Coloma results are compared to Convergence and Union totals in the 2015 election.

=== Tarragona ===
Population: 132,299

← Summary of the 26 May 2019 City Council of Tarragona election results →
| Parties and alliances | Popular vote | | | Seats | |
| Parties and alliances | Votes | % | ±pp | Total | +/− |
|---|---|---|---|---|---|
| Socialists' Party of Catalonia–Progress Candidacy (PSC–CP) | 13,416 | 23.38 | −5.11 | 7 | −2 |
| Republican Left–Left Movement–Municipal Agreement (ERC–MES–AM) | 12,969 | 22.60 | +10.87 | 7 | +3 |
| Citizens–Party of the Citizenry (Cs) | 8,439 | 14.71 | +0.44 | 4 | ±0 |
| Together for Tarragona (Junts)^{1} | 6,395 | 11.14 | +0.22 | 3 | ±0 |
| In Common We Can Tarragona–In Common We Win (ECP–TGN–ECG)^{2} | 4,590 | 8.00 | +2.36 | 2 | +1 |
| Popular Unity Candidacy–Municipalist Alternative (CUP–AMunt) | 3,659 | 6.38 | −1.84 | 2 | ±0 |
| People's Party (PP) | 3,595 | 6.27 | −5.18 | 2 | −2 |
| Vox (Vox) | 1,701 | 2.96 | New | 0 | ±0 |
| Now (A) | 1,039 | 1.81 | −1.85 | 0 | ±0 |
| Animalist Party Against Mistreatment of Animals (PACMA) | 626 | 1.09 | −0.26 | 0 | ±0 |
| Centered for Tarragona (C.TGN) | 400 | 0.70 | New | 0 | ±0 |
| Assembly for Tarragona (A per TGN) | 278 | 0.48 | New | 0 | ±0 |
| Blank ballots | 274 | 0.48 | −0.64 | | |
| Total | 57,381 | | | 27 | ±0 |
| Valid votes | 57,381 | 99.62 | +0.31 | | |
| Invalid votes | 220 | 0.38 | −0.31 | | |
| Votes cast / turnout | 57,601 | 62.80 | +6.49 | | |
| Abstentions | 34,126 | 37.20 | −6.49 | | |
| Registered voters | 91,727 | | | | |
Sources
Footnotes: ^{1} Together for Tarragona results are compared to Convergence and Union totals in the 2015 election.; ^{2} In Common We Can Tarragona–In Common We Win results are compared to Initiative for Catalonia Greens–EUiA–Agreement totals in the 2015 election.

=== Terrassa ===
Population: 218,535

← Summary of the 26 May 2019 City Council of Terrassa election results →
| Parties and alliances | Popular vote | | | Seats | |
| Parties and alliances | Votes | % | ±pp | Total | +/− |
|---|---|---|---|---|---|
| All for Terrassa (TxT) | 27,972 | 29.28 | New | 10 | +10 |
| Socialists' Party of Catalonia–Progress Candidacy (PSC–CP) | 19,638 | 20.56 | −7.65 | 7 | −2 |
| Republican Left–Left Movement–Municipal Agreement (ERC–MES–AM) | 14,263 | 14.93 | +1.44 | 5 | +1 |
| Citizens–Party of the Citizenry (Cs) | 7,747 | 8.11 | −2.69 | 3 | ±0 |
| Together for Terrassa (Junts)^{1} | 7,225 | 7.56 | −4.58 | 2 | −1 |
| Terrassa in Common–In Common We Win (TeC–ECG) | 4,637 | 4.85 | −14.39 | 0 | −6 |
| We Can–Green Initiative–Left Unity for Terrassa (Podem–IVE) | 3,511 | 3.68 | New | 0 | ±0 |
| Popular Unity Candidacy–Municipalist Alternative (CUP–AMunt) | 3,427 | 3.59 | −2.17 | 0 | −1 |
| People's Party (PP) | 2,958 | 3.10 | −2.56 | 0 | −1 |
| Vox (Vox) | 2,224 | 2.33 | New | 0 | ±0 |
| Terrassa for the Republic–Catalonia Primaries (Primàries) | 1,233 | 1.29 | New | 0 | ±0 |
| Family and Life Party (PFiV) | 288 | 0.30 | −0.19 | 0 | ±0 |
| Blank ballots | 409 | 0.43 | −0.86 | | |
| Total | 95,532 | | | 27 | ±0 |
| Valid votes | 95,532 | 99.77 | +0.18 | | |
| Invalid votes | 224 | 0.23 | −0.18 | | |
| Votes cast / turnout | 95,756 | 61.33 | +6.68 | | |
| Abstentions | 60,367 | 38.67 | −6.68 | | |
| Registered voters | 156,123 | | | | |
Sources
Footnotes: ^{1} Together for Terrassa results are compared to Convergence and Union totals in the 2015 election.
