= Sub-national opinion polling for the 2026 Spanish general election =

In the run up to the 2026 Spanish general election, various organisations carry out opinion polling to gauge voting intention in autonomous communities and constituencies in Spain during the term of the 15th Cortes Generales. Results of such polls are displayed in this article. The date range for these opinion polls is from the previous general election, held on 23 July 2023, to the day the next election will be held, on 29 November 2026.

Voting intention estimates refer mainly to a hypothetical Congress of Deputies election. Polls are listed in reverse chronological order, showing the most recent first and using the dates when the survey fieldwork was done, as opposed to the date of publication. Where the fieldwork dates are unknown, the date of publication is given instead. The highest percentage figure in each polling survey is displayed with its background shaded in the leading party's colour. If a tie ensues, this is applied to the figures with the highest percentages. The "Lead" columns on the right shows the percentage-point difference between the parties with the highest percentages in a given poll.

Refusals are generally excluded from the party vote percentages, while question wording and the treatment of "don't know" responses and those not intending to vote may vary between polling organisations. When available, seat projections are displayed below the percentages in a smaller font.

== Autonomous communities ==
=== Andalusia ===
| Polling firm/Commissioner | Fieldwork date | Sample size | Turnout | PP | PSOE | Vox | Sumar | Adelante Andalucía (2021) | Podemos | SALF | FA | Lead |
|---|---|---|---|---|---|---|---|---|---|---|---|---|
| SocioMétrica/El Español | 1 Sep–15 Nov 2026 | ? | ? | ? 24 | ? 18 | ? 15 | (Note: Within FA.) | ? 3 | ? 0 | ? 0 | ? 0 | ? |
| SW Demoscopia/La Séptima | 26 Oct–15 Nov 2026 | ? | ? | ? 19/23 | ? 21/24 | ? 11/14 | | ? 3 | ? 0 | ? 0 | ? 0/2 | ? |
| SW Demoscopia/La Séptima | 26 Oct–14 Nov 2026 | ? | ? | ? 19/22 | ? 21/24 | ? 11/14 | | ? 3 | ? 0 | ? 0 | ? 0/2 | ? |
| Social Data/Grupo Viva | 13 Oct–14 Nov 2026 | 2,000 | ? | 30.5– 34.8; 23/25 | 27.3– 31.5; 20/22 | 16.2– 19.7; 11/12 | | 7.4– 10.0; 3 | 0.7– 1.7; 0 | 1.5– 2.8; 0 | 3.9– 5.9; 0 | 3.2– 3.3 |
| Sondaxe/La Voz de Galicia | 9–13 Nov 2026 | ? | ? | ? 24 | ? 18 | ? 14 | | ? 3 | ? 0 | ? 0 | ? 1 | ? |
| Sigma Dos/El Mundo | 3–13 Nov 2026 | ? | ? | ? 21/24 | ? 17/21 | ? 14/16 | | ? 3/5 | ? 0 | ? 0 | ? 0 | ? |
| SW Demoscopia/La Séptima | 26 Oct–13 Nov 2026 | ? | ? | ? 19/22 | ? 21/24 | ? 11/14 | | ? 3 | ? 0 | ? 0 | ? 0/2 | ? |
| SW Demoscopia/La Séptima | 26 Oct–12 Nov 2026 | ? | ? | ? 19/23 | ? 21/24 | ? 11/14 | | ? 2/3 | ? 0 | ? 0 | ? 0/2 | ? |
| SW Demoscopia/La Séptima | 26 Oct–11 Nov 2026 | ? | ? | ? 19/22 | ? 21/24 | ? 12/14 | | ? 2/3 | ? 0 | ? 0 | ? 0/2 | ? |
| SW Demoscopia/La Séptima | 26 Oct–10 Nov 2026 | ? | ? | ? 20 | ? 22 | ? 14 | | ? 3 | ? 0 | ? 0 | ? 1 | ? |
| SW Demoscopia/La Séptima | 26 Oct–9 Nov 2026 | ? | ? | ? 20 | ? 22 | ? 14 | | ? 3 | ? 0 | ? 0 | ? 1 | ? |
| SW Demoscopia/La Séptima | 26 Oct–8 Nov 2026 | ? | ? | ? 20 | ? 22 | ? 14 | | ? 3 | ? 0 | ? 0 | ? 1 | ? |
| SocioMétrica/El Español | 1 Sep–8 Nov 2026 | ? | ? | ? 24 | ? 18 | ? 15 | | ? 3 | ? 0 | ? 0 | ? 0 | ? |
| SW Demoscopia/La Séptima | 26 Oct–7 Nov 2026 | ? | ? | ? 21 | ? 21 | ? 13 | | ? 3 | ? 0 | ? 0 | ? 2 | Tie |
| SW Demoscopia/La Séptima | 26 Oct–6 Nov 2026 | ? | ? | ? 21 | ? 21 | ? 13 | | ? 3 | ? 0 | ? 0 | ? 2 | Tie |
| GAD3/Vocento | 3–5 Nov 2026 | ? | ? | ? 25 | ? 18 | ? 14 | | ? 3 | ? 0 | ? 0 | ? 0 | ? |
| SW Demoscopia/La Séptima | 26 Oct–5 Nov 2026 | ? | ? | ? 20 | ? 22 | ? 14 | | ? 3 | ? 0 | ? 0 | ? 1 | ? |
| SW Demoscopia/La Séptima | 26 Oct–4 Nov 2026 | ? | ? | ? 21 | ? 21 | ? 14 | | ? 3 | ? 0 | ? 0 | ? 1 | Tie |
| CIS | 7–30 Oct 2026 | 7,609 | ? | ? 18/23 | ? 20/26 | ? 12/16 | | ? 3/5 | ? 0 | ? 0 | ? 0/1 | ? |
| Sigma Dos/El Mundo | 1–8 Oct 2026 | ? | ? | ? 25 | ? 17 | ? 16 | ? 0 | ? 2 | ? 0 | ? 0 | – | ? |
| 2026 regional election | 17 May 2026 | —N/a | 62.3 | 41.6 (33) | 22.8 (15) | 13.8 (9) | 6.3 (1) | 9.6 (3) | (Note: Within PorA.) | 2.5 (0) | – | 18.8 |
| GAD3/Vocento | 30 Apr–7 May 2026 | 1,142 | ? | 37.6; 29 | 29.0; 20 | 18.0; 10 | ? 1 | – | ? 0 | ? 0 | – | 8.6 |
| GAD3/Vocento | 13–16 Apr 2026 | 1,001 | ? | 38.9; 29 | 29.7; 20 | 16.8; 10 | 7.5; 1 | – | ? 0 | ? 0 | – | 9.2 |
| GAD3/Vocento | 24–27 Mar 2026 | 1,002 | ? | 37.7; 27 | 29.9; 21/23 | 17.3; 10 | 7.6; 0/2 | – | 2.3; 0 | 2.4; 0 | – | 7.8 |
| Sigma Dos/El Mundo | 30 Oct–6 Nov 2025 | ? | ? | ? 27 | ? 19 | ? 13 | ? 2 | – | ? 0 | ? 0 | – | ? |
| Sigma Dos/El Mundo | 17 Sep–1 Oct 2025 | ? | ? | ? 27 | ? 19 | ? 13 | ? 2 | – | ? 0 | ? 0 | – | ? |
| Sigma Dos/El Mundo | 20–28 Aug 2025 | ? | ? | ? 27 | ? 19 | ? 13 | ? 2 | – | ? 0 | ? 0 | – | ? |
| Sigma Dos/El Mundo | 21–30 Jul 2025 | ? | ? | ? 28 | ? 19 | ? 12 | ? 2 | – | ? 0 | ? 0 | – | ? |
| Sigma Dos/El Mundo | 20–27 Jun 2025 | ? | ? | ? 28 | ? 20 | ? 11 | ? 2 | – | ? 0 | ? 0 | – | ? |
| Sigma Dos/El Mundo | 21 Apr–28 May 2025 | ? | ? | ? 28 | ? 21 | ? 10 | ? 2 | – | ? 0 | ? 0 | – | ? |
| GAD3/ABC | 3–10 Jun 2025 | 804 | ? | 37.4; 28 | 28.2; 20 | 16.9; 10 | 10.8; 3 | – | 2.0; 0 | – | – | 9.2 |
| Sigma Dos/El Mundo | 4–15 Apr 2025 | ? | ? | ? 27 | ? 21 | ? 11 | ? 2 | – | ? 0 | ? 0 | – | ? |
| Sigma Dos/El Mundo | 24 Feb–7 Mar 2025 | ? | ? | ? 27 | ? 21 | ? 11 | ? 2 | – | ? 0 | ? 0 | – | ? |
| Sigma Dos/El Mundo | 24–31 Jan 2025 | ? | ? | ? 27 | ? 22 | ? 11 | ? 1 | – | ? 0 | ? 0 | – | ? |
| Sigma Dos/El Mundo | 13–26 Dec 2024 | ? | ? | ? 29 | ? 20 | ? 11 | ? 1 | – | ? 0 | ? 0 | – | ? |
| Sigma Dos/El Mundo | 20–27 Sep 2024 | ? | ? | ? 30 | ? 25 | ? 5 | ? 1 | – | ? 0 | ? 0 | – | ? |
| 2024 EP election | 9 Jun 2024 | —N/a | 43.6 | 37.9 (29) | 32.2 (25) | 10.9 (5) | 5.1 (0) | – | 2.8 (0) | 6.2 (2) | – | 5.7 |
| 2023 general election | 23 Jul 2023 | —N/a | 66.6 | 36.4; 25 | 33.5; 21 | 15.3; 9 | 12.0; 6 | 0.2; 0 | (Note: Within Sumar.) | – | – | 2.9 |

=== Aragon ===
| Polling firm/Commissioner | Fieldwork date | Sample size | Turnout | PP | PSOE | Vox | Sumar | Existe | CHA | Podemos | SALF | FA | Lead |
|---|---|---|---|---|---|---|---|---|---|---|---|---|---|
| Social Data/Grupo Viva | 16–19 Nov 2026 | 1,800 | 70.1 | 33.7; 4/5 | 27.7; 4 | 20.7; 3/4 | | 3.2; 0 | | – | – | 9.9; 1 | 6.0 |
| SocioMétrica/El Español | 1 Sep–15 Nov 2026 | ? | ? | ? 5 | ? 4 | ? 3 | | ? 0 | | ? 0 | ? 0 | ? 1 | ? |
| SW Demoscopia/La Séptima | 26 Oct–15 Nov 2026 | ? | ? | ? 4/6 | ? 4/6 | ? 1/4 | | ? 0 | | ? 0 | ? 0 | ? 0 | Tie |
| SW Demoscopia/La Séptima | 26 Oct–14 Nov 2026 | ? | ? | ? 4/6 | ? 4/6 | ? 2/4 | | ? 0 | | ? 0 | ? 0 | ? 0 | Tie |
| Sondaxe/La Voz de Galicia | 9–13 Nov 2026 | ? | ? | ? 5 | ? 4 | ? 4 | | ? 0 | | ? 0 | ? 0 | ? 0 | ? |
| Sigma Dos/El Mundo | 3–13 Nov 2026 | ? | ? | ? 5/6 | ? 4 | ? 2/4 | | ? 0 | | ? 0 | ? 0 | ? 0/1 | ? |
| SW Demoscopia/La Séptima | 26 Oct–13 Nov 2026 | ? | ? | ? 4/6 | ? 4/6 | ? 2/4 | | ? 0 | | ? 0 | ? 0 | ? 0 | Tie |
| SW Demoscopia/La Séptima | 26 Oct–12 Nov 2026 | ? | ? | ? 4/6 | ? 4/6 | ? 2/4 | | ? 0 | | ? 0 | ? 0 | ? 0 | Tie |
| SW Demoscopia/La Séptima | 26 Oct–11 Nov 2026 | ? | ? | ? 4/6 | ? 4/6 | ? 2/4 | | ? 0 | | ? 0 | ? 0 | ? 0 | Tie |
| CIS | 7–30 Oct 2026 | 1,884 | ? | ? 4/5 | ? 4/7 | ? 1/3 | | ? 0 | | ? 0 | ? 0 | ? 1 | ? |
| SocioMétrica/El Español | 1 Sep–8 Nov 2026 | ? | ? | ? 6 | ? 4 | ? 2 | | ? 0 | | ? 0 | ? 0 | ? 1 | ? |
| GAD3/Vocento | 3–5 Nov 2026 | ? | ? | ? 6 | ? 4 | ? 3 | | ? 0 | | ? 0 | ? 0 | ? 0 | ? |
| Sigma Dos/El Mundo | 1–8 Oct 2026 | ? | ? | ? 7 | ? 3 | ? 2 | ? 1 | ? 0 | | ? 0 | ? 0 | – | ? |
| A+M/Heraldo de Aragón | 1–6 Oct 2026 | 2,200 | 70.9 | 34.5; 6 | 29.7; 4/5 | 17.5; 2 | 5.4; 0 | 3.3; 0 | 6.6; 0/1 | – | – | – | 4.7 |
| 2026 regional election | 8 Feb 2026 | —N/a | 65.1 | 34.2 (5) | 24.4 (4) | 17.8 (3) | 3.0 (0) | 3.5 (0) | 9.7 (1) | 1.0 (0) | 2.7 (0) | – | 9.8 |
| Sigma Dos/El Mundo | 30 Oct–6 Nov 2025 | ? | ? | ? 7 | ? 4 | ? 2 | ? 0 | ? 0 | | ? 0 | ? 0 | – | ? |
| Sigma Dos/El Mundo | 17 Sep–1 Oct 2025 | ? | ? | ? 8 | ? 4 | ? 1 | ? 0 | ? 0 | | ? 0 | ? 0 | – | ? |
| Sigma Dos/El Mundo | 20–28 Aug 2025 | ? | ? | ? 8 | ? 4 | ? 1 | ? 0 | ? 0 | | ? 0 | ? 0 | – | ? |
| Sigma Dos/El Mundo | 21–30 Jul 2025 | ? | ? | ? 8 | ? 4 | ? 1 | ? 0 | ? 0 | | ? 0 | ? 0 | – | ? |
| Sigma Dos/El Mundo | 20–27 Jun 2025 | ? | ? | ? 8 | ? 4 | ? 1 | ? 0 | ? 0 | | ? 0 | ? 0 | – | ? |
| Sigma Dos/El Mundo | 21 Apr–28 May 2025 | ? | ? | ? 8 | ? 4 | ? 1 | ? 0 | ? 0 | | ? 0 | ? 0 | – | ? |
| Sigma Dos/El Mundo | 4–15 Apr 2025 | ? | ? | ? 8 | ? 4 | ? 1 | ? 0 | ? 0 | | ? 0 | ? 0 | – | ? |
| Sigma Dos/El Mundo | 24 Feb–7 Mar 2025 | ? | ? | ? 8 | ? 4 | ? 1 | ? 0 | ? 0 | | ? 0 | ? 0 | – | ? |
| Sigma Dos/El Mundo | 24–31 Jan 2025 | ? | ? | ? 8 | ? 4 | ? 1 | ? 0 | ? 0 | | ? 0 | ? 0 | – | ? |
| Sigma Dos/El Mundo | 13–26 Dec 2024 | ? | ? | ? 8 | ? 4 | ? 1 | ? 0 | ? 0 | | ? 0 | ? 0 | – | ? |
| Sigma Dos/El Mundo | 20–27 Sep 2024 | ? | ? | ? 8 | ? 4 | ? 1 | ? 0 | ? 0 | | ? 0 | ? 0 | – | ? |
| 2024 EP election | 9 Jun 2024 | —N/a | 51.1 | 37.1 (7) | 30.3 (5) | 11.5 (1) | 5.1 (0) | 2.9 (0) | | 3.1 (0) | 5.1 (0) | – | 6.8 |
| 2023 general election | 23 Jul 2023 | —N/a | 70.7 | 36.3; 7 | 31.1; 4 | 14.6; 1 | 12.3; 1 | 2.9; 0 | | | – | – | 5.2 |

=== Asturias ===
| Polling firm/Commissioner | Fieldwork date | Sample size | Turnout | PP | PSOE | Sumar | Vox | Podemos | SALF | FA | Lead |
|---|---|---|---|---|---|---|---|---|---|---|---|
| SocioMétrica/El Español | 1 Sep–15 Nov 2026 | ? | ? | ? 3 | ? 3 | | ? 1 | ? 0 | ? 0 | ? 0 | ? |
| SW Demoscopia/La Séptima | 26 Oct–15 Nov 2026 | ? | ? | ? 2/3 | ? 3 | | ? 1 | ? 0 | ? 0 | ? 0/1 | ? |
| SW Demoscopia/La Séptima | 26 Oct–14 Nov 2026 | ? | ? | ? 2/3 | ? 3 | | ? 1 | ? 0 | ? 0 | ? 0/1 | ? |
| Sondaxe/La Voz de Galicia | 9–13 Nov 2026 | ? | ? | ? 3 | ? 3 | | ? 1 | ? 0 | ? 0 | ? 0 | Tie |
| Sigma Dos/El Mundo | 3–13 Nov 2026 | ? | ? | ? 3 | ? 2 | | ? 1/2 | ? 0 | ? 0 | ? 0/1 | ? |
| SW Demoscopia/La Séptima | 26 Oct–13 Nov 2026 | ? | ? | ? 2/3 | ? 3 | | ? 1 | ? 0 | ? 0 | ? 0/1 | ? |
| SW Demoscopia/La Séptima | 26 Oct–12 Nov 2026 | ? | ? | ? 2/3 | ? 3 | | ? 1 | ? 0 | ? 0 | ? 0/1 | ? |
| SW Demoscopia/La Séptima | 26 Oct–11 Nov 2026 | ? | ? | ? 2/3 | ? 3 | | ? 1 | ? 0 | ? 0 | ? 0/1 | ? |
| CIS | 7–30 Oct 2026 | 999 | ? | ? 2/3 | ? 3/4 | | ? 1 | ? 0 | ? 0 | ? 0 | ? |
| SocioMétrica/El Español | 1 Sep–8 Nov 2026 | ? | ? | ? 3 | ? 2 | | ? 2 | ? 0 | ? 0 | ? 0 | ? |
| GAD3/Vocento | 3–5 Nov 2026 | ? | ? | ? 3 | ? 2 | | ? 2 | ? 0 | ? 0 | ? 0 | ? |
| Sigma Dos/El Mundo | 1–8 Oct 2026 | ? | ? | ? 3 | ? 3 | ? 0 | ? 1 | ? 0 | ? 0 | – | Tie |
| Sigma Dos/El Mundo | 30 Oct–6 Nov 2025 | ? | ? | ? 3 | ? 3 | ? 0 | ? 1 | ? 0 | ? 0 | – | Tie |
| Sigma Dos/El Mundo | 17 Sep–1 Oct 2025 | ? | ? | ? 3 | ? 3 | ? 0 | ? 1 | ? 0 | ? 0 | – | Tie |
| Sigma Dos/El Mundo | 20–28 Aug 2025 | ? | ? | ? 3 | ? 3 | ? 0 | ? 1 | ? 0 | ? 0 | – | Tie |
| Sigma Dos/El Mundo | 21–30 Jul 2025 | ? | ? | ? 3 | ? 3 | ? 0 | ? 1 | ? 0 | ? 0 | – | Tie |
| Sigma Dos/El Mundo | 20–27 Jun 2025 | ? | ? | ? 3 | ? 3 | ? 0 | ? 1 | ? 0 | ? 0 | – | Tie |
| Sigma Dos/El Mundo | 21 Apr–28 May 2025 | ? | ? | ? 3 | ? 3 | ? 0 | ? 1 | ? 0 | ? 0 | – | Tie |
| Sigma Dos/El Mundo | 4–15 Apr 2025 | ? | ? | ? 3 | ? 3 | ? 0 | ? 1 | ? 0 | ? 0 | – | Tie |
| Sigma Dos/El Mundo | 24 Feb–7 Mar 2025 | ? | ? | ? 3 | ? 3 | ? 0 | ? 1 | ? 0 | ? 0 | – | Tie |
| Sigma Dos/El Mundo | 24–31 Jan 2025 | ? | ? | ? 3 | ? 3 | ? 0 | ? 1 | ? 0 | ? 0 | – | Tie |
| Sigma Dos/El Mundo | 13–26 Dec 2024 | ? | ? | ? 3 | ? 3 | ? 0 | ? 1 | ? 0 | ? 0 | – | Tie |
| Sigma Dos/El Mundo | 20–27 Sep 2024 | ? | ? | ? 3 | ? 3 | ? 0 | ? 1 | ? 0 | ? 0 | – | Tie |
| 2024 EP election | 9 Jun 2024 | —N/a | 44.7 | 36.9 (3) | 35.1 (3) | 5.9 (0) | 10.0 (1) | 3.8 (0) | 3.3 (0) | – | 1.8 |
| 2023 general election | 23 Jul 2023 | —N/a | 62.9 | 35.6; 3 | 34.3; 2 | 14.8; 1 | 12.5; 1 | | – | – | 1.3 |

=== Balearic Islands ===
| Polling firm/Commissioner | Fieldwork date | Sample size | Turnout | PP | PSOE | Sumar | Vox | Podemos | Ara Més | SALF | Lead |
|---|---|---|---|---|---|---|---|---|---|---|---|
| SocioMétrica/El Español | 1 Sep–15 Nov 2026 | ? | ? | ? 3 | ? 3 | (Note: Within Ara Més.) | ? 2 | ? 0 | ? 0 | ? 0 | Tie |
| SW Demoscopia/La Séptima | 26 Oct–15 Nov 2026 | ? | ? | ? 2/3 | ? 2/3 | | ? 1/2 | ? 0 | ? 0/1 | ? 0 | Tie |
| SW Demoscopia/La Séptima | 26 Oct–14 Nov 2026 | ? | ? | ? 2/3 | ? 2/3 | | ? 1/2 | ? 0 | ? 0/1 | ? 0 | Tie |
| Sondaxe/La Voz de Galicia | 9–13 Nov 2026 | ? | ? | ? 3 | ? 2 | | ? 2 | ? 0 | ? 1 | ? 0 | ? |
| Sigma Dos/El Mundo | 3–13 Nov 2026 | ? | ? | ? 3 | ? 2 | | ? 2 | ? 0 | ? 1 | ? 0 | ? |
| SW Demoscopia/La Séptima | 26 Oct–13 Nov 2026 | ? | ? | ? 2/3 | ? 2/3 | | ? 1/2 | ? 0 | ? 0/1 | ? 0 | Tie |
| SW Demoscopia/La Séptima | 26 Oct–12 Nov 2026 | ? | ? | ? 2/3 | ? 2/3 | | ? 1/2 | ? 0 | ? 0/1 | ? 0 | Tie |
| SW Demoscopia/La Séptima | 26 Oct–11 Nov 2026 | ? | ? | ? 2/3 | ? 2/3 | | ? 1/2 | ? 0 | ? 0/1 | ? 0 | Tie |
| CIS | 7–30 Oct 2026 | 981 | ? | ? 2/3 | ? 3/4 | | ? 1/2 | ? 0 | ? 0/1 | ? 0 | ? |
| SocioMétrica/El Español | 1 Sep–8 Nov 2026 | ? | ? | ? 4 | ? 2 | | ? 2 | ? 0 | ? 0 | ? 0 | ? |
| GAD3/Vocento | 3–5 Nov 2026 | ? | ? | ? 3 | ? 2 | | ? 2 | ? 0 | ? 1 | ? 0 | ? |
| Sigma Dos/El Mundo | 1–8 Oct 2026 | ? | ? | ? 3 | ? 2 | ? 1 | ? 2 | ? 0 | | ? 0 | ? |
| Sigma Dos/El Mundo | 30 Oct–6 Nov 2025 | ? | ? | ? 3 | ? 2 | ? 1 | ? 2 | ? 0 | | ? 0 | ? |
| Sigma Dos/El Mundo | 17 Sep–1 Oct 2025 | ? | ? | ? 3 | ? 2 | ? 1 | ? 2 | ? 0 | | ? 0 | ? |
| Sigma Dos/El Mundo | 20–28 Aug 2025 | ? | ? | ? 4 | ? 2 | ? 1 | ? 1 | ? 0 | | ? 0 | ? |
| Sigma Dos/El Mundo | 21–30 Jul 2025 | ? | ? | ? 4 | ? 2 | ? 1 | ? 1 | ? 0 | | ? 0 | ? |
| Sigma Dos/El Mundo | 20–27 Jun 2025 | ? | ? | ? 4 | ? 2 | ? 1 | ? 1 | ? 0 | | ? 0 | ? |
| Sigma Dos/El Mundo | 21 Apr–28 May 2025 | ? | ? | ? 4 | ? 2 | ? 1 | ? 1 | ? 0 | | ? 0 | ? |
| Sigma Dos/El Mundo | 4–15 Apr 2025 | ? | ? | ? 4 | ? 2 | ? 1 | ? 1 | ? 0 | | ? 0 | ? |
| Sigma Dos/El Mundo | 24 Feb–7 Mar 2025 | ? | ? | ? 4 | ? 2 | ? 1 | ? 1 | ? 0 | | ? 0 | ? |
| Sigma Dos/El Mundo | 24–31 Jan 2025 | ? | ? | ? 4 | ? 3 | ? 0 | ? 1 | ? 0 | | ? 0 | ? |
| Sigma Dos/El Mundo | 13–26 Dec 2024 | ? | ? | ? 4 | ? 2 | ? 1 | ? 1 | ? 0 | | ? 0 | ? |
| Sigma Dos/El Mundo | 20–27 Sep 2024 | ? | ? | ? 4 | ? 2 | ? 1 | ? 1 | ? 0 | | ? 0 | ? |
| 2024 EP election | 9 Jun 2024 | —N/a | 37.7 | 35.8 (4) | 28.9 (3) | 4.4 (0) | 11.2 (1) | 3.1 (0) | 5.2 (0) | 5.3 (0) | 6.9 |
| 2023 general election | 23 Jul 2023 | —N/a | 61.3 | 35.6; 3 | 30.2; 3 | 16.6; 1 | 15.2; 1 | | | – | 5.4 |

=== Basque Country ===
| Polling firm/Commissioner | Fieldwork date | Sample size | Turnout | PSE–EE (PSOE) | PNV | EH Bildu | PP | Sumar | Vox | Podemos | FA | Lead |
|---|---|---|---|---|---|---|---|---|---|---|---|---|
| SocioMétrica/El Español | 1 Sep–15 Nov 2026 | ? | ? | ? 5 | ? 4 | ? 7 | ? 2 | | ? 0 | ? 0 | ? 0 | ? |
| SW Demoscopia/La Séptima | 26 Oct–15 Nov 2026 | ? | ? | ? 7/8 | ? 3 | ? 5/6 | ? 2 | | ? 0 | ? 0 | ? 0 | ? |
| SW Demoscopia/La Séptima | 26 Oct–14 Nov 2026 | ? | ? | ? 7 | ? 3 | ? 6 | ? 2 | | ? 0 | ? 0 | ? 0 | ? |
| Sondaxe/La Voz de Galicia | 9–13 Nov 2026 | ? | ? | ? 4 | ? 5 | ? 7 | ? 2 | | ? 0 | ? 0 | ? 0 | ? |
| Sigma Dos/El Mundo | 3–13 Nov 2026 | ? | ? | ? 6/7 | ? 3/4 | ? 5/7 | ? 2 | | ? 0 | ? 0 | ? 0 | ? |
| SW Demoscopia/La Séptima | 26 Oct–13 Nov 2026 | ? | ? | ? 7/8 | ? 2/3 | ? 6 | ? 2 | | ? 0 | ? 0 | ? 0 | ? |
| SW Demoscopia/La Séptima | 26 Oct–12 Nov 2026 | ? | ? | ? 7/8 | ? 3 | ? 5/6 | ? 2 | | ? 0 | ? 0 | ? 0 | ? |
| SW Demoscopia/La Séptima | 26 Oct–11 Nov 2026 | ? | ? | ? 7 | ? 3 | ? 6 | ? 2 | | ? 0 | ? 0 | ? 0 | ? |
| SW Demoscopia/La Séptima | 26 Oct–10 Nov 2026 | ? | ? | ? 7 | ? 3 | ? 6 | ? 2 | | ? 0 | ? 0 | ? 0 | ? |
| SW Demoscopia/La Séptima | 26 Oct–9 Nov 2026 | ? | ? | ? 7 | ? 3 | ? 6 | ? 2 | | ? 0 | ? 0 | ? 0 | ? |
| SW Demoscopia/La Séptima | 26 Oct–8 Nov 2026 | ? | ? | ? 7 | ? 3 | ? 6 | ? 2 | | ? 0 | ? 0 | ? 0 | ? |
| SocioMétrica/El Español | 1 Sep–8 Nov 2026 | ? | ? | ? 6 | ? 3 | ? 7 | ? 2 | | ? 0 | ? 0 | ? 0 | ? |
| SW Demoscopia/La Séptima | 26 Oct–7 Nov 2026 | ? | ? | ? 7 | ? 3 | ? 6 | ? 2 | | ? 0 | ? 0 | ? 0 | ? |
| SW Demoscopia/La Séptima | 26 Oct–6 Nov 2026 | ? | ? | ? 7 | ? 3 | ? 6 | ? 2 | | ? 0 | ? 0 | ? 0 | ? |
| GAD3/Vocento | 3–5 Nov 2026 | ? | ? | ? 5 | ? 4 | ? 7 | ? 2 | | ? 0 | ? 0 | ? 0 | ? |
| SW Demoscopia/La Séptima | 26 Oct–5 Nov 2026 | ? | ? | ? 7 | ? 3 | ? 6 | ? 2 | | ? 0 | ? 0 | ? 0 | ? |
| SW Demoscopia/La Séptima | 26 Oct–4 Nov 2026 | ? | ? | ? 7 | ? 3 | ? 6 | ? 2 | | ? 0 | ? 0 | ? 0 | ? |
| EM-Analytics/Electomanía | 28–30 Oct 2026 | ? | ? | 23.4; 4 | 23.0; 6 | 27.6; 6 | 11.6; 2 | | 4.9; 0 | 1.9; 0 | 7.1; 0 | 4.2 |
| CIS | 7–30 Oct 2026 | 2,244 | ? | ? 6/8 | ? 2/4 | ? 6/8 | ? 0/2 | | ? 0/1 | ? 0 | ? 0 | Tie |
| Ikerfel/GPS | 20–23 Oct 2026 | 3,485 | 68.7 | 24.7; 5 | 21.9; 4 | 29.1; 7 | 12.6; 2 | | 4.8; 0 | – | 4.0; 0 | 4.4 |
| Sigma Dos/El Mundo | 1–8 Oct 2026 | ? | ? | ? 6 | ? 5 | ? 5 | ? 2 | ? 0 | ? 0 | – | – | ? |
| Sigma Dos/El Mundo | 30 Oct–6 Nov 2025 | ? | ? | ? 5 | ? 6 | ? 5 | ? 2 | ? 0 | ? 0 | – | – | ? |
| Sigma Dos/El Mundo | 17 Sep–1 Oct 2025 | ? | ? | ? 5 | ? 6 | ? 5 | ? 2 | ? 0 | ? 0 | – | – | ? |
| Gizaker/EiTB | 15–23 Sep 2025 | 1,200 | ? | 22.3; 4 | 24.3; 6 | 27.1; 6 | 10.1; 2 | 8.2; 0 | 4.9; 0 | – | – | 2.8 |
| Sigma Dos/El Mundo | 20–28 Aug 2025 | ? | ? | ? 5 | ? 6 | ? 5 | ? 2 | ? 0 | ? 0 | – | – | ? |
| Sigma Dos/El Mundo | 21–30 Jul 2025 | ? | ? | ? 5 | ? 6 | ? 5 | ? 2 | ? 0 | ? 0 | – | – | ? |
| Sigma Dos/El Mundo | 20–27 Jun 2025 | ? | ? | ? 5 | ? 6 | ? 5 | ? 2 | ? 0 | ? 0 | – | – | ? |
| Sigma Dos/El Mundo | 21 Apr–28 May 2025 | ? | ? | ? 5 | ? 6 | ? 5 | ? 2 | ? 0 | ? 0 | – | – | ? |
| Sigma Dos/El Mundo | 4–15 Apr 2025 | ? | ? | ? 5 | ? 6 | ? 5 | ? 2 | ? 0 | ? 0 | – | – | ? |
| Sigma Dos/El Mundo | 24 Feb–7 Mar 2025 | ? | ? | ? 6 | ? 6 | ? 4 | ? 2 | ? 0 | ? 0 | – | – | Tie |
| Sigma Dos/El Mundo | 24–31 Jan 2025 | ? | ? | ? 6 | ? 6 | ? 4 | ? 2 | ? 0 | ? 0 | – | – | Tie |
| Sigma Dos/El Mundo | 13–26 Dec 2024 | ? | ? | ? 5 | ? 6 | ? 5 | ? 2 | ? 0 | ? 0 | – | – | ? |
| Sigma Dos/El Mundo | 20–27 Sep 2024 | ? | ? | ? 5 | ? 6 | ? 5 | ? 2 | ? 0 | ? 0 | – | – | ? |
| 2024 EP election | 9 Jun 2024 | —N/a | 48.8 | 26.0 (6) | 22.4 (4) | 26.3 (6) | 11.6 (2) | 3.3 (0) | 2.7 (0) | 3.2 (0) | – | 0.3 |
| 2024 regional election | 21 Apr 2024 | —N/a | 60.0 | 14.1 (3) | 34.8 (7) | 32.1 (7) | 9.2 (1) | 3.3 (0) | 2.0 (0) | 2.2 (0) | – | 2.7 |
| Sigma Dos/El Mundo | 13–15 Sep 2023 | 800 | ? | 25.1; 5 | 23.1; 5 | 24.2; 5 | 12.3; 2 | 11.2; 1 | 2.9; 0 | – | – | 0.9 |
| 2023 general election | 23 Jul 2023 | —N/a | 65.1 | 25.3; 5 | 24.0; 5 | 23.9; 5 | 11.6; 2 | 11.1; 1 | 2.6; 0 | | – | 1.3 |

=== Canary Islands ===
| Polling firm/Commissioner | Fieldwork date | Sample size | Turnout | PSOE | PP | CCa | Sumar | Vox | NCa | Podemos | SALF | UPC | Lead |
|---|---|---|---|---|---|---|---|---|---|---|---|---|---|
| Ágora Integral/Canarias Ahora | 16–20 Nov 2026 | 1,616 | 62.5 | 32.8; 5/6 | 27.1; 4/5 | 9.3; 0/1 | (Note: Within UPC.) | 19.4; 3 | | | – | 10.5; 1 | 5.7 |
| SocioMétrica/El Español | 1 Sep–15 Nov 2026 | ? | ? | ? 5 | ? 6 | ? 1 | | ? 3 | | | ? 0 | ? 0 | ? |
| SW Demoscopia/La Séptima | 26 Oct–15 Nov 2026 | ? | ? | ? 5/6 | ? 4/5 | ? 1 | | ? 2/3 | | | ? 0 | ? 1 | ? |
| SW Demoscopia/La Séptima | 26 Oct–14 Nov 2026 | ? | ? | ? 5/6 | ? 4/5 | ? 1 | | ? 3 | | | ? 0 | ? 1 | ? |
| Sondaxe/La Voz de Galicia | 9–13 Nov 2026 | ? | ? | ? 5 | ? 5 | ? 1 | | ? 3 | | | ? 0 | ? 1 | Tie |
| Sigma Dos/El Mundo | 3–13 Nov 2026 | ? | ? | ? 4/5 | ? 4/6 | ? 0/1 | | ? 4 | | | ? 0 | ? 1 | ? |
| SW Demoscopia/La Séptima | 26 Oct–13 Nov 2026 | ? | ? | ? 5/6 | ? 4/5 | ? 1 | | ? 3 | | | ? 0 | ? 1 | ? |
| SW Demoscopia/La Séptima | 26 Oct–12 Nov 2026 | ? | ? | ? 5/6 | ? 4/5 | ? 1 | | ? 3 | | | ? 0 | ? 1 | ? |
| GCEMOP/Atlántico Hoy | 28 Oct–11 Nov 2026 | 1,500 | ? | 25.0– 26.0; 4/6 | 21.0– 22.0; 4 | 12.0– 13.0; 1/2 | | 17.0– 18.0; 2/4 | | | – | 10.0– 11.0; 1/2 | 4.0 |
| SW Demoscopia/La Séptima | 26 Oct–11 Nov 2026 | ? | ? | ? 5/6 | ? 4/5 | ? 1 | | ? 3 | | | ? 0 | ? 1 | ? |
| SW Demoscopia/La Séptima | 26 Oct–10 Nov 2026 | ? | ? | ? 6 | ? 4 | ? 1 | | ? 3 | | | ? 0 | ? 1 | ? |
| SW Demoscopia/La Séptima | 26 Oct–9 Nov 2026 | ? | ? | ? 6 | ? 4 | ? 1 | | ? 3 | | | ? 0 | ? 1 | ? |
| SW Demoscopia/La Séptima | 26 Oct–8 Nov 2026 | ? | ? | ? 6 | ? 4 | ? 1 | | ? 3 | | | ? 0 | ? 1 | ? |
| SocioMétrica/El Español | 1 Sep–8 Nov 2026 | ? | ? | ? 5 | ? 6 | ? 1 | | ? 3 | | | ? 0 | ? 0 | ? |
| SW Demoscopia/La Séptima | 26 Oct–7 Nov 2026 | ? | ? | ? 7 | ? 4 | ? 1 | | ? 3 | | | ? 0 | ? 0 | ? |
| SW Demoscopia/La Séptima | 26 Oct–6 Nov 2026 | ? | ? | ? 7 | ? 4 | ? 1 | | ? 3 | | | ? 0 | ? 0 | ? |
| GAD3/Vocento | 3–5 Nov 2026 | ? | ? | ? 6 | ? 5 | ? 1 | | ? 3 | | | ? 0 | ? 0 | ? |
| SW Demoscopia/La Séptima | 26 Oct–5 Nov 2026 | ? | ? | ? 6 | ? 4 | ? 1 | | ? 3 | | | ? 0 | ? 1 | ? |
| SW Demoscopia/La Séptima | 26 Oct–4 Nov 2026 | ? | ? | ? 6 | ? 4 | ? 1 | | ? 3 | | | ? 0 | ? 1 | ? |
| CIS | 7–30 Oct 2026 | 2,010 | ? | ? 6/8 | ? 3/4 | ? 0 | | ? 3/4 | | | ? 0 | ? 0/1 | ? |
| Sigma Dos/El Mundo | 1–8 Oct 2026 | ? | ? | ? 6 | ? 6 | ? 1 | ? 0 | ? 2 | – | ? 0 | ? 0 | – | Tie |
| EM-Analytics/Electomanía | 4 Feb 2026 | ? | ? | 30.0; 6 | 24.0; 5 | 11.0; 1 | 5.0; 0 | 21.0; 3 | 4.0; 0 | 3.0; 0 | – | – | 6.0 |
| Sigma Dos/El Mundo | 30 Oct–6 Nov 2025 | ? | ? | ? 6 | ? 6 | ? 1 | ? 0 | ? 2 | – | ? 0 | ? 0 | – | Tie |
| Sigma Dos/El Mundo | 17 Sep–1 Oct 2025 | ? | ? | ? 6 | ? 6 | ? 1 | ? 0 | ? 2 | – | ? 0 | ? 0 | – | Tie |
| Sigma Dos/El Mundo | 20–28 Aug 2025 | ? | ? | ? 6 | ? 6 | ? 1 | ? 0 | ? 2 | – | ? 0 | ? 0 | – | Tie |
| Sigma Dos/El Mundo | 21–30 Jul 2025 | ? | ? | ? 5 | ? 7 | ? 1 | ? 0 | ? 2 | – | ? 0 | ? 0 | – | ? |
| Sigma Dos/El Mundo | 20–27 Jun 2025 | ? | ? | ? 6 | ? 6 | ? 1 | ? 0 | ? 2 | – | ? 0 | ? 0 | – | Tie |
| Sigma Dos/El Mundo | 21 Apr–28 May 2025 | ? | ? | ? 6 | ? 6 | ? 1 | ? 0 | ? 2 | – | ? 0 | ? 0 | – | Tie |
| Sigma Dos/El Mundo | 4–15 Apr 2025 | ? | ? | ? 6 | ? 6 | ? 1 | ? 0 | ? 2 | – | ? 0 | ? 0 | – | Tie |
| Sigma Dos/El Mundo | 24 Feb–7 Mar 2025 | ? | ? | ? 6 | ? 6 | ? 1 | ? 0 | ? 2 | – | ? 0 | ? 0 | – | Tie |
| Sigma Dos/El Mundo | 24–31 Jan 2025 | ? | ? | ? 6 | ? 6 | ? 1 | ? 0 | ? 2 | – | ? 0 | ? 0 | – | Tie |
| Sigma Dos/El Mundo | 13–26 Dec 2024 | ? | ? | ? 6 | ? 6 | ? 1 | ? 0 | ? 2 | – | ? 0 | ? 0 | – | Tie |
| Sigma Dos/El Mundo | 20–27 Sep 2024 | ? | ? | ? 6 | ? 6 | ? 1 | ? 1 | ? 1 | – | ? 0 | ? 0 | – | Tie |
| 2024 EP election | 9 Jun 2024 | —N/a | 37.2 | 30.5 (7) | 29.3 (5) | 10.3 (1) | 4.0 (0) | 12.0 (2) | – | 3.4 (0) | 6.3 (0) | – | 1.2 |
| 2023 general election | 23 Jul 2023 | —N/a | 58.2 | 33.3; 6 | 30.4; 6 | 11.4; 1 | 10.5; 1 | 7.6; 1 | 4.5; 0 | | – | – | 2.9 |

=== Cantabria ===
| Polling firm/Commissioner | Fieldwork date | Sample size | Turnout | PP | PSOE | Vox | Sumar | Podemos | SALF | FA | Lead |
|---|---|---|---|---|---|---|---|---|---|---|---|
| SocioMétrica/El Español | 1 Sep–15 Nov 2026 | ? | ? | ? 2 | ? 2 | ? 1 | | ? 0 | ? 0 | ? 0 | Tie |
| SW Demoscopia/La Séptima | 26 Oct–15 Nov 2026 | ? | ? | ? 2 | ? 2 | ? 1 | | ? 0 | ? 0 | ? 0 | Tie |
| SW Demoscopia/La Séptima | 26 Oct–14 Nov 2026 | ? | ? | ? 2 | ? 2 | ? 1 | | ? 0 | ? 0 | ? 0 | Tie |
| Sondaxe/La Voz de Galicia | 9–13 Nov 2026 | ? | ? | ? 2 | ? 2 | ? 1 | | ? 0 | ? 0 | ? 0 | Tie |
| Sigma Dos/El Mundo | 3–13 Nov 2026 | ? | ? | ? 2 | ? 2 | ? 1 | | ? 0 | ? 0 | ? 0 | Tie |
| SW Demoscopia/La Séptima | 26 Oct–13 Nov 2026 | ? | ? | ? 2 | ? 2 | ? 1 | | ? 0 | ? 0 | ? 0 | Tie |
| SW Demoscopia/La Séptima | 26 Oct–12 Nov 2026 | ? | ? | ? 2 | ? 2 | ? 1 | | ? 0 | ? 0 | ? 0 | Tie |
| SW Demoscopia/La Séptima | 26 Oct–11 Nov 2026 | ? | ? | ? 2 | ? 2 | ? 1 | | ? 0 | ? 0 | ? 0 | Tie |
| SocioMétrica/El Español | 1 Sep–8 Nov 2026 | ? | ? | ? 2 | ? 2 | ? 1 | | ? 0 | ? 0 | ? 0 | Tie |
| GAD3/Vocento | 3–5 Nov 2026 | ? | ? | ? 2 | ? 2 | ? 1 | | ? 0 | ? 0 | ? 0 | Tie |
| CIS | 7–30 Oct 2026 | 675 | ? | ? 2 | ? 2 | ? 1 | | ? 0 | ? 0 | ? 0 | Tie |
| Sigma Dos/El Mundo | 1–8 Oct 2026 | ? | ? | ? 2 | ? 2 | ? 1 | ? 0 | ? 0 | ? 0 | – | Tie |
| Sigma Dos/El Mundo | 30 Oct–6 Nov 2025 | ? | ? | ? 2 | ? 2 | ? 1 | ? 0 | ? 0 | ? 0 | – | Tie |
| Sigma Dos/El Mundo | 17 Sep–1 Oct 2025 | ? | ? | ? 3 | ? 1 | ? 1 | ? 0 | ? 0 | ? 0 | – | ? |
| Sigma Dos/El Mundo | 20–28 Aug 2025 | ? | ? | ? 3 | ? 1 | ? 1 | ? 0 | ? 0 | ? 0 | – | ? |
| Sigma Dos/El Mundo | 21–30 Jul 2025 | ? | ? | ? 3 | ? 1 | ? 1 | ? 0 | ? 0 | ? 0 | – | ? |
| Sigma Dos/El Mundo | 20–27 Jun 2025 | ? | ? | ? 3 | ? 1 | ? 1 | ? 0 | ? 0 | ? 0 | – | ? |
| Sigma Dos/El Mundo | 21 Apr–28 May 2025 | ? | ? | ? 2 | ? 2 | ? 1 | ? 0 | ? 0 | ? 0 | – | Tie |
| Sigma Dos/El Mundo | 4–15 Apr 2025 | ? | ? | ? 3 | ? 2 | ? 0 | ? 0 | ? 0 | ? 0 | – | ? |
| Sigma Dos/El Mundo | 24 Feb–7 Mar 2025 | ? | ? | ? 2 | ? 2 | ? 1 | ? 0 | ? 0 | ? 0 | – | Tie |
| Sigma Dos/El Mundo | 24–31 Jan 2025 | ? | ? | ? 2 | ? 2 | ? 1 | ? 0 | ? 0 | ? 0 | – | Tie |
| Sigma Dos/El Mundo | 13–26 Dec 2024 | ? | ? | ? 3 | ? 2 | ? 0 | ? 0 | ? 0 | ? 0 | – | ? |
| Sigma Dos/El Mundo | 20–27 Sep 2024 | ? | ? | ? 3 | ? 2 | ? 0 | ? 0 | ? 0 | ? 0 | – | ? |
| 2024 EP election | 9 Jun 2024 | —N/a | 50.7 | 42.8 (3) | 31.0 (2) | 9.9 (0) | 3.2 (0) | 2.7 (0) | 5.7 (0) | – | 11.8 |
| 2023 general election | 23 Jul 2023 | —N/a | 69.9 | 42.1; 2 | 33.3; 2 | 14.1; 1 | 8.5; 0 | | – | – | 8.8 |

=== Castile and León ===
| Polling firm/Commissioner | Fieldwork date | Sample size | Turnout | PP | PSOE | Vox | Sumar | UPL | SY | Podemos | SALF | FA | Lead |
|---|---|---|---|---|---|---|---|---|---|---|---|---|---|
| SocioMétrica/El Español | 1 Sep–15 Nov 2026 | ? | ? | ? 16 | ? 10 | ? 5 | | – | – | | ? 0 | ? 0 | ? |
| SW Demoscopia/La Séptima | 26 Oct–15 Nov 2026 | ? | ? | ? 12/16 | ? 11/13 | ? 3/7 | | – | – | | ? 0 | ? 0 | ? |
| SW Demoscopia/La Séptima | 26 Oct–14 Nov 2026 | ? | ? | ? 12/16 | ? 11/13 | ? 4/7 | | – | – | | ? 0 | ? 0 | ? |
| Sondaxe/La Voz de Galicia | 9–13 Nov 2026 | ? | ? | ? 16 | ? 10 | ? 5 | | – | – | | ? 0 | ? 0 | ? |
| Sigma Dos/El Mundo | 3–13 Nov 2026 | ? | ? | ? 13/16 | ? 9/11 | ? 5/7 | | – | ? 0/1 | | ? 0 | ? 0 | ? |
| SW Demoscopia/La Séptima | 26 Oct–13 Nov 2026 | ? | ? | ? 12/15 | ? 11/13 | ? 4/7 | | – | – | | ? 0 | ? 0 | ? |
| SW Demoscopia/La Séptima | 26 Oct–12 Nov 2026 | ? | ? | ? 12/16 | ? 11/13 | ? 4/7 | | – | – | | ? 0 | ? 0 | ? |
| SW Demoscopia/La Séptima | 26 Oct–11 Nov 2026 | ? | ? | ? 12/15 | ? 11/13 | ? 4/7 | | – | – | | ? 0 | ? 0 | ? |
| SW Demoscopia/La Séptima | 26 Oct–10 Nov 2026 | ? | ? | ? 13 | ? 11 | ? 7 | | – | – | | ? 0 | ? 0 | ? |
| SW Demoscopia/La Séptima | 26 Oct–9 Nov 2026 | ? | ? | ? 13 | ? 11 | ? 7 | | – | – | | ? 0 | ? 0 | ? |
| SW Demoscopia/La Séptima | 26 Oct–8 Nov 2026 | ? | ? | ? 14 | ? 11 | ? 6 | | – | – | | ? 0 | ? 0 | ? |
| SocioMétrica/El Español | 1 Sep–8 Nov 2026 | ? | ? | ? 16 | ? 10 | ? 5 | | – | – | | ? 0 | ? 0 | ? |
| SW Demoscopia/La Séptima | 26 Oct–7 Nov 2026 | ? | ? | ? 14 | ? 11 | ? 6 | | – | – | | ? 0 | ? 0 | ? |
| SW Demoscopia/La Séptima | 26 Oct–6 Nov 2026 | ? | ? | ? 15 | ? 11 | ? 5 | | – | – | | ? 0 | ? 0 | ? |
| GAD3/Vocento | 3–5 Nov 2026 | ? | ? | ? 17 | ? 10 | ? 4 | | – | – | | ? 0 | ? 0 | ? |
| SW Demoscopia/La Séptima | 26 Oct–5 Nov 2026 | ? | ? | ? 14 | ? 11 | ? 6 | | – | – | | ? 0 | ? 0 | ? |
| SW Demoscopia/La Séptima | 26 Oct–4 Nov 2026 | ? | ? | ? 15 | ? 11 | ? 5 | | – | – | | ? 0 | ? 0 | ? |
| CIS | 7–30 Oct 2026 | 4,550 | ? | ? 10/15 | ? 12/18 | ? 1/8 | | – | – | | ? 0 | ? 0 | ? |
| Sigma Dos/El Mundo | 1–8 Oct 2026 | ? | ? | ? 16 | ? 8 | ? 7 | ? 0 | – | – | ? 0 | ? 0 | – | ? |
| 2026 regional election | 15 Mar 2026 | —N/a | 60.6 | 35.4 (13) | 30.8 (10) | 18.9 (7) | 2.3 (0) | 4.3 (1) | 0.7 (0) | 0.8 (0) | 1.4 (0) | – | 4.6 |
| Sigma Dos/El Mundo | 30 Oct–6 Nov 2025 | ? | ? | ? 17 | ? 10 | ? 4 | ? 0 | – | – | ? 0 | ? 0 | – | ? |
| Sigma Dos/El Mundo | 17 Sep–1 Oct 2025 | ? | ? | ? 17 | ? 10 | ? 4 | ? 0 | – | – | ? 0 | ? 0 | – | ? |
| Sigma Dos/El Mundo | 20–28 Aug 2025 | ? | ? | ? 18 | ? 9 | ? 4 | ? 0 | – | – | ? 0 | ? 0 | – | ? |
| Sigma Dos/El Mundo | 21–30 Jul 2025 | ? | ? | ? 18 | ? 9 | ? 4 | ? 0 | – | – | ? 0 | ? 0 | – | ? |
| Sigma Dos/El Mundo | 20–27 Jun 2025 | ? | ? | ? 18 | ? 10 | ? 3 | ? 0 | – | – | ? 0 | ? 0 | – | ? |
| Sigma Dos/El Mundo | 21 Apr–28 May 2025 | ? | ? | ? 18 | ? 12 | ? 1 | ? 0 | – | – | ? 0 | ? 0 | – | ? |
| Sigma Dos/El Mundo | 4–15 Apr 2025 | ? | ? | ? 18 | ? 12 | ? 1 | ? 0 | – | – | ? 0 | ? 0 | – | ? |
| Sigma Dos/El Mundo | 24 Feb–7 Mar 2025 | ? | ? | ? 18 | ? 12 | ? 1 | ? 0 | – | – | ? 0 | ? 0 | – | ? |
| Sigma Dos/El Mundo | 24–31 Jan 2025 | ? | ? | ? 18 | ? 12 | ? 1 | ? 0 | – | – | ? 0 | ? 0 | – | ? |
| Sigma Dos/El Mundo | 13–26 Dec 2024 | ? | ? | ? 19 | ? 11 | ? 1 | ? 0 | – | – | ? 0 | ? 0 | – | ? |
| Sigma Dos/El Mundo | 20–27 Sep 2024 | ? | ? | ? 19 | ? 12 | ? 0 | ? 0 | – | – | ? 0 | ? 0 | – | ? |
| 2024 EP election | 9 Jun 2024 | —N/a | 51.5 | 44.5 (19) | 30.5 (12) | 10.5 (0) | 2.9 (0) | – | – | 2.4 (0) | 4.0 (0) | – | 14.0 |
| 2023 general election | 23 Jul 2023 | —N/a | 69.4 | 41.5; 18 | 32.3; 12 | 13.8; 1 | 7.0; 0 | 1.6; 0 | 0.7; 0 | | – | – | 9.2 |

=== Castilla–La Mancha ===
| Polling firm/Commissioner | Fieldwork date | Sample size | Turnout | PP | PSOE | Vox | Sumar | Podemos | SALF | FA | Lead |
|---|---|---|---|---|---|---|---|---|---|---|---|
| SocioMétrica/El Español | 1 Sep–15 Nov 2026 | ? | ? | ? 8 | ? 7 | ? 6 | | ? 0 | ? 0 | ? 0 | ? |
| SW Demoscopia/La Séptima | 26 Oct–15 Nov 2026 | ? | ? | ? 7/8 | ? 7/9 | ? 5/6 | | ? 0 | ? 0 | ? 0 | ? |
| SW Demoscopia/La Séptima | 26 Oct–14 Nov 2026 | ? | ? | ? 7/8 | ? 7/9 | ? 5/6 | | ? 0 | ? 0 | ? 0 | ? |
| Sondaxe/La Voz de Galicia | 9–13 Nov 2026 | ? | ? | ? 8 | ? 7 | ? 6 | | ? 0 | ? 0 | ? 0 | ? |
| Sigma Dos/El Mundo | 3–13 Nov 2026 | ? | ? | ? 8/10 | ? 7 | ? 4/6 | | ? 0 | ? 0 | ? 0 | ? |
| SW Demoscopia/La Séptima | 26 Oct–13 Nov 2026 | ? | ? | ? 7/8 | ? 7/8 | ? 5/6 | | ? 0 | ? 0 | ? 0 | Tie |
| SW Demoscopia/La Séptima | 26 Oct–12 Nov 2026 | ? | ? | ? 7/8 | ? 7/8 | ? 5/6 | | ? 0 | ? 0 | ? 0 | Tie |
| SW Demoscopia/La Séptima | 26 Oct–11 Nov 2026 | ? | ? | ? 7/8 | ? 7/8 | ? 5/6 | | ? 0 | ? 0 | ? 0 | Tie |
| SW Demoscopia/La Séptima | 26 Oct–10 Nov 2026 | ? | ? | ? 7 | ? 8 | ? 6 | | ? 0 | ? 0 | ? 0 | ? |
| SW Demoscopia/La Séptima | 26 Oct–9 Nov 2026 | ? | ? | ? 8 | ? 7 | ? 6 | | ? 0 | ? 0 | ? 0 | ? |
| SW Demoscopia/La Séptima | 26 Oct–8 Nov 2026 | ? | ? | ? 8 | ? 7 | ? 6 | | ? 0 | ? 0 | ? 0 | ? |
| SocioMétrica/El Español | 1 Sep–8 Nov 2026 | ? | ? | ? 8 | ? 7 | ? 6 | | ? 0 | ? 0 | ? 0 | ? |
| SW Demoscopia/La Séptima | 26 Oct–7 Nov 2026 | ? | ? | ? 8 | ? 7 | ? 6 | | ? 0 | ? 0 | ? 0 | ? |
| SW Demoscopia/La Séptima | 26 Oct–6 Nov 2026 | ? | ? | ? 8 | ? 7 | ? 6 | | ? 0 | ? 0 | ? 0 | ? |
| GAD3/Vocento | 3–5 Nov 2026 | ? | ? | ? 8 | ? 7 | ? 6 | | ? 0 | ? 0 | ? 0 | ? |
| CIS | 7–30 Oct 2026 | 2,826 | ? | ? 6/7 | ? 8/9 | ? 5/6 | | ? 0 | ? 0 | ? 0 | ? |
| Sigma Dos/El Mundo | 1–8 Oct 2026 | ? | ? | ? 8 | ? 7 | ? 6 | ? 0 | ? 0 | ? 0 | – | ? |
| Sigma Dos/El Mundo | 30 Oct–6 Nov 2025 | ? | ? | ? 9 | ? 7 | ? 5 | ? 0 | ? 0 | ? 0 | – | ? |
| Sigma Dos/El Mundo | 17 Sep–1 Oct 2025 | ? | ? | ? 9 | ? 7 | ? 5 | ? 0 | ? 0 | ? 0 | – | ? |
| Sigma Dos/El Mundo | 20–28 Aug 2025 | ? | ? | ? 10 | ? 7 | ? 4 | ? 0 | ? 0 | ? 0 | – | ? |
| Sigma Dos/El Mundo | 21–30 Jul 2025 | ? | ? | ? 10 | ? 7 | ? 4 | ? 0 | ? 0 | ? 0 | – | ? |
| Sigma Dos/El Mundo | 20–27 Jun 2025 | ? | ? | ? 10 | ? 7 | ? 4 | ? 0 | ? 0 | ? 0 | – | ? |
| Sigma Dos/El Mundo | 21 Apr–28 May 2025 | ? | ? | ? 10 | ? 7 | ? 4 | ? 0 | ? 0 | ? 0 | – | ? |
| Sigma Dos/El Mundo | 4–15 Apr 2025 | ? | ? | ? 10 | ? 7 | ? 4 | ? 0 | ? 0 | ? 0 | – | ? |
| Sigma Dos/El Mundo | 24 Feb–7 Mar 2025 | ? | ? | ? 10 | ? 7 | ? 4 | ? 0 | ? 0 | ? 0 | – | ? |
| Sigma Dos/El Mundo | 24–31 Jan 2025 | ? | ? | ? 10 | ? 7 | ? 4 | ? 0 | ? 0 | ? 0 | – | ? |
| Sigma Dos/El Mundo | 13–26 Dec 2024 | ? | ? | ? 10 | ? 7 | ? 4 | ? 0 | ? 0 | ? 0 | – | ? |
| Sigma Dos/El Mundo | 20–27 Sep 2024 | ? | ? | ? 12 | ? 8 | ? 1 | ? 0 | ? 0 | ? 0 | – | ? |
| 2024 EP election | 9 Jun 2024 | —N/a | 50.3 | 41.5 (12) | 31.7 (8) | 13.0 (1) | 3.0 (0) | 2.2 (0) | 5.0 (0) | – | 9.8 |
| 2023 general election | 23 Jul 2023 | —N/a | 73.0 | 38.9; 10 | 34.2; 8 | 17.8; 3 | 7.4; 0 | | – | – | 4.7 |

=== Catalonia ===
| Polling firm/Commissioner | Fieldwork date | Sample size | Turnout | PSC | Sumar | PP | ERC | Junts | Vox | CUP | Podem | Aliança.cat | FA | Lead |
|---|---|---|---|---|---|---|---|---|---|---|---|---|---|---|
| SocioMétrica/El Español | 1 Sep–15 Nov 2026 | ? | ? | ? 19 | | ? 7 | ? 9 | ? 5 | ? 6 | – | (Note: Within ERC.) | – | ? 2 | ? |
| SW Demoscopia/La Séptima | 26 Oct–15 Nov 2026 | ? | ? | ? 18/21 | | ? 4/6 | ? 11/14 | ? 3/5 | ? 5/7 | – | | – | ? 2 | ? |
| SW Demoscopia/La Séptima | 26 Oct–14 Nov 2026 | ? | ? | ? 18/21 | | ? 4/6 | ? 11/13 | ? 3/5 | ? 4/6 | – | | – | ? 2 | ? |
| Sondaxe/La Voz de Galicia | 9–13 Nov 2026 | ? | ? | ? 17 | | ? 7 | ? 9 | ? 6 | ? 6 | – | | – | ? 3 | ? |
| Sigma Dos/El Mundo | 3–13 Nov 2026 | ? | ? | ? 15/17 | | ? 6/8 | ? 10/11 | ? 4/6 | ? 5/7 | – | | – | ? 2/4 | ? |
| SW Demoscopia/La Séptima | 26 Oct–13 Nov 2026 | ? | ? | ? 18/21 | | ? 4/6 | ? 11/14 | ? 3/5 | ? 4/6 | – | | – | ? 2 | ? |
| YouGov/Ara | 26 Oct–12 Nov 2026 | 350 | ? | ? 15/18 | | ? 5/7 | ? 10/15 | ? 3/6 | ? 6/8 | – | | – | ? 3/5 | ? |
| SW Demoscopia/La Séptima | 26 Oct–12 Nov 2026 | ? | ? | ? 18/21 | | ? 4/6 | ? 11/14 | ? 3/5 | ? 5/6 | – | | – | ? 2 | ? |
| SW Demoscopia/La Séptima | 26 Oct–11 Nov 2026 | ? | ? | ? 18/21 | | ? 4/6 | ? 11/14 | ? 3/5 | ? 4/6 | – | | – | ? 2 | ? |
| SW Demoscopia/La Séptima | 26 Oct–10 Nov 2026 | ? | ? | ? 19 | | ? 5 | ? 12 | ? 4 | ? 6 | – | | – | ? 2 | ? |
| SW Demoscopia/La Séptima | 26 Oct–9 Nov 2026 | ? | ? | ? 20 | | ? 5 | ? 10 | ? 4 | ? 6 | – | | – | ? 3 | ? |
| SW Demoscopia/La Séptima | 26 Oct–8 Nov 2026 | ? | ? | ? 20 | | ? 5 | ? 10 | ? 4 | ? 6 | – | | – | ? 3 | ? |
| SocioMétrica/El Español | 1 Sep–8 Nov 2026 | ? | ? | ? 18 | | ? 7 | ? 9 | ? 6 | ? 6 | – | | – | ? 2 | ? |
| SW Demoscopia/La Séptima | 26 Oct–7 Nov 2026 | ? | ? | ? 20 | | ? 5 | ? 10 | ? 4 | ? 6 | – | | – | ? 3 | ? |
| SW Demoscopia/La Séptima | 26 Oct–6 Nov 2026 | ? | ? | ? 20 | | ? 5 | ? 10 | ? 4 | ? 6 | – | | – | ? 3 | ? |
| GAD3/Vocento | 3–5 Nov 2026 | ? | ? | ? 16 | | ? 7 | ? 12 | ? 5 | ? 6 | – | | – | ? 2 | ? |
| SW Demoscopia/La Séptima | 26 Oct–5 Nov 2026 | ? | ? | ? 19 | | ? 5 | ? 11 | ? 4 | ? 6 | – | | – | ? 3 | ? |
| SW Demoscopia/La Séptima | 26 Oct–4 Nov 2026 | ? | ? | ? 19 | | ? 5 | ? 11 | ? 4 | ? 6 | – | | – | ? 3 | ? |
| EM-Analytics/Electomanía | 28–30 Oct 2026 | ? | ? | 34.0; 19 | | 14.5; 7 | 17.9; 8 | 10.6; 5 | 12.5; 6 | – | | – | 9.2; 3 | 16.1 |
| CIS | 7–30 Oct 2026 | 5,596 | ? | ? 17/22 | | ? 3/6 | ? 10/15 | ? 1/5 | ? 5/8 | – | | – | ? 2/3 | ? |
| ERC | 16 Oct 2026 | 400 | ? | 33.6; 19 | | 7.3; 3 | 21.8; 10 | 12.0; 6 | 16.8; 8 | – | | – | 4.2; 2 | 11.8 |
| Sigma Dos/El Mundo | 1–8 Oct 2026 | ? | ? | ? 16 | ? 2 | ? 6 | ? 9 | ? 7 | ? 7 | ? 0 | ? 1 | – | – | ? |
| GESOP/CEO | 1 Sep–5 Oct 2026 | 2,000 | ? | 29.6; 18/19 | 6.0; 2/3 | 13.1; 6/7 | 19.0; 10/11 | 10.3; 4/5 | 12.2; 5/6 | 2.8; 0/1 | 2.5; 0 | – | – | 10.6 |
| GESOP/CEO | 21 May–25 Jun 2026 | 2,000 | ? | 29.0; 17/18 | 8.0; 3/4 | 11.0; 5/6 | 17.7; 10/11 | 10.8; 4/5 | 12.8; 6/7 | 3.3; 0/1 | 3.5; 0/1 | – | – | 11.3 |
| Opinòmetre/CEO | 13 Oct–11 Nov 2025 | 2,000 | ? | 31.3; 19/20 | 7.8; 3 | 11.1; 5/6 | 17.7; 9/10 | 10.6; 5/6 | 11.4; 5/6 | 2.6; 0 | 3.6; 0/1 | – | – | 13.6 |
| Sigma Dos/El Mundo | 30 Oct–6 Nov 2025 | ? | ? | ? 19 | ? 2 | ? 8 | ? 7 | ? 4 | ? 6 | ? 0 | ? 1 | ? 1 | – | ? |
| Sigma Dos/El Mundo | 17 Sep–1 Oct 2025 | ? | ? | ? 19 | ? 3 | ? 8 | ? 7 | ? 4 | ? 5 | ? 0 | ? 1 | ? 1 | – | ? |
| Sigma Dos/El Mundo | 20–28 Aug 2025 | ? | ? | ? 18 | ? 3 | ? 8 | ? 8 | ? 5 | ? 5 | ? 0 | ? 1 | – | – | ? |
| Sigma Dos/El Mundo | 21–30 Jul 2025 | ? | ? | ? 18 | ? 3 | ? 9 | ? 7 | ? 5 | ? 5 | ? 0 | ? 1 | – | – | ? |
| Opinòmetre/CEO | 30 May–28 Jun 2025 | 2,000 | ? | 31.9; 18/19 | 8.7; 3/4 | 12.2; 5/6 | 14.5; 7/8 | 11.0; 6/7 | 10.4; 4/5 | 3.1; 0 | 3.5; 0/1 | – | – | 17.4 |
| Sigma Dos/El Mundo | 20–27 Jun 2025 | ? | ? | ? 19 | ? 3 | ? 9 | ? 7 | ? 5 | ? 4 | ? 0 | ? 1 | – | – | ? |
| Sigma Dos/El Mundo | 21 Apr–28 May 2025 | ? | ? | ? 19 | ? 3 | ? 9 | ? 7 | ? 5 | ? 3 | ? 0 | ? 2 | – | – | ? |
| Sigma Dos/El Mundo | 4–15 Apr 2025 | ? | ? | ? 18 | ? 3 | ? 8 | ? 8 | ? 7 | ? 3 | ? 0 | ? 1 | – | – | ? |
| Opinòmetre/CEO | 14 Feb–14 Mar 2025 | 2,000 | ? | 33.0; 19/21 | 7.8; 2/3 | 12.6; 5/7 | 13.6; 7/8 | 11.3; 6/8 | 8.5; 2/3 | 3.9; 0/1 | 4.8; 1 | – | – | 19.4 |
| Sigma Dos/El Mundo | 24 Feb–7 Mar 2025 | ? | ? | ? 18 | ? 2 | ? 9 | ? 7 | ? 8 | ? 3 | ? 0 | ? 1 | – | – | ? |
| Sigma Dos/El Mundo | 24–31 Jan 2025 | ? | ? | ? 17 | ? 3 | ? 8 | ? 7 | ? 7 | ? 4 | ? 0 | ? 2 | – | – | ? |
| Sigma Dos/El Mundo | 13–26 Dec 2024 | ? | ? | ? 17 | ? 3 | ? 8 | ? 8 | ? 8 | ? 3 | ? 0 | ? 1 | – | – | ? |
| GESOP/CEO | 11 Oct–24 Nov 2024 | 2,000 | ? | 33.0– 37.0; 18/21 | 11.0– 14.0; 4/6 | 12.0– 15.0; 5/8 | 10.0– 13.0; 5/7 | 10.0– 13.0; 5/8 | 7.0– 9.0; 2/4 | 3.0– 5.0; 0/2 | | – | – | 21.0– 22.0 |
| Sigma Dos/El Mundo | 20–27 Sep 2024 | ? | ? | ? 19 | ? 3 | ? 8 | ? 7 | ? 8 | ? 2 | ? 0 | ? 1 | – | – | ? |
| 2024 EP election | 9 Jun 2024 | —N/a | 43.5 | 30.6 (18) | 4.3 (1) | 13.8 (6) | 14.8 (8) | 18.0 (12) | 6.2 (2) | – | 4.6 (1) | – | – | 12.6 |
| 2024 regional election | 12 May 2024 | —N/a | 55.3 | 28.0 (16) | 5.8 (2) | 11.0 (5) | 13.7 (8) | 21.6 (14) | 8.0 (2) | 4.1 (1) | – | 3.8 (0) | – | 6.4 |
| GESOP/CEO | 9 Feb–7 Mar 2024 | 2,000 | ? | 31.0– 35.0; 17/20 | 10.0– 13.0; 4/6 | 13.0– 16.0; 6/9 | 13.0– 16.0; 7/8 | 10.0– 13.0; 5/8 | 6.0– 8.0; 2/4 | 3.0– 4.0; 0/1 | | – | – | 18.0– 19.0 |
| GESOP/CEO | 9 Oct–7 Nov 2023 | 2,000 | ? | 29.0– 33.0; 15/18 | 10.0– 13.0; 3/6 | 17.0– 21.0; 9/11 | 14.0– 17.0; 7/10 | 10.0– 12.0; 5/8 | 5.0– 7.0; 1/2 | 2.0– 3.0; 0/1 | | – | – | 12.0 |
| Sigma Dos/El Mundo | 7–9 Sep 2023 | 1,000 | ? | 33.6; 18 | 14.5; 7 | 14.4; 6 | 12.4; 7 | 12.5; 8 | 7.0; 2 | – | | – | – | 19.1 |
| 2023 general election | 23 Jul 2023 | —N/a | 62.7 | 34.5; 19 | 14.0; 7 | 13.3; 6 | 13.2; 7 | 11.2; 7 | 7.8; 2 | 2.8; 0 | | – | – | 20.5 |

=== Extremadura ===
| Polling firm/Commissioner | Fieldwork date | Sample size | Turnout | PSOE | PP | Vox | Sumar | Podemos | SALF | FA | Lead |
|---|---|---|---|---|---|---|---|---|---|---|---|
| SocioMétrica/El Español | 1 Sep–15 Nov 2026 | ? | ? | ? 3 | ? 4 | ? 2 | | ? 0 | ? 0 | ? 0 | ? |
| SW Demoscopia/La Séptima | 26 Oct–15 Nov 2026 | ? | ? | ? 4 | ? 3/4 | ? 1/2 | | ? 0 | ? 0 | ? 0 | ? |
| SW Demoscopia/La Séptima | 26 Oct–14 Nov 2026 | ? | ? | ? 4 | ? 3/4 | ? 1/2 | | ? 0 | ? 0 | ? 0 | ? |
| Sondaxe/La Voz de Galicia | 9–13 Nov 2026 | ? | ? | ? 3 | ? 4 | ? 2 | | ? 0 | ? 0 | ? 0 | ? |
| Sigma Dos/El Mundo | 3–13 Nov 2026 | ? | ? | ? 3 | ? 4 | ? 2 | | ? 0 | ? 0 | ? 0 | ? |
| SW Demoscopia/La Séptima | 26 Oct–13 Nov 2026 | ? | ? | ? 4 | ? 3/4 | ? 1/2 | | ? 0 | ? 0 | ? 0 | ? |
| SW Demoscopia/La Séptima | 26 Oct–12 Nov 2026 | ? | ? | ? 4 | ? 3/4 | ? 1/2 | | ? 0 | ? 0 | ? 0 | ? |
| SW Demoscopia/La Séptima | 26 Oct–11 Nov 2026 | ? | ? | ? 4 | ? 3/4 | ? 1/2 | | ? 0 | ? 0 | ? 0 | ? |
| SocioMétrica/El Español | 1 Sep–8 Nov 2026 | ? | ? | ? 3 | ? 4 | ? 2 | | ? 0 | ? 0 | ? 0 | ? |
| GAD3/Vocento | 3–5 Nov 2026 | ? | ? | ? 3 | ? 4 | ? 2 | | ? 0 | ? 0 | ? 0 | ? |
| CIS | 7–30 Oct 2026 | 1,240 | ? | ? 4/5 | ? 3 | ? 1/2 | | ? 0 | ? 0 | ? 0 | ? |
| Sigma Dos/El Mundo | 1–8 Oct 2026 | ? | ? | ? 3 | ? 4 | ? 2 | ? 0 | ? 0 | ? 0 | – | ? |
| 2025 regional election | 21 Dec 2025 | —N/a | 60.8 | 25.8 (2) | 43.1 (5) | 16.9 (2) | 10.3 (0) | | – | – | ? |
| Sigma Dos/El Mundo | 30 Oct–6 Nov 2025 | ? | ? | ? 3 | ? 4 | ? 2 | ? 0 | ? 0 | ? 0 | – | ? |
| Sigma Dos/El Mundo | 17 Sep–1 Oct 2025 | ? | ? | ? 3 | ? 4 | ? 2 | ? 0 | ? 0 | ? 0 | – | ? |
| Sigma Dos/El Mundo | 20–28 Aug 2025 | ? | ? | ? 4 | ? 4 | ? 1 | ? 0 | ? 0 | ? 0 | – | Tie |
| Sigma Dos/El Mundo | 21–30 Jul 2025 | ? | ? | ? 4 | ? 4 | ? 1 | ? 0 | ? 0 | ? 0 | – | Tie |
| Sigma Dos/El Mundo | 20–27 Jun 2025 | ? | ? | ? 4 | ? 4 | ? 1 | ? 0 | ? 0 | ? 0 | – | Tie |
| Sigma Dos/El Mundo | 21 Apr–28 May 2025 | ? | ? | ? 4 | ? 4 | ? 1 | ? 0 | ? 0 | ? 0 | – | Tie |
| Sigma Dos/El Mundo | 4–15 Apr 2025 | ? | ? | ? 4 | ? 4 | ? 1 | ? 0 | ? 0 | ? 0 | – | Tie |
| Sigma Dos/El Mundo | 24 Feb–7 Mar 2025 | ? | ? | ? 4 | ? 4 | ? 1 | ? 0 | ? 0 | ? 0 | – | Tie |
| Sigma Dos/El Mundo | 24–31 Jan 2025 | ? | ? | ? 4 | ? 4 | ? 1 | ? 0 | ? 0 | ? 0 | – | Tie |
| Sigma Dos/El Mundo | 13–26 Dec 2024 | ? | ? | ? 4 | ? 4 | ? 1 | ? 0 | ? 0 | ? 0 | – | Tie |
| Sigma Dos/El Mundo | 20–27 Sep 2024 | ? | ? | ? 4 | ? 5 | ? 0 | ? 0 | ? 0 | ? 0 | – | ? |
| 2024 EP election | 9 Jun 2024 | —N/a | 46.9 | 36.6 (4) | 41.4 (5) | 10.0 (0) | 2.5 (0) | 2.2 (0) | 3.4 (0) | – | 4.8 |
| 2023 general election | 23 Jul 2023 | —N/a | 71.7 | 39.1; 4 | 37.9; 4 | 13.6; 1 | 6.9; 0 | | – | – | 1.2 |

=== Galicia ===
| Polling firm/Commissioner | Fieldwork date | Sample size | Turnout | PP | PSdeG–PSOE | Sumar | BNG | Vox | Podemos | SALF | FA | Lead |
|---|---|---|---|---|---|---|---|---|---|---|---|---|
| Sondaxe/La Voz de Galicia | 16–20 Nov 2026 | 1,200 | ? | 41.4; 14 | 28.7; 7 | | 15.4; 2 | 7.0; 0 | – | – | ? 0 | 12.7 |
| Sondaxe/La Voz de Galicia | 15–19 Nov 2026 | 1,200 | ? | 41.8; 14 | 28.2; 7 | | 15.2; 2 | 7.8; 0 | – | – | ? 0 | 13.6 |
| Sondaxe/La Voz de Galicia | 14–18 Nov 2026 | 1,200 | ? | 42.3; 13 | 26.4; 7 | | 15.1; 2 | 8.2; 1 | – | – | ? 0 | 15.9 |
| Sondaxe/La Voz de Galicia | 13–17 Nov 2026 | 1,200 | ? | 41.5; 13 | 26.6; 7 | | 15.3; 2 | 8.7; 1 | – | – | ? 0 | 14.9 |
| Sondaxe/La Voz de Galicia | 12–16 Nov 2026 | 1,200 | ? | 41.2; 13 | 27.5; 7 | | 13.5; 2 | 9.8; 1 | – | – | ? 0 | 13.7 |
| Sondaxe/La Voz de Galicia | 11–15 Nov 2026 | 1,200 | 75.3 | 41.1; 12 | 27.9; 8 | | 13.7; 2 | 9.5; 1 | – | – | ? 0 | 13.2 |
| SocioMétrica/El Español | 1 Sep–15 Nov 2026 | ? | ? | ? 13 | ? 6 | | ? 2 | ? 2 | ? 0 | ? 0 | ? 0 | ? |
| SW Demoscopia/La Séptima | 26 Oct–15 Nov 2026 | ? | ? | ? 11/13 | ? 8/10 | | ? 2/3 | ? 0 | ? 0 | ? 0 | ? 0 | ? |
| SW Demoscopia/La Séptima | 26 Oct–14 Nov 2026 | ? | ? | ? 11/13 | ? 8/10 | | ? 2/3 | ? 0 | ? 0 | ? 0 | ? 0 | ? |
| Sondaxe/La Voz de Galicia | 10–14 Nov 2026 | 1,200 | ? | 40.4; 13 | 27.1; 7 | | 14.0; 2 | 10.3; 1 | – | – | 5.1; 0 | 13.3 |
| Sondaxe/La Voz de Galicia | 9–13 Nov 2026 | 1,200 | ? | 39.6; 13 | 27.8; 7 | | 14.4; 2 | 10.5; 1 | – | – | 4.4; 0 | 11.8 |
| Sigma Dos/El Mundo | 3–13 Nov 2026 | ? | ? | ? 11/13 | ? 6/8 | | ? 2/3 | ? 2 | ? 0 | ? 0 | ? 0 | ? |
| SW Demoscopia/La Séptima | 26 Oct–13 Nov 2026 | ? | ? | ? 11/12 | ? 8/10 | | ? 2 | ? 0 | ? 0 | ? 0 | ? 0 | ? |
| SW Demoscopia/La Séptima | 26 Oct–12 Nov 2026 | ? | ? | ? 11/13 | ? 8/10 | | ? 2 | ? 0 | ? 0 | ? 0 | ? 0 | ? |
| SW Demoscopia/La Séptima | 26 Oct–11 Nov 2026 | ? | ? | ? 11/13 | ? 8/10 | | ? 2 | ? 0 | ? 0 | ? 0 | ? 0 | ? |
| SW Demoscopia/La Séptima | 26 Oct–10 Nov 2026 | ? | ? | ? 11 | ? 10 | | ? 2 | ? 0 | ? 0 | ? 0 | ? 0 | ? |
| SW Demoscopia/La Séptima | 26 Oct–9 Nov 2026 | ? | ? | ? 11 | ? 10 | | ? 2 | ? 0 | ? 0 | ? 0 | ? 0 | ? |
| SW Demoscopia/La Séptima | 26 Oct–8 Nov 2026 | ? | ? | ? 11 | ? 10 | | ? 2 | ? 0 | ? 0 | ? 0 | ? 0 | ? |
| SocioMétrica/El Español | 1 Sep–8 Nov 2026 | ? | ? | ? 13 | ? 6 | | ? 2 | ? 2 | ? 0 | ? 0 | ? 0 | ? |
| SW Demoscopia/La Séptima | 26 Oct–7 Nov 2026 | ? | ? | ? 11 | ? 10 | | ? 2 | ? 0 | ? 0 | ? 0 | ? 0 | ? |
| SW Demoscopia/La Séptima | 26 Oct–6 Nov 2026 | ? | ? | ? 11 | ? 10 | | ? 2 | ? 0 | ? 0 | ? 0 | ? 0 | ? |
| GAD3/Vocento | 3–5 Nov 2026 | ? | ? | ? 15 | ? 6 | | ? 2 | ? 0 | ? 0 | ? 0 | ? 0 | ? |
| SW Demoscopia/La Séptima | 26 Oct–5 Nov 2026 | ? | ? | ? 11 | ? 10 | | ? 2 | ? 0 | ? 0 | ? 0 | ? 0 | ? |
| SW Demoscopia/La Séptima | 26 Oct–4 Nov 2026 | ? | ? | ? 11 | ? 10 | | ? 2 | ? 0 | ? 0 | ? 0 | ? 0 | ? |
| EM-Analytics/Electomanía | 28–30 Oct 2026 | ? | ? | 40.9; 12/14 | 25.3; 6 | | 16.6; 1/3 | 7.9; 0/1 | 1.8; 0 | 0.5; 0 | 6.6; 0/1 | 15.3 |
| CIS | 7–30 Oct 2026 | 3,202 | ? | ? 8/11 | ? 9/13 | | ? 2/3 | ? 0/3 | ? 0 | ? 0 | ? 0 | ? |
| Sigma Dos/El Mundo | 1–8 Oct 2026 | ? | ? | ? 15 | ? 6 | ? 0 | ? 2 | ? 0 | – | – | – | ? |
| Sondaxe/La Voz de Galicia | 9–24 Sep 2026 | 1,223 | ? | 40.3; 14 | 26.7; 7 | 6.4; 0 | 14.0; 2 | 8.5; 0 | – | – | – | 13.6 |
| Sondaxe/La Voz de Galicia | 12–25 Feb 2026 | 1,223 | ? | 40.8; 14 | 25.4; 7 | 6.3; 0 | 14.7; 2 | 8.1; 0 | – | – | – | 15.4 |
| Sondaxe/La Voz de Galicia | 3–11 Dec 2025 | 1,223 | ? | 39.2; 13 | 24.9; 6 | 8.2; 1 | 15.2; 3 | – | – | – | – | 14.3 |
| Sigma Dos/El Mundo | 30 Oct–6 Nov 2025 | ? | ? | ? 15 | ? 6 | ? 0 | ? 2 | ? 0 | – | – | – | ? |
| Sigma Dos/El Mundo | 17 Sep–1 Oct 2025 | ? | ? | ? 15 | ? 6 | ? 0 | ? 2 | ? 0 | – | – | – | ? |
| Sondaxe/La Voz de Galicia | 17–25 Sep 2025 | 1,223 | ? | 41.3; 14 | 25.5; 7 | 7.1; 0 | 13.8; 2 | 7.7; 0 | – | – | – | 15.8 |
| Sigma Dos/El Mundo | 20–28 Aug 2025 | ? | ? | ? 15 | ? 6 | ? 0 | ? 2 | ? 0 | – | – | – | ? |
| Sigma Dos/El Mundo | 21–30 Jul 2025 | ? | ? | ? 15 | ? 6 | ? 0 | ? 2 | ? 0 | – | – | – | ? |
| Sigma Dos/El Mundo | 20–27 Jun 2025 | ? | ? | ? 15 | ? 6 | ? 0 | ? 2 | ? 0 | – | – | – | ? |
| Sigma Dos/El Mundo | 21 Apr–28 May 2025 | ? | ? | ? 15 | ? 6 | ? 0 | ? 2 | ? 0 | – | – | – | ? |
| Sigma Dos/El Mundo | 4–15 Apr 2025 | ? | ? | ? 15 | ? 6 | ? 0 | ? 2 | ? 0 | – | – | – | ? |
| Sigma Dos/El Mundo | 24 Feb–7 Mar 2025 | ? | ? | ? 15 | ? 6 | ? 0 | ? 2 | ? 0 | – | – | – | ? |
| Sondaxe/La Voz de Galicia | 5–13 Feb 2025 | 1,223 | ? | 42.4; 14 | 27.0; 7 | 6.6; 0 | 14.0; 2 | 6.0; 0 | – | – | – | 15.4 |
| Sigma Dos/El Mundo | 24–31 Jan 2025 | ? | ? | ? 14 | ? 7 | ? 0 | ? 2 | ? 0 | – | – | – | ? |
| Sigma Dos/El Mundo | 13–26 Dec 2024 | ? | ? | ? 15 | ? 6 | ? 0 | ? 2 | ? 0 | – | – | – | ? |
| Sondaxe/La Voz de Galicia | 24 Sep–2 Oct 2024 | 1,223 | ? | 44.8; 13 | 25.1; 6 | 9.0; 2 | 13.4; 2 | – | – | – | – | 19.7 |
| Sigma Dos/El Mundo | 20–27 Sep 2024 | ? | ? | ? 15 | ? 6 | ? 0 | ? 2 | ? 0 | – | – | – | ? |
| 2024 EP election | 9 Jun 2024 | —N/a | 42.0 | 43.6 (14) | 27.0 (7) | 2.1 (0) | 16.1 (2) | 4.4 (0) | 2.0 (0) | 2.0 (0) | – | 16.6 |
| 2024 regional election | 18 Feb 2024 | —N/a | 56.3 | 47.4 (13) | 14.1 (2) | 1.9 (0) | 31.3 (8) | 2.3 (0) | 0.3 (0) | – | – | 15.8 |
| Sondaxe/La Voz de Galicia | 29 Dec–4 Jan 2024 | 1,226 | ? | 45.7; 13 | 25.0; 6 | 10.4; 2 | 12.7; 2 | – | – | – | – | 20.7 |
| Sondaxe/La Voz de Galicia | 18–26 Oct 2023 | 1,223 | 74.0 | 44.5; 13 | 27.3; 6 | 10.4; 2 | 10.3; 2 | 4.9; 0 | – | – | – | 17.2 |
| 2023 general election | 23 Jul 2023 | —N/a | 61.4 | 43.6; 13 | 29.8; 7 | 10.9; 2 | 9.4; 1 | 4.9; 0 | | – | – | 13.8 |

=== La Rioja ===
| Polling firm/Commissioner | Fieldwork date | Sample size | Turnout | PP | PSOE | Vox | Sumar | Podemos | SALF | FA | Lead |
|---|---|---|---|---|---|---|---|---|---|---|---|
| SocioMétrica/El Español | 1 Sep–15 Nov 2026 | ? | ? | ? 2 | ? 1 | ? 1 | | ? 0 | ? 0 | ? 0 | ? |
| SW Demoscopia/La Séptima | 26 Oct–15 Nov 2026 | ? | ? | ? 2 | ? 2 | ? 0 | | ? 0 | ? 0 | ? 0 | Tie |
| SW Demoscopia/La Séptima | 26 Oct–14 Nov 2026 | ? | ? | ? 2 | ? 2 | ? 0 | | ? 0 | ? 0 | ? 0 | Tie |
| Sondaxe/La Voz de Galicia | 9–13 Nov 2026 | ? | ? | ? 2 | ? 2 | ? 0 | | ? 0 | ? 0 | ? 0 | Tie |
| Sigma Dos/El Mundo | 3–13 Nov 2026 | ? | ? | ? 2 | ? 1 | ? 1 | | ? 0 | ? 0 | ? 0 | ? |
| SW Demoscopia/La Séptima | 26 Oct–13 Nov 2026 | ? | ? | ? 2 | ? 2 | ? 0 | | ? 0 | ? 0 | ? 0 | Tie |
| SW Demoscopia/La Séptima | 26 Oct–12 Nov 2026 | ? | ? | ? 2 | ? 2 | ? 0 | | ? 0 | ? 0 | ? 0 | Tie |
| SW Demoscopia/La Séptima | 26 Oct–11 Nov 2026 | ? | ? | ? 2 | ? 2 | ? 0 | | ? 0 | ? 0 | ? 0 | Tie |
| SocioMétrica/El Español | 1 Sep–8 Nov 2026 | ? | ? | ? 3 | ? 1 | ? 0 | | ? 0 | ? 0 | ? 0 | ? |
| GAD3/Vocento | 3–5 Nov 2026 | ? | ? | ? 2 | ? 1 | ? 1 | | ? 0 | ? 0 | ? 0 | ? |
| CIS | 7–30 Oct 2026 | 477 | ? | ? 2 | ? 2 | ? 0 | | ? 0 | ? 0 | ? 0 | Tie |
| Sigma Dos/El Mundo | 1–8 Oct 2026 | ? | ? | ? 2 | ? 1 | ? 1 | ? 0 | ? 0 | ? 0 | – | ? |
| Sigma Dos/El Mundo | 30 Oct–6 Nov 2025 | ? | ? | ? 3 | ? 1 | ? 0 | ? 0 | ? 0 | ? 0 | – | ? |
| Sigma Dos/El Mundo | 17 Sep–1 Oct 2025 | ? | ? | ? 3 | ? 1 | ? 0 | ? 0 | ? 0 | ? 0 | – | ? |
| Sigma Dos/El Mundo | 20–28 Aug 2025 | ? | ? | ? 3 | ? 1 | ? 0 | ? 0 | ? 0 | ? 0 | – | ? |
| Sigma Dos/El Mundo | 21–30 Jul 2025 | ? | ? | ? 3 | ? 1 | ? 0 | ? 0 | ? 0 | ? 0 | – | ? |
| Sigma Dos/El Mundo | 20–27 Jun 2025 | ? | ? | ? 3 | ? 1 | ? 0 | ? 0 | ? 0 | ? 0 | – | ? |
| Sigma Dos/El Mundo | 21 Apr–28 May 2025 | ? | ? | ? 2 | ? 2 | ? 0 | ? 0 | ? 0 | ? 0 | – | Tie |
| Sigma Dos/El Mundo | 4–15 Apr 2025 | ? | ? | ? 2 | ? 2 | ? 0 | ? 0 | ? 0 | ? 0 | – | Tie |
| Sigma Dos/El Mundo | 24 Feb–7 Mar 2025 | ? | ? | ? 2 | ? 2 | ? 0 | ? 0 | ? 0 | ? 0 | – | Tie |
| Sigma Dos/El Mundo | 24–31 Jan 2025 | ? | ? | ? 3 | ? 1 | ? 0 | ? 0 | ? 0 | ? 0 | – | ? |
| Sigma Dos/El Mundo | 13–26 Dec 2024 | ? | ? | ? 3 | ? 1 | ? 0 | ? 0 | ? 0 | ? 0 | – | ? |
| Sigma Dos/El Mundo | 20–27 Sep 2024 | ? | ? | ? 3 | ? 1 | ? 0 | ? 0 | ? 0 | ? 0 | – | ? |
| 2024 EP election | 9 Jun 2024 | —N/a | 49.1 | 44.6 (2) | 32.6 (2) | 8.8 (0) | 3.3 (0) | 2.4 (0) | 3.7 (0) | – | 12.0 |
| 2023 general election | 23 Jul 2023 | —N/a | 70.2 | 45.6; 2 | 35.7; 2 | 9.8; 0 | 6.6; 0 | | – | – | 9.9 |

=== Madrid ===
| Polling firm/Commissioner | Fieldwork date | Sample size | Turnout | PP | PSOE | Sumar | Vox | Podemos | SALF | IE | FA | Lead |
|---|---|---|---|---|---|---|---|---|---|---|---|---|
| SocioMétrica/El Español | 1 Sep–15 Nov 2026 | ? | ? | ? 16 | ? 10 | | ? 9 | ? 0 | ? 0 | – | ? 3 | ? |
| SW Demoscopia/La Séptima | 26 Oct–15 Nov 2026 | ? | ? | ? 14/16 | ? 11/13 | | ? 5/7 | ? 0/1 | ? 0 | – | ? 4/5 | ? |
| SW Demoscopia/La Séptima | 26 Oct–14 Nov 2026 | ? | ? | ? 14/16 | ? 11/13 | | ? 5/7 | ? 0/1 | ? 0 | – | ? 4/5 | ? |
| Sondaxe/La Voz de Galicia | 9–13 Nov 2026 | ? | ? | ? 15 | ? 9 | | ? 8 | ? 2 | ? 0 | – | ? 4 | ? |
| Sigma Dos/El Mundo | 3–13 Nov 2026 | ? | ? | ? 15/16 | ? 9/10 | | ? 8/9 | ? 0 | ? 0 | – | ? 4/5 | ? |
| SW Demoscopia/La Séptima | 26 Oct–13 Nov 2026 | ? | ? | ? 14/16 | ? 11/13 | | ? 5/7 | ? 0/1 | ? 0 | – | ? 4/5 | ? |
| SW Demoscopia/La Séptima | 26 Oct–12 Nov 2026 | ? | ? | ? 14/16 | ? 11/13 | | ? 5/7 | ? 0/1 | ? 0 | – | ? 4/5 | ? |
| SW Demoscopia/La Séptima | 26 Oct–11 Nov 2026 | ? | ? | ? 14/16 | ? 11/13 | | ? 5/7 | ? 0/1 | ? 0 | – | ? 4/5 | ? |
| SW Demoscopia/La Séptima | 26 Oct–10 Nov 2026 | ? | ? | ? 15 | ? 13 | | ? 6 | ? 0 | ? 0 | – | ? 4 | ? |
| SW Demoscopia/La Séptima | 26 Oct–9 Nov 2026 | ? | ? | ? 15 | ? 11 | | ? 8 | ? 0 | ? 0 | – | ? 4 | ? |
| SW Demoscopia/La Séptima | 26 Oct–8 Nov 2026 | ? | ? | ? 15 | ? 11 | | ? 8 | ? 0 | ? 0 | – | ? 4 | ? |
| SocioMétrica/El Español | 1 Sep–8 Nov 2026 | ? | ? | ? 17 | ? 9 | | ? 9 | ? 0 | ? 0 | – | ? 3 | ? |
| SW Demoscopia/La Séptima | 26 Oct–7 Nov 2026 | ? | ? | ? 15 | ? 11 | | ? 8 | ? 0 | ? 0 | – | ? 4 | ? |
| SW Demoscopia/La Séptima | 26 Oct–6 Nov 2026 | ? | ? | ? 15 | ? 11 | | ? 8 | ? 0 | ? 0 | – | ? 4 | ? |
| GAD3/Vocento | 3–5 Nov 2026 | ? | ? | ? 16 | ? 9 | | ? 8 | ? 1 | ? 0 | – | ? 4 | ? |
| SW Demoscopia/La Séptima | 26 Oct–5 Nov 2026 | ? | ? | ? 15 | ? 11 | | ? 8 | ? 0 | ? 0 | – | ? 4 | ? |
| SW Demoscopia/La Séptima | 26 Oct–4 Nov 2026 | ? | ? | ? 15 | ? 11 | | ? 8 | ? 0 | ? 0 | – | ? 4 | ? |
| CIS | 7–30 Oct 2026 | 4,744 | ? | ? 12/14 | ? 12/14 | | ? 6/8 | ? 0/1 | ? 0 | – | ? 4/5 | Tie |
| Target Point/Justice Europe | 16–19 Oct 2026 | 1,204 | ? | ? 14 | ? 9 | | ? 7 | ? 0 | – | 7.5; 3 | ? 5 | ? |
| DYM/Justice Europe | 1–8 Oct 2026 | 1,113 | ? | 33.8; 14 | 22.7; 9 | 9.2; 3 | 16.5; 6 | 2.1; 0 | – | 12.5; 5 | – | 10.1 |
| Sigma Dos/El Mundo | 1–8 Oct 2026 | ? | ? | ? 16 | ? 9 | ? 3 | ? 9 | ? 1 | ? 0 | – | – | ? |
| NC Report/Justice Europe | 6–23 Jul 2026 | 1,200 | 66.0 | 31.8; 12 | 26.0; 10 | 13.1; 5 | 15.9; 6 | | – | 11.4; 4 | – | 5.8 |
| Sigma Dos/El Mundo | 30 Oct–6 Nov 2025 | ? | ? | ? 17 | ? 9 | ? 3 | ? 7 | ? 1 | ? 0 | – | – | ? |
| Sigma Dos/El Mundo | 17 Sep–1 Oct 2025 | ? | ? | ? 17 | ? 9 | ? 3 | ? 7 | ? 1 | ? 0 | – | – | ? |
| Sigma Dos/El Mundo | 20–28 Aug 2025 | ? | ? | ? 17 | ? 9 | ? 4 | ? 6 | ? 1 | ? 0 | – | – | ? |
| Sigma Dos/El Mundo | 21–30 Jul 2025 | ? | ? | ? 17 | ? 9 | ? 4 | ? 6 | ? 1 | ? 0 | – | – | ? |
| Sigma Dos/El Mundo | 20–27 Jun 2025 | ? | ? | ? 18 | ? 8 | ? 3 | ? 6 | ? 2 | ? 0 | – | – | ? |
| Sigma Dos/El Mundo | 21 Apr–28 May 2025 | ? | ? | ? 17 | ? 10 | ? 3 | ? 5 | ? 2 | ? 0 | – | – | ? |
| Sigma Dos/El Mundo | 4–15 Apr 2025 | ? | ? | ? 17 | ? 10 | ? 3 | ? 5 | ? 2 | ? 0 | – | – | ? |
| Sigma Dos/El Mundo | 24 Feb–7 Mar 2025 | ? | ? | ? 17 | ? 10 | ? 2 | ? 5 | ? 2 | ? 1 | – | – | ? |
| Sigma Dos/El Mundo | 24–31 Jan 2025 | ? | ? | ? 17 | ? 9 | ? 3 | ? 6 | ? 1 | ? 1 | – | – | ? |
| Sigma Dos/El Mundo | 13–26 Dec 2024 | ? | ? | ? 17 | ? 9 | ? 3 | ? 5 | ? 2 | ? 1 | – | – | ? |
| Sigma Dos/El Mundo | 20–27 Sep 2024 | ? | ? | ? 18 | ? 10 | ? 3 | ? 4 | ? 1 | ? 1 | – | – | ? |
| 2024 EP election | 9 Jun 2024 | —N/a | 52.5 | 40.7 (17) | 28.2 (11) | 5.8 (2) | 10.7 (4) | 4.5 (1) | 5.1 (2) | 0.1 (0) | – | 12.5 |
| 2023 general election | 23 Jul 2023 | —N/a | 69.7 | 40.5; 16 | 27.8; 10 | 15.5; 6 | 14.0; 5 | | – | – | – | 12.7 |

=== Murcia ===
| Polling firm/Commissioner | Fieldwork date | Sample size | Turnout | PP | PSOE | Vox | Sumar | Podemos | SALF | FA | Lead |
|---|---|---|---|---|---|---|---|---|---|---|---|
| SocioMétrica/El Español | 1 Sep–15 Nov 2026 | ? | ? | ? 5 | ? 2 | ? 3 | | ? 0 | ? 0 | ? 0 | ? |
| SW Demoscopia/La Séptima | 26 Oct–15 Nov 2026 | ? | ? | ? 4 | ? 2/3 | ? 3/4 | | ? 0 | ? 0 | ? 0 | ? |
| SW Demoscopia/La Séptima | 26 Oct–14 Nov 2026 | ? | ? | ? 4 | ? 2/3 | ? 3/4 | | ? 0 | ? 0 | ? 0 | ? |
| Sondaxe/La Voz de Galicia | 9–13 Nov 2026 | ? | ? | ? 4 | ? 2 | ? 4 | | ? 0 | ? 0 | ? 0 | Tie |
| Sigma Dos/El Mundo | 3–13 Nov 2026 | ? | ? | ? 4 | ? 2 | ? 4 | | ? 0 | ? 0 | ? 0 | Tie |
| SW Demoscopia/La Séptima | 26 Oct–13 Nov 2026 | ? | ? | ? 4 | ? 2/3 | ? 3/4 | | ? 0 | ? 0 | ? 0 | ? |
| SW Demoscopia/La Séptima | 26 Oct–12 Nov 2026 | ? | ? | ? 4 | ? 2/3 | ? 3/4 | | ? 0 | ? 0 | ? 0 | ? |
| OBEDE/UCAM | 9–11 Nov 2026 | 800 | 65.9 | 38.3; 4 | 23.3; 3 | 29.4; 3 | | 1.0; 0 | – | 4.7; 0 | 8.9 |
| SW Demoscopia/La Séptima | 26 Oct–11 Nov 2026 | ? | ? | ? 4 | ? 2/3 | ? 3/4 | | ? 0 | ? 0 | ? 0 | ? |
| SocioMétrica/El Español | 1 Sep–8 Nov 2026 | ? | ? | ? 5 | ? 2 | ? 3 | | ? 0 | ? 0 | ? 0 | ? |
| GAD3/Vocento | 3–5 Nov 2026 | ? | ? | ? 5 | ? 2 | ? 3 | | ? 0 | ? 0 | ? 0 | ? |
| CIS | 7–30 Oct 2026 | 1,216 | ? | ? 3/4 | ? 3/4 | ? 2/3 | | ? 0 | ? 0 | ? 0/1 | Tie |
| Sigma Dos/El Mundo | 1–8 Oct 2026 | ? | ? | ? 5 | ? 2 | ? 3 | ? 0 | ? 0 | ? 0 | – | ? |
| Sigma Dos/La 7 | 18–21 May 2026 | 1,000 | ? | ? 5 | ? 2/3 | ? 2/3 | – | – | – | – | ? |
| OBEDE/UCAM | 13–28 Apr 2026 | 800 | ? | 41.4 | 28.8 | 22.4 | 1.7 | 3.2 | – | – | 12.6 |
| Sigma Dos/El Mundo | 30 Oct–6 Nov 2025 | ? | ? | ? 5 | ? 2 | ? 3 | ? 0 | ? 0 | ? 0 | – | ? |
| Sigma Dos/El Mundo | 17 Sep–1 Oct 2025 | ? | ? | ? 5 | ? 2 | ? 3 | ? 0 | ? 0 | ? 0 | – | ? |
| Sigma Dos/El Mundo | 20–28 Aug 2025 | ? | ? | ? 5 | ? 2 | ? 3 | ? 0 | ? 0 | ? 0 | – | ? |
| Sigma Dos/El Mundo | 21–30 Jul 2025 | ? | ? | ? 5 | ? 2 | ? 3 | ? 0 | ? 0 | ? 0 | – | ? |
| Sigma Dos/El Mundo | 20–27 Jun 2025 | ? | ? | ? 5 | ? 2 | ? 3 | ? 0 | ? 0 | ? 0 | – | ? |
| Sigma Dos/El Mundo | 21 Apr–28 May 2025 | ? | ? | ? 5 | ? 2 | ? 3 | ? 0 | ? 0 | ? 0 | – | ? |
| OBEDE/UCAM | 29 Apr–19 May 2025 | 800 | 64.9 | 45.5; 5 | 24.0; 3 | 19.9; 2 | 4.8; 0 | 4.8; 0 | – | – | 21.5 |
| Sigma Dos/El Mundo | 4–15 Apr 2025 | ? | ? | ? 5 | ? 3 | ? 2 | ? 0 | ? 0 | ? 0 | – | ? |
| Sigma Dos/El Mundo | 24 Feb–7 Mar 2025 | ? | ? | ? 5 | ? 2 | ? 3 | ? 0 | ? 0 | ? 0 | – | ? |
| Sigma Dos/El Mundo | 24–31 Jan 2025 | ? | ? | ? 5 | ? 2 | ? 3 | ? 0 | ? 0 | ? 0 | – | ? |
| Sigma Dos/El Mundo | 13–26 Dec 2024 | ? | ? | ? 5 | ? 2 | ? 3 | ? 0 | ? 0 | ? 0 | – | ? |
| Sigma Dos/El Mundo | 20–27 Sep 2024 | ? | ? | ? 5 | ? 3 | ? 2 | ? 0 | ? 0 | ? 0 | – | ? |
| Sigma Dos/La 7 TV | 2–11 Sep 2024 | 1,004 | ? | 44.2; 5/6 | 21.6; 2/3 | 18.5; 2 | 4.7; 0 | 4.1; 0 | 4.1; 0 | – | 22.6 |
| 2024 EP election | 9 Jun 2024 | —N/a | 46.8 | 42.9 (5) | 25.1 (3) | 15.9 (2) | 3.3 (0) | 2.4 (0) | 6.6 (0) | – | 17.8 |
| OBEDE/UCAM | 4–14 Dec 2023 | 800 | 65.2 | 44.4; 5 | 23.8; 2 | 21.9; 2 | 8.1; 1 | | – | – | 20.6 |
| 2023 general election | 23 Jul 2023 | —N/a | 68.7 | 41.2; 4 | 25.3; 3 | 21.8; 2 | 9.6; 1 | | – | – | 15.9 |

=== Navarre ===
| Polling firm/Commissioner | Fieldwork date | Sample size | Turnout | PSOE | EH Bildu | PP | UPN | Sumar | Vox | GBai | Podemos | FA | Lead |
|---|---|---|---|---|---|---|---|---|---|---|---|---|---|
| SocioMétrica/El Español | 1 Sep–15 Nov 2026 | ? | ? | ? 2 | ? 1 | ? 2 | (Note: Within PP.) | | ? 0 | ? 0 | ? 0 | ? 0 | Tie |
| SW Demoscopia/La Séptima | 26 Oct–15 Nov 2026 | ? | ? | ? 2 | ? 1 | ? 2 | | | ? 0 | ? 0 | ? 0 | ? 0 | Tie |
| SW Demoscopia/La Séptima | 26 Oct–14 Nov 2026 | ? | ? | ? 2 | ? 1 | ? 2 | | | ? 0 | ? 0 | ? 0 | ? 0 | Tie |
| Sondaxe/La Voz de Galicia | 9–13 Nov 2026 | ? | ? | ? 1 | ? 2 | ? 2 | | | ? 0 | ? 0 | ? 0 | ? 0 | Tie |
| Sigma Dos/El Mundo | 3–13 Nov 2026 | ? | ? | ? 2 | ? 1 | ? 2 | | | ? 0 | ? 0 | ? 0 | ? 0 | Tie |
| SW Demoscopia/La Séptima | 26 Oct–13 Nov 2026 | ? | ? | ? 2 | ? 1 | ? 2 | | | ? 0 | ? 0 | ? 0 | ? 0 | Tie |
| SW Demoscopia/La Séptima | 26 Oct–12 Nov 2026 | ? | ? | ? 2 | ? 1 | ? 2 | | | ? 0 | ? 0 | ? 0 | ? 0 | Tie |
| SW Demoscopia/La Séptima | 26 Oct–11 Nov 2026 | ? | ? | ? 2 | ? 1 | ? 2 | | | ? 0 | ? 0 | ? 0 | ? 0 | Tie |
| SW Demoscopia/La Séptima | 26 Oct–10 Nov 2026 | ? | ? | ? 2 | ? 1 | ? 2 | | | ? 0 | ? 0 | ? 0 | ? 0 | Tie |
| SW Demoscopia/La Séptima | 26 Oct–9 Nov 2026 | ? | ? | ? 2 | ? 1 | ? 2 | | | ? 0 | ? 0 | ? 0 | ? 0 | Tie |
| SW Demoscopia/La Séptima | 26 Oct–8 Nov 2026 | ? | ? | ? 2 | ? 1 | ? 2 | | | ? 0 | ? 0 | ? 0 | ? 0 | Tie |
| SocioMétrica/El Español | 1 Sep–8 Nov 2026 | ? | ? | ? 2 | ? 1 | ? 2 | | | ? 0 | ? 0 | ? 0 | ? 0 | Tie |
| SW Demoscopia/La Séptima | 26 Oct–7 Nov 2026 | ? | ? | ? 2 | ? 1 | ? 2 | | | ? 0 | ? 0 | ? 0 | ? 0 | Tie |
| SW Demoscopia/La Séptima | 26 Oct–6 Nov 2026 | ? | ? | ? 2 | ? 1 | ? 2 | | | ? 0 | ? 0 | ? 0 | ? 0 | Tie |
| GAD3/Vocento | 3–5 Nov 2026 | ? | ? | ? 2 | ? 1 | ? 2 | | | ? 0 | ? 0 | ? 0 | ? 0 | Tie |
| EM-Analytics/Electomanía | 28–30 Oct 2026 | ? | ? | 25.5; 2 | 19.0; 1 | 31.6; 2 | | | 12.5; 0 | 1.5; 0 | 2.1; 0 | 6.6; 0 | 6.1 |
| CIS | 7–30 Oct 2026 | 659 | ? | ? 2 | ? 1/2 | ? 1/2 | | | ? 0/1 | ? 0 | ? 0 | ? 0 | ? |
| Sigma Dos/El Mundo | 1–8 Oct 2026 | ? | ? | ? 2 | ? 1 | ? 1 | ? 1 | ? 0 | ? 0 | ? 0 | ? 0 | – | ? |
| Sigma Dos/El Mundo | 30 Oct–6 Nov 2025 | ? | ? | ? 2 | ? 1 | ? 1 | ? 1 | ? 0 | ? 0 | ? 0 | ? 0 | – | ? |
| Sigma Dos/El Mundo | 17 Sep–1 Oct 2025 | ? | ? | ? 2 | ? 1 | ? 1 | ? 1 | ? 0 | ? 0 | ? 0 | ? 0 | – | ? |
| Gizaker/EiTB | 15–23 Sep 2025 | 400 | ? | 23.6; 2 | 19.6; 1 | 17.7; 1 | 14.7; 1 | 11.6; 0 | 7.0; 0 | 3.3; 0 | – | – | 4.0 |
| Sigma Dos/El Mundo | 20–28 Aug 2025 | ? | ? | ? 2 | ? 1 | ? 1 | ? 1 | ? 0 | ? 0 | ? 0 | ? 0 | – | ? |
| Sigma Dos/El Mundo | 21–30 Jul 2025 | ? | ? | ? 2 | ? 1 | ? 1 | ? 1 | ? 0 | ? 0 | ? 0 | ? 0 | – | ? |
| Sigma Dos/El Mundo | 20–27 Jun 2025 | ? | ? | ? 2 | ? 1 | ? 1 | ? 1 | ? 0 | ? 0 | ? 0 | ? 0 | – | ? |
| Sigma Dos/El Mundo | 21 Apr–28 May 2025 | ? | ? | ? 2 | ? 1 | ? 1 | ? 1 | ? 0 | ? 0 | ? 0 | ? 0 | – | ? |
| Sigma Dos/El Mundo | 4–15 Apr 2025 | ? | ? | ? 2 | ? 1 | ? 1 | ? 1 | ? 0 | ? 0 | ? 0 | ? 0 | – | ? |
| Sigma Dos/El Mundo | 24 Feb–7 Mar 2025 | ? | ? | ? 2 | ? 1 | ? 1 | ? 1 | ? 0 | ? 0 | ? 0 | ? 0 | – | ? |
| Sigma Dos/El Mundo | 24–31 Jan 2025 | ? | ? | ? 2 | ? 1 | ? 1 | ? 1 | ? 0 | ? 0 | ? 0 | ? 0 | – | ? |
| Sigma Dos/El Mundo | 13–26 Dec 2024 | ? | ? | ? 2 | ? 1 | ? 1 | ? 1 | ? 0 | ? 0 | ? 0 | ? 0 | – | ? |
| Sigma Dos/El Mundo | 20–27 Sep 2024 | ? | ? | ? 2 | ? 1 | ? 1 | ? 1 | ? 0 | ? 0 | ? 0 | ? 0 | – | ? |
| 2024 EP election | 9 Jun 2024 | —N/a | 50.0 | 28.8 (2) | 18.7 (1) | 28.0 (2) | – | 3.9 (0) | 6.7 (0) | 3.2 (0) | 3.2 (0) | – | 0.8 |
| 2023 general election | 23 Jul 2023 | —N/a | 66.4 | 27.4; 2 | 17.2; 1 | 16.7; 1 | 15.3; 1 | 12.8; 0 | 5.7; 0 | 2.9; 0 | | – | 10.2 |

=== Valencian Community ===
| Polling firm/Commissioner | Fieldwork date | Sample size | Turnout | PP | PSOE | Vox | Sumar | Podemos | Compromís | SALF | FV | Lead |
|---|---|---|---|---|---|---|---|---|---|---|---|---|
| SocioMétrica/El Español | 1 Sep–15 Nov 2026 | ? | ? | ? 12 | ? 10 | ? 8 | (Note: Within FV.) | | | ? 0 | ? 3 | ? |
| SW Demoscopia/La Séptima | 26 Oct–15 Nov 2026 | ? | ? | ? 11/12 | ? 11/13 | ? 6/8 | | | | ? 0 | ? 2/3 | ? |
| SW Demoscopia/La Séptima | 26 Oct–14 Nov 2026 | ? | ? | ? 11/12 | ? 11/13 | ? 6/8 | | | | ? 0 | ? 1/3 | ? |
| Sondaxe/La Voz de Galicia | 9–13 Nov 2026 | ? | ? | ? 13 | ? 10 | ? 8 | | | | ? 0 | ? 2 | ? |
| Sigma Dos/El Mundo | 3–13 Nov 2026 | ? | ? | ? 11/12 | ? 10 | ? 7/8 | | | | ? 0 | ? 3/5 | ? |
| SW Demoscopia/La Séptima | 26 Oct–13 Nov 2026 | ? | ? | ? 11/12 | ? 11/13 | ? 7/8 | | | | ? 0 | ? 1/3 | ? |
| SW Demoscopia/La Séptima | 26 Oct–12 Nov 2026 | ? | ? | ? 11/12 | ? 11/13 | ? 7/8 | | | | ? 0 | ? 1/3 | ? |
| SW Demoscopia/La Séptima | 26 Oct–11 Nov 2026 | ? | ? | ? 11/12 | ? 11/13 | ? 7/8 | | | | ? 0 | ? 1/3 | ? |
| SW Demoscopia/La Séptima | 26 Oct–10 Nov 2026 | ? | ? | ? 11 | ? 12 | ? 8 | | | | ? 0 | ? 2 | ? |
| SW Demoscopia/La Séptima | 26 Oct–9 Nov 2026 | ? | ? | ? 11 | ? 12 | ? 8 | | | | ? 0 | ? 2 | ? |
| SW Demoscopia/La Séptima | 26 Oct–8 Nov 2026 | ? | ? | ? 11 | ? 12 | ? 7 | | | | ? 0 | ? 3 | ? |
| SocioMétrica/El Español | 1 Sep–8 Nov 2026 | ? | ? | ? 12 | ? 11 | ? 8 | | | | ? 0 | ? 2 | ? |
| SW Demoscopia/La Séptima | 26 Oct–7 Nov 2026 | ? | ? | ? 11 | ? 12 | ? 7 | | | | ? 0 | ? 3 | ? |
| SW Demoscopia/La Séptima | 26 Oct–6 Nov 2026 | ? | ? | ? 11 | ? 12 | ? 7 | | | | ? 0 | ? 3 | ? |
| GAD3/Vocento | 3–5 Nov 2026 | ? | ? | ? 12 | ? 8 | ? 8 | | | | ? 0 | ? 5 | ? |
| SW Demoscopia/La Séptima | 26 Oct–5 Nov 2026 | ? | ? | ? 11 | ? 12 | ? 7 | | | | ? 0 | ? 3 | ? |
| SW Demoscopia/La Séptima | 26 Oct–4 Nov 2026 | ? | ? | ? 11 | ? 12 | ? 7 | | | | ? 0 | ? 3 | ? |
| CIS | 7–30 Oct 2026 | 3,981 | ? | ? 7/11 | ? 10/13 | ? 6/8 | | | | ? 0 | ? 4/7 | ? |
| SyM Consulting/EPDA | 6–16 Oct 2026 | ? | ? | 33.7; 11/12 | 29.4; 9/12 | 18.0; 6 | | | | – | 16.8; 4/6 | 4.3 |
| Sigma Dos/El Mundo | 1–8 Oct 2026 | ? | ? | ? 12 | ? 10 | ? 9 | ? 2 | ? 0 | | ? 0 | – | ? |
| SocioMétrica/El Español | 1–7 Oct 2026 | 1,100 | ? | 35.3; 13 | 25.7; 10 | 22.4; 8 | – | 3.3; 0 | 8.2; 2 | 2.7; 0 | – | 9.6 |
| Sigma Dos/El Mundo | 30 Oct–6 Nov 2025 | ? | ? | ? 13 | ? 10 | ? 7 | ? 3 | ? 0 | | ? 0 | – | ? |
| GAD3/ABC | 13–22 Oct 2025 | 1,013 | ? | 30.7; 12 | 28.5; 11 | 21.7; 8 | 6.1; 1 | 6.4; 0 | 2.9; 1 | – | – | 2.2 |
| Sigma Dos/El Mundo | 17 Sep–1 Oct 2025 | ? | ? | ? 13 | ? 10 | ? 7 | ? 3 | ? 0 | | ? 0 | – | ? |
| Sigma Dos/El Mundo | 20–28 Aug 2025 | ? | ? | ? 13 | ? 11 | ? 6 | ? 3 | ? 0 | | ? 0 | – | ? |
| Sigma Dos/El Mundo | 21–30 Jul 2025 | ? | ? | ? 13 | ? 11 | ? 6 | ? 3 | ? 0 | | ? 0 | – | ? |
| Demoscopia y Servicios | 22–23 Jul 2025 | ? | 67.0 | 32.4; 12 | 27.6; 10 | 20.4; 8 | 13.7; 3 | – | | – | – | 4.8 |
| Sigma Dos/El Mundo | 20–27 Jun 2025 | ? | ? | ? 13 | ? 11 | ? 6 | ? 3 | ? 0 | | ? 0 | – | ? |
| Sigma Dos/El Mundo | 21 Apr–28 May 2025 | ? | ? | ? 13 | ? 11 | ? 6 | ? 3 | ? 0 | | ? 0 | – | ? |
| Sigma Dos/El Mundo | 4–15 Apr 2025 | ? | ? | ? 14 | ? 11 | ? 6 | ? 2 | ? 0 | | ? 0 | – | ? |
| Sigma Dos/El Mundo | 24 Feb–7 Mar 2025 | ? | ? | ? 13 | ? 11 | ? 6 | ? 2 | ? 1 | | ? 0 | – | ? |
| Sigma Dos/El Mundo | 24–31 Jan 2025 | ? | ? | ? 14 | ? 11 | ? 6 | ? 2 | ? 0 | | ? 0 | – | ? |
| Sigma Dos/El Mundo | 13–26 Dec 2024 | ? | ? | ? 13 | ? 12 | ? 6 | ? 2 | ? 0 | | ? 0 | – | ? |
| ElectoPanel/Electomanía | 29 Oct–8 Nov 2024 | 776 | ? | 30.2 | 26.7 | 18.6 | 12.5 | 5.6 | | 3.4 | – | 3.5 |
| Sigma Dos/El Mundo | 20–27 Sep 2024 | ? | ? | ? 15 | ? 12 | ? 3 | ? 3 | ? 0 | | ? 0 | – | ? |
| 2024 EP election | 9 Jun 2024 | —N/a | 52.0 | 35.8 (15) | 31.5 (13) | 11.5 (3) | 7.7 (1) | 3.0 (0) | | 5.8 (1) | – | 4.3 |
| 2023 general election | 23 Jul 2023 | —N/a | 71.5 | 34.9; 13 | 32.1; 11 | 15.6; 5 | 15.2; 4 | | | – | – | 2.8 |

== Constituencies ==
=== A Coruña ===
| Polling firm/Commissioner | Fieldwork date | Sample size | Turnout | PP | PSdeG–PSOE | Sumar | BNG | Vox | FA | Lead |
|---|---|---|---|---|---|---|---|---|---|---|
| Sondaxe/La Voz de Galicia | 16–20 Nov 2026 | 300 | ? | 39.6; 4 | 30.5; 3 | | 15.5; 1 | 7.3; 0 | ? 0 | 9.1 |
| Sondaxe/La Voz de Galicia | 15–19 Nov 2026 | 300 | ? | 41.4; 4 | 29.9; 3 | | 15.3; 1 | 8.4; 0 | ? 0 | 11.5 |
| Sondaxe/La Voz de Galicia | 14–18 Nov 2026 | 300 | ? | 41.3; 4 | 27.3; 2 | | 15.8; 1 | 9.8; 1 | ? 0 | 14.0 |
| Sondaxe/La Voz de Galicia | 13–17 Nov 2026 | 300 | ? | 40.3; 4 | 26.1; 2 | | 17.4; 1 | 10.2; 1 | ? 0 | 14.2 |
| Sondaxe/La Voz de Galicia | 12–16 Nov 2026 | 300 | ? | 40.8; 4 | 26.3; 2 | | 15.4; 1 | 11.1; 1 | ? 0 | 14.5 |
| Sondaxe/La Voz de Galicia | 11–15 Nov 2026 | 300 | ? | 40.8; 4 | 25.1; 2 | | 16.1; 1 | 10.3; 1 | ? 0 | 15.7 |
| Sondaxe/La Voz de Galicia | 10–14 Nov 2026 | 300 | ? | 40.1; 4 | 22.4; 2 | | 18.0; 1 | 10.6; 1 | ? 0 | 17.7 |
| Sondaxe/La Voz de Galicia | 9–13 Nov 2026 | 300 | 67.4 | 38.5; 4 | 23.4; 2 | | 18.3; 1 | 10.4; 1 | <5.0; 0 | 15.1 |
| Sondaxe/La Voz de Galicia | 5–13 Feb 2025 | ? | ? | 41.5; 4 | 26.2; 3 | 8.6; 0 | 14.3; 1 | – | – | 15.3 |
| Sondaxe/La Voz de Galicia | 24 Sep–2 Oct 2024 | ? | ? | 43.7; 4 | 22.5; 2 | 10.6; 1 | 15.5; 1 | – | – | 21.2 |
| 2024 EP election | 9 Jun 2024 | —N/a | 42.7 | 43.2 (4) | 26.0 (3) | 2.2 (0) | 17.1 (1) | 4.5 (0) | – | 17.2 |
| 2024 regional election | 18 Feb 2024 | —N/a | 56.9 | 47.7 (4) | 13.0 (1) | 2.3 (0) | 32.5 (3) | 2.5 (0) | – | 15.2 |
| Sondaxe/La Voz de Galicia | 29 Dec–4 Jan 2024 | ? | ? | ? 4 | ? 2 | ? 1 | ? 1 | – | – | ? |
| Sondaxe/La Voz de Galicia | 18–26 Oct 2023 | ? | ? | 43.7; 4 | 26.8; 2 | 11.7; 1 | 10.0; 1 | – | – | 16.9 |
| 2023 general election | 23 Jul 2023 | —N/a | 62.9 | 43.1; 4 | 28.2; 2 | 12.2; 1 | 10.0; 1 | 5.1; 0 | – | 14.9 |

=== Álava ===
| Polling firm/Commissioner | Fieldwork date | Sample size | Turnout | PSE–EE (PSOE) | EH Bildu | PP | PNV | Sumar | Vox | Podemos | FA | Lead |
|---|---|---|---|---|---|---|---|---|---|---|---|---|
| Ikerfel/GPS | 20–23 Oct 2026 | 800 | 68.7 | 27.9; 1 | 23.7; 1 | 19.7; 1 | 15.1; 1 | | 4.7; 0 | 2.7; 0 | 4.3; 0 | 4.2 |
| 2024 EP election | 9 Jun 2024 | —N/a | 48.4 | 28.8 (1) | 21.4 (1) | 17.6 (1) | 15.2 (1) | 3.8 (0) | 3.9 (0) | 3.6 (0) | – | 7.4 |
| 2023 general election | 23 Jul 2023 | —N/a | 65.5 | 27.7; 1 | 19.5; 1 | 17.9; 1 | 16.6; 1 | 12.7; 0 | 3.9; 0 | – | – | 8.2 |

=== Alicante ===
| Polling firm/Commissioner | Fieldwork date | Sample size | Turnout | PP | PSOE | Vox | Sumem per Guanyar | Podemos | Compromís | SALF | FV | Lead |
|---|---|---|---|---|---|---|---|---|---|---|---|---|
| SyM Consulting/EPDA | 6–16 Oct 2026 | ? | ? | 33.1; 4 | 26.2; 3/4 | 17.3; 2 | | | | – | 21.4; 2/3 | 6.9 |
| 2024 EP election | 9 Jun 2024 | —N/a | 48.4 | 38.2 (6) | 31.3 (5) | 11.7 (1) | 5.6 (0) | 2.6 (0) | | 6.0 (0) | – | 6.9 |
| 2023 general election | 23 Jul 2023 | —N/a | 69.6 | 36.7; 5 | 32.0; 4 | 16.3; 2 | 12.9; 1 | | | – | – | 4.7 |

=== Almería ===
| Polling firm/Commissioner | Fieldwork date | Sample size | Turnout | PP | PSOE | Vox | Sumar | Podemos | Adelante Andalucía (2021) | SALF | FA | Lead |
|---|---|---|---|---|---|---|---|---|---|---|---|---|
| Social Data/Grupo Viva | 13 Oct–14 Nov 2026 | ? | ? | 37.5; 2/3 | 26.5; 2 | 25.4; 1/2 | | – | 2.9; 0 | – | 2.7; 0 | 11.0 |
| 2026 regional election | 17 May 2026 | —N/a | 57.0 | 42.7 (3) | 21.7 (1) | 23.2 (2) | 3.8 (0) | | 3.1 (0) | 2.9 (0) | – | 19.5 |
| 2024 EP election | 9 Jun 2024 | —N/a | 41.3 | 42.8 (3) | 26.8 (2) | 15.2 (1) | 2.8 (0) | 1.8 (0) | – | 7.0 (0) | – | 16.0 |
| 2023 general election | 23 Jul 2023 | —N/a | 66.6 | 40.9; 3 | 29.0; 2 | 21.3; 1 | 6.7; 0 | | – | – | – | 11.9 |

=== Biscay ===
| Polling firm/Commissioner | Fieldwork date | Sample size | Turnout | PNV | PSE–EE (PSOE) | EH Bildu | PP | Sumar | Vox | Podemos | FA | Lead |
|---|---|---|---|---|---|---|---|---|---|---|---|---|
| Ikerfel/GPS | 20–23 Oct 2026 | 1,485 | 69.2 | 24.7; 2 | 25.0; 2 | 25.9; 3 | 13.0; 1 | | 4.8; 0 | 1.1; 0 | 4.1; 0 | 0.9 |
| 2024 EP election | 9 Jun 2024 | —N/a | 49.5 | 25.5 (2) | 26.5 (3) | 22.7 (2) | 11.7 (1) | 3.2 (0) | 2.7 (0) | 3.2 (0) | – | 1.0 |
| 2023 general election | 23 Jul 2023 | —N/a | 65.2 | 26.9; 2 | 25.8; 2 | 20.6; 2 | 11.6; 1 | 10.9; 1 | 2.6; 0 | – | – | 1.1 |

=== Cádiz ===
| Polling firm/Commissioner | Fieldwork date | Sample size | Turnout | PP | PSOE | Vox | Sumar | Adelante Andalucía (2021) | Podemos | SALF | FA | Lead |
|---|---|---|---|---|---|---|---|---|---|---|---|---|
| Social Data/Grupo Viva | 13 Oct–14 Nov 2026 | ? | ? | 29.7; 2/3 | 27.7; 2/3 | 17.2; 1/2 | | 12.9; 1 | – | – | 5.0; 0 | 2.0 |
| EM-Analytics/Electomanía | 1–6 Nov 2026 | ? | ? | 27.7; 2/3 | 25.2; 2/3 | 16.2; 1/2 | | 17.5; 1/2 | 1.8; 0 | 1.8; 0 | 9.5; 1 | 2.5 |
| 2026 regional election | 17 May 2026 | —N/a | 58.4 | 38.9 (5) | 20.2 (2) | 13.0 (1) | 5.3 (0) | 14.3 (1) | | 2.8 (0) | – | 18.7 |
| 2024 EP election | 9 Jun 2024 | —N/a | 38.6 | 36.8 (4) | 31.8 (4) | 10.8 (1) | 5.6 (0) | – | 2.9 (0) | 6.5 (0) | – | 5.0 |
| 2023 general election | 23 Jul 2023 | —N/a | 63.3 | 34.8; 4 | 33.2; 3 | 15.2; 1 | 12.9; 1 | 1.4; 0 | | – | – | 1.6 |

=== Castellón ===
| Polling firm/Commissioner | Fieldwork date | Sample size | Turnout | PP | PSOE | Vox | Sumem per Guanyar | Podemos | Compromís | SALF | FV | Lead |
|---|---|---|---|---|---|---|---|---|---|---|---|---|
| SyM Consulting/EPDA | 6–16 Oct 2026 | ? | ? | 36.7; 2 | 30.6; 1/2 | 18.0; 1 | | | | – | 12.8; 0/1 | 6.1 |
| 2024 EP election | 9 Jun 2024 | —N/a | 52.4 | 36.1 (3) | 31.9 (2) | 11.8 (0) | 7.3 (0) | 2.7 (0) | | 5.1 (0) | – | 4.2 |
| 2023 general election | 23 Jul 2023 | —N/a | 72.3 | 35.2; 2 | 32.6; 2 | 15.9; 1 | 14.3; 0 | | | – | – | 2.6 |

=== Córdoba ===
| Polling firm/Commissioner | Fieldwork date | Sample size | Turnout | PP | PSOE | Vox | Sumar | Podemos | Adelante Andalucía (2021) | SALF | FA | Lead |
|---|---|---|---|---|---|---|---|---|---|---|---|---|
| Social Data/Grupo Viva | 13 Oct–14 Nov 2026 | ? | ? | 35.2; 3 | 28.1; 2 | 16.8; 1 | | – | 7.8; 0 | – | 5.6; 0 | 7.1 |
| 2026 regional election | 17 May 2026 | —N/a | 66.9 | 43.2 (3) | 22.3 (2) | 12.6 (1) | 8.8 (0) | | 8.3 (0) | 2.1 (0) | – | 20.9 |
| 2024 EP election | 9 Jun 2024 | —N/a | 47.3 | 39.7 (3) | 31.4 (3) | 10.2 (0) | 6.5 (0) | 2.6 (0) | – | 5.3 (0) | – | 5.0 |
| 2023 general election | 23 Jul 2023 | —N/a | 70.6 | 37.9; 2 | 32.1; 2 | 13.9; 1 | 13.7; 1 | | – | – | – | 5.8 |

=== Gipuzkoa ===
| Polling firm/Commissioner | Fieldwork date | Sample size | Turnout | EH Bildu | PSE–EE (PSOE) | PNV | Sumar | PP | Vox | Podemos | FA | Lead |
|---|---|---|---|---|---|---|---|---|---|---|---|---|
| Ikerfel/GPS | 20–23 Oct 2026 | 1,200 | 68.0 | 36.9; 3 | 22.8; 2 | 20.3; 1 | | 8.8; 0 | 4.8; 0 | 1.5; 0 | 3.6; 0 | 14.1 |
| 2024 EP election | 9 Jun 2024 | —N/a | 47.9 | 34.4 (3) | 24.0 (2) | 20.6 (1) | 3.0 (0) | 8.7 (0) | 2.1 (0) | 3.0 (0) | – | 10.4 |
| 2023 general election | 23 Jul 2023 | —N/a | 64.7 | 31.2; 2 | 23.3; 2 | 22.6; 2 | 10.6; 0 | 8.7; 0 | 2.1; 0 | – | – | 7.9 |

=== Granada ===
| Polling firm/Commissioner | Fieldwork date | Sample size | Turnout | PP | PSOE | Vox | Sumar | Podemos | Adelante Andalucía (2021) | SALF | FA | Lead |
|---|---|---|---|---|---|---|---|---|---|---|---|---|
| Social Data/Grupo Viva | 13 Oct–14 Nov 2026 | ? | ? | 33.9; 3 | 30.0; 2/3 | 19.2; 1/2 | | – | 6.3; 0 | – | 4.7; 0 | 3.9 |
| 2026 regional election | 17 May 2026 | —N/a | 61.8 | 42.4 (4) | 24.3 (2) | 15.1 (1) | 6.5 (0) | | 6.8 (0) | 2.3 (0) | – | 20.9 |
| 2024 EP election | 9 Jun 2024 | —N/a | 45.1 | 38.3 (3) | 32.0 (3) | 11.6 (1) | 4.8 (0) | – | 3.0 (0) | 6.0 (0) | – | 6.3 |
| 2023 general election | 23 Jul 2023 | —N/a | 66.6 | 37.0; 3 | 33.0; 2 | 16.1; 1 | 11.6; 1 | | – | – | – | 4.0 |

=== Las Palmas ===
| Polling firm/Commissioner | Fieldwork date | Sample size | Turnout | PSOE | PP | Vox | Sumar | NCa | CCa | Podemos | SALF | UPC | Lead |
|---|---|---|---|---|---|---|---|---|---|---|---|---|---|
| GCEMOP/Atlántico Hoy | 28 Oct–11 Nov 2026 | ? | ? | 25.0– 26.0; 2/3 | 19.0– 20.0; 2 | 17.0– 18.0; 1/2 | | | 9.0– 10.0; 0/1 | | – | 10.0– 11.0; 1 | 6.0 |
| 2024 EP election | 9 Jun 2024 | —N/a | 37.7 | 31.6 (4) | 30.2 (3) | 12.9 (1) | 4.6 (0) | | 6.5 (0) | 3.4 (0) | 6.8 (0) | – | 1.4 |
| 2023 general election | 23 Jul 2023 | —N/a | 59.5 | 33.2; 3 | 25.9; 3 | 14.6; 1 | 10.3; 1 | 8.0; 0 | 6.3; 0 | | – | – | 7.3 |

=== León ===
| Polling firm/Commissioner | Fieldwork date | Sample size | Turnout | PP | PSOE | Vox | UPL | Sumar | Podemos | SALF | FA | Lead |
|---|---|---|---|---|---|---|---|---|---|---|---|---|
| SyM Consulting/La Nueva Crónica | 6–16 Oct 2026 | 1,020 | ? | 38.7; 2 | 25.9; 1/2 | 15.5; 0/1 | – | – | 10.3; 0 | – | – | 12.8 |
| 2026 regional election | 15 Mar 2026 | —N/a | 56.0 | 28.1 (1) | 28.4 (3) | 16.5 (1) | 20.8 (1) | 1.3 (0) | 0.7 (0) | 1.1 (0) | – | 0.3 |
| 2024 EP election | 9 Jun 2024 | —N/a | 46.4 | 41.7 (2) | 33.8 (2) | 10.3 (0) | – | 2.8 (0) | 2.5 (0) | 4.0 (0) | – | 7.9 |
| 2023 general election | 23 Jul 2023 | —N/a | 65.7 | 36.9; 2 | 33.6; 2 | 12.9; 0 | 8.2; 0 | 6.7; 0 | | – | – | 3.3 |

=== Lugo ===
| Polling firm/Commissioner | Fieldwork date | Sample size | Turnout | PP | PSdeG–PSOE | BNG | Sumar | Vox | FA | Lead |
|---|---|---|---|---|---|---|---|---|---|---|
| Sondaxe/La Voz de Galicia | 16–20 Nov 2026 | 300 | ? | 46.7; 3 | 27.8; 1 | 13.8; 0 | | 7.4; 0 | ? 0 | 18.9 |
| Sondaxe/La Voz de Galicia | 15–19 Nov 2026 | 300 | ? | 46.0; 3 | 28.6; 1 | 12.7; 0 | | 7.7; 0 | ? 0 | 17.4 |
| Sondaxe/La Voz de Galicia | 14–18 Nov 2026 | 300 | ? | 44.6; 2 | 30.2; 2 | 11.8; 0 | | 7.6; 0 | ? 0 | 14.4 |
| Sondaxe/La Voz de Galicia | 13–17 Nov 2026 | 300 | ? | 44.9; 2 | 30.7; 2 | 11.4; 0 | | 8.0; 0 | ? 0 | 14.2 |
| Sondaxe/La Voz de Galicia | 12–16 Nov 2026 | 300 | ? | 43.9; 2 | 29.4; 2 | 9.6; 0 | | 10.4; 0 | ? 0 | 14.5 |
| Sondaxe/La Voz de Galicia | 11–15 Nov 2026 | 300 | ? | 43.4; 2 | 29.6; 2 | 11.4; 0 | | 9.1; 0 | ? 0 | 13.8 |
| Sondaxe/La Voz de Galicia | 10–14 Nov 2026 | 300 | ? | 42.2; 2 | 28.4; 2 | 11.4; 0 | | 10.9; 0 | ? 0 | 13.8 |
| Sondaxe/La Voz de Galicia | 9–13 Nov 2026 | 300 | ? | 42.2; 3 | 27.9; 1 | 10.7; 0 | | 11.8; 0 | 3.2; 0 | 14.3 |
| Sondaxe/La Voz de Galicia | 5–13 Feb 2025 | ? | ? | 49.4; 3 | 24.2; 1 | – | – | – | – | 25.2 |
| Sondaxe/La Voz de Galicia | 24 Sep–2 Oct 2024 | ? | ? | 53.4; 3 | 24.5; 1 | – | – | – | – | 28.9 |
| 2024 EP election | 9 Jun 2024 | —N/a | 40.4 | 49.8 (3) | 25.8 (1) | 12.9 (0) | 1.2 (0) | 4.5 (0) | – | 24.0 |
| 2024 regional election | 18 Feb 2024 | —N/a | 56.2 | 53.3 (3) | 17.3 (0) | 25.0 (0) | 0.6 (1) | 1.9 (0) | – | 28.3 |
| Sondaxe/La Voz de Galicia | 29 Dec–4 Jan 2024 | ? | ? | ? 3 | ? 1 | – | – | – | – | ? |
| Sondaxe/La Voz de Galicia | 18–26 Oct 2023 | ? | ? | 53.6; 3 | 26.3; 1 | – | – | – | – | 27.3 |
| 2023 general election | 23 Jul 2023 | —N/a | 59.4 | 50.2; 3 | 30.3; 1 | 8.7; 0 | 5.2; 0 | 4.4; 0 | – | 19.9 |

=== Melilla ===
| Polling firm/Commissioner | Fieldwork date | Sample size | Turnout | PP | PSOE | Vox | CpM | Sumar | Podemos | SALF | Lead |
|---|---|---|---|---|---|---|---|---|---|---|---|
| GAD3/PP | 27–29 Apr 2026 | 500 | ? | 47.6; 1 | 27.0; 0 | 16.4; 0 | 3.5; 0 | 0.7; 0 | 1.1; 0 | 2.0; 0 | 20.6 |
| 2024 EP election | 9 Jun 2024 | —N/a | 30.1 | 40.0 (1) | 33.7 (0) | 14.1 (0) | – | 1.7 (0) | 1.6 (0) | 5.9 (0) | 6.3 |
| 2023 general election | 23 Jul 2023 | —N/a | 45.2 | 49.2; 1 | 25.4; 0 | 15.9; 0 | 4.7; 0 | 3.0; 0 | | – | 23.8 |

=== Ourense ===
| Polling firm/Commissioner | Fieldwork date | Sample size | Turnout | PP | PSdeG–PSOE | BNG | Sumar | Vox | FA | Lead |
|---|---|---|---|---|---|---|---|---|---|---|
| Sondaxe/La Voz de Galicia | 16–20 Nov 2026 | 300 | ? | 45.2; 3 | 22.6; 1 | 13.5; 0 | | 10.6; 0 | ? 0 | 22.6 |
| Sondaxe/La Voz de Galicia | 15–19 Nov 2026 | 300 | ? | 45.5; 3 | 23.6; 1 | 12.4; 0 | | 11.0; 0 | ? 0 | 21.9 |
| Sondaxe/La Voz de Galicia | 14–18 Nov 2026 | 300 | ? | 46.8; 3 | 25.4; 1 | 11.2; 0 | | 10.4; 0 | ? 0 | 21.4 |
| Sondaxe/La Voz de Galicia | 13–17 Nov 2026 | 300 | ? | 48.3; 3 | 26.6; 1 | 9.3; 0 | | 8.7; 0 | ? 0 | 21.7 |
| Sondaxe/La Voz de Galicia | 12–16 Nov 2026 | 300 | ? | 45.6; 3 | 27.5; 1 | 8.4; 0 | | 10.9; 0 | ? 0 | 18.1 |
| Sondaxe/La Voz de Galicia | 11–15 Nov 2026 | 300 | ? | 46.7; 3 | 27.8; 1 | 8.9; 0 | | 11.7; 0 | ? 0 | 18.9 |
| Sondaxe/La Voz de Galicia | 10–14 Nov 2026 | 300 | ? | 46.3; 3 | 26.3; 1 | 7.9; 0 | | 11.3; 0 | ? 0 | 20.0 |
| Sondaxe/La Voz de Galicia | 9–13 Nov 2026 | 300 | ? | 44.0; 3 | 27.5; 1 | 9.4; 0 | | 11.0; 0 | 5.9; 0 | 16.5 |
| Sondaxe/La Voz de Galicia | 5–13 Feb 2025 | ? | ? | 49.8; 3 | 27.7; 1 | – | – | – | – | 22.1 |
| Sondaxe/La Voz de Galicia | 24 Sep–2 Oct 2024 | ? | ? | 51.5; 3 | 24.9; 1 | – | – | – | – | 26.6 |
| 2024 EP election | 9 Jun 2024 | —N/a | 37.4 | 51.0 (3) | 25.8 (1) | 11.7 (0) | 1.2 (0) | 4.5 (0) | – | 25.2 |
| 2024 regional election | 18 Feb 2024 | —N/a | 50.1 | 50.1 (3) | 12.4 (0) | 0.6 (0) | 25.0 (1) | 1.7 (0) | – | 25.1 |
| Sondaxe/La Voz de Galicia | 29 Dec–4 Jan 2024 | ? | ? | ? 3 | ? 1 | – | – | – | – | ? |
| Sondaxe/La Voz de Galicia | 18–26 Oct 2023 | ? | ? | 49.7; 3 | 29.7; 1 | – | – | – | – | 20.0 |
| 2023 general election | 23 Jul 2023 | —N/a | 52.9 | 50.0; 3 | 30.1; 1 | 8.2; 0 | 5.5; 0 | 4.9; 0 | – | 19.9 |

=== Pontevedra ===
| Polling firm/Commissioner | Fieldwork date | Sample size | Turnout | PP | PSdeG–PSOE | Sumar | BNG | Vox | FA | Lead |
|---|---|---|---|---|---|---|---|---|---|---|
| Sondaxe/La Voz de Galicia | 16–20 Nov 2026 | 300 | ? | 40.6; 4 | 28.5; 2 | | 16.4; 1 | 5.5; 0 | ? 0 | 12.1 |
| Sondaxe/La Voz de Galicia | 15–19 Nov 2026 | 300 | ? | 40.2; 4 | 27.5; 2 | | 16.8; 1 | 6.1; 0 | ? 0 | 12.7 |
| Sondaxe/La Voz de Galicia | 14–18 Nov 2026 | 300 | ? | 41.5; 4 | 24.5; 2 | | 16.5; 1 | 5.9; 0 | ? 0 | 17.0 |
| Sondaxe/La Voz de Galicia | 13–17 Nov 2026 | 300 | ? | 40.0; 4 | 26.0; 2 | | 15.7; 1 | 7.2; 0 | ? 0 | 14.0 |
| Sondaxe/La Voz de Galicia | 12–16 Nov 2026 | 300 | ? | 39.5; 4 | 28.5; 2 | | 13.7; 1 | 7.8; 0 | ? 0 | 11.0 |
| Sondaxe/La Voz de Galicia | 11–15 Nov 2026 | 300 | ? | 39.0; 3 | 30.8; 3 | | 13.0; 1 | 8.0; 0 | 4.8; 0 | 8.2 |
| Sondaxe/La Voz de Galicia | 10–14 Nov 2026 | 300 | ? | 38.4; 3 | 32.5; 3 | | 11.7; 1 | 9.6; 0 | ? 0 | 4.9 |
| Sondaxe/La Voz de Galicia | 9–13 Nov 2026 | 300 | ? | 38.7; 3 | 32.9; 3 | | 12.7; 1 | 10.0; 0 | ? 0 | 5.8 |
| Sondaxe/La Voz de Galicia | 17–25 Sep 2025 | 1,223 | ? | 37.0; 4 | 26.5; 2 | ? 0 | 15.8; 1 | – | – | 10.5 |
| Sondaxe/La Voz de Galicia | 5–13 Feb 2025 | ? | ? | 38.7; 4 | 28.7; 2 | 6.4; 0 | 15.3; 1 | – | – | 10.0 |
| Sondaxe/La Voz de Galicia | 24 Sep–2 Oct 2024 | ? | ? | 40.8; 3 | 28.6; 2 | 10.7; 1 | 12.0; 1 | – | – | 12.2 |
| 2024 EP election | 9 Jun 2024 | —N/a | 43.6 | 39.5 (4) | 28.9 (2) | 2.6 (0) | 17.4 (1) | 4.2 (0) | – | 10.6 |
| 2024 regional election | 18 Feb 2024 | —N/a | 56.9 | 44.0 (3) | 14.8 (1) | 2.5 (0) | 34.4 (3) | 2.3 (0) | – | 9.6 |
| Sondaxe/La Voz de Galicia | 29 Dec–4 Jan 2024 | ? | ? | ? 3 | ? 2 | ? 1 | ? 1 | – | – | ? |
| Sondaxe/La Voz de Galicia | 18–26 Oct 2023 | ? | ? | 40.5; 3 | 27.5; 2 | 11.6; 1 | 12.1; 1 | – | – | 13.0 |
| 2023 general election | 23 Jul 2023 | —N/a | 63.7 | 39.7; 3 | 31.4; 3 | 13.2; 1 | 9.4; 0 | 4.8; 0 | – | 8.3 |

=== Santa Cruz de Tenerife ===
| Polling firm/Commissioner | Fieldwork date | Sample size | Turnout | PP | PSOE | CCa | Sumar | NCa | Podemos | Vox | SALF | UPC | Lead |
|---|---|---|---|---|---|---|---|---|---|---|---|---|---|
| GCEMOP/Atlántico Hoy | 28 Oct–11 Nov 2026 | ? | ? | 24.0– 25.0; 2 | 26.0– 27.0; 2/3 | 16.0– 17.0; 1 | | | | 17.0– 18.0; 1/2 | – | 9.0– 10.0; 0/1 | 2.0 |
| 2024 EP election | 9 Jun 2024 | —N/a | 36.7 | 28.4 (2) | 29.3 (3) | 14.2 (1) | 3.4 (0) | | 3.5 (0) | 11.0 (1) | 5.9 (0) | – | 0.9 |
| 2023 general election | 23 Jul 2023 | —N/a | 56.8 | 35.4; 3 | 33.5; 3 | 16.7; 1 | 10.8; 0 | 0.6; 0 | | – | – | – | 1.9 |

=== Valencia ===
| Polling firm/Commissioner | Fieldwork date | Sample size | Turnout | PP | PSOE | Sumem per Guanyar | Vox | Podemos | Compromís | SALF | FV | Lead |
|---|---|---|---|---|---|---|---|---|---|---|---|---|
| SyM Consulting/EPDA | 6–16 Oct 2026 | ? | ? | 33.5; 5/6 | 31.4; 5/6 | | 18.4; 3 | | | – | 14.5; 2 | 2.1 |
| 2024 EP election | 9 Jun 2024 | —N/a | 54.4 | 34.4 (6) | 31.5 (6) | 11.3 (2) | 8.9 (1) | 3.4 (0) | | 5.8 (1) | – | 2.9 |
| 2023 general election | 23 Jul 2023 | —N/a | 72.6 | 33.6; 6 | 32.1; 5 | 16.9; 3 | 15.2; 2 | | | – | – | 1.5 |
