= Next Aragonese regional election =

Election in the Spanish region of Aragon

- No later than 10 March 2030

All 67 seats in the Cortes of Aragon 34 seats needed for a majority
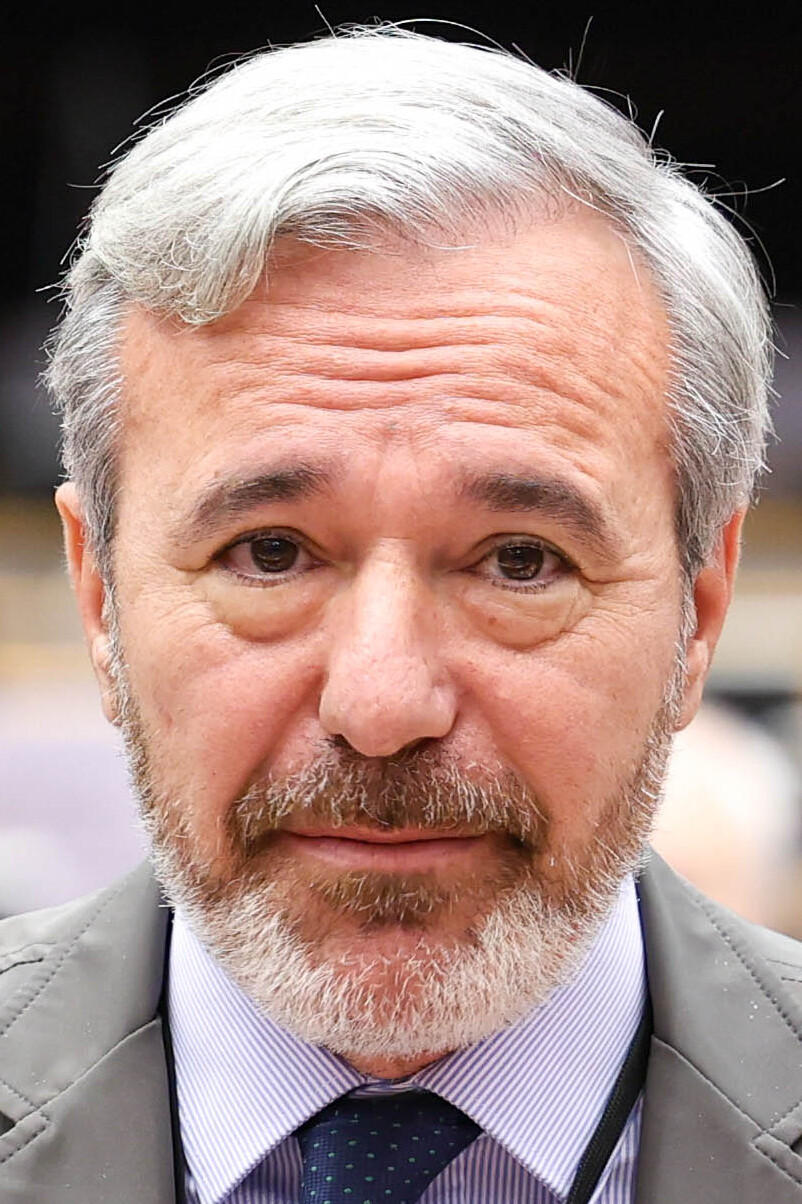

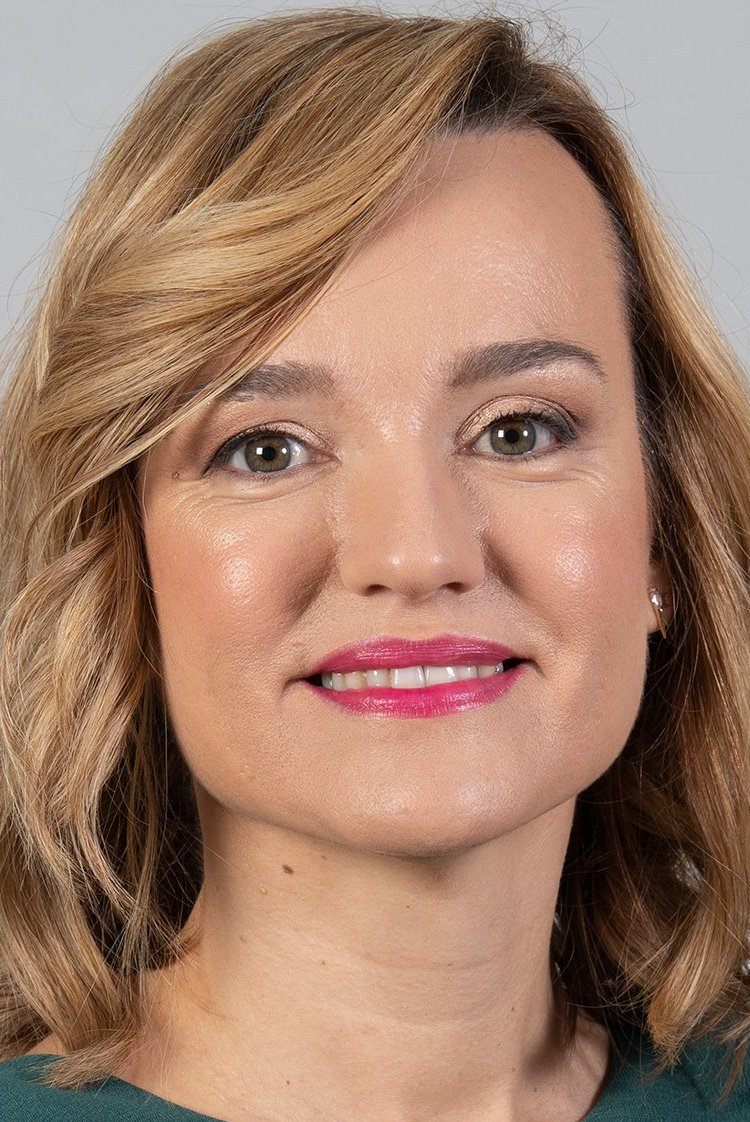

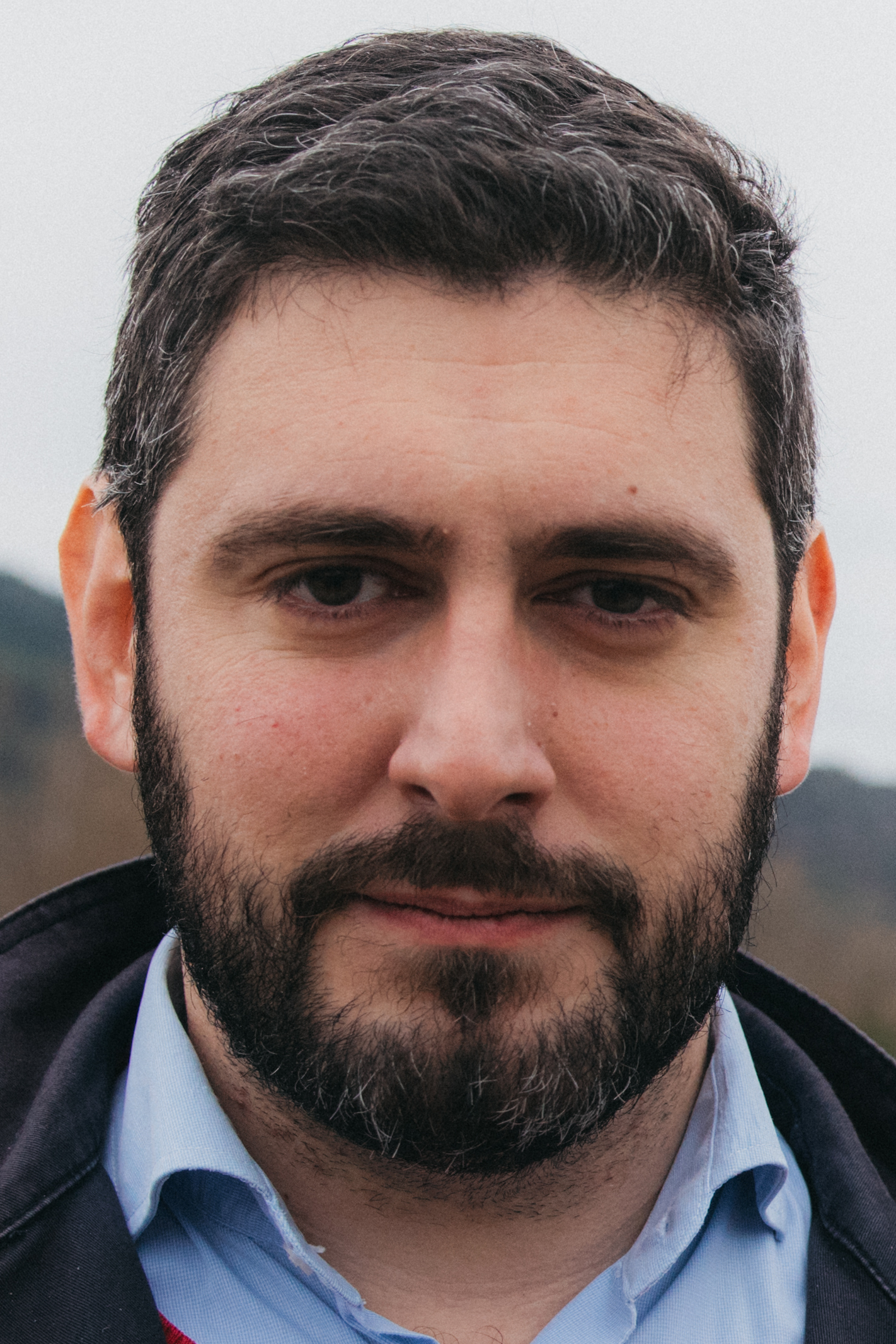

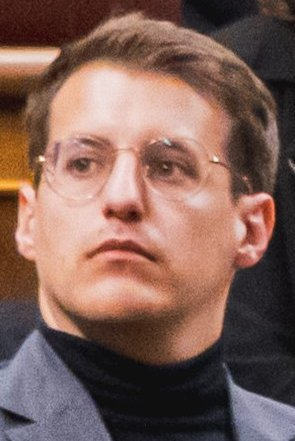

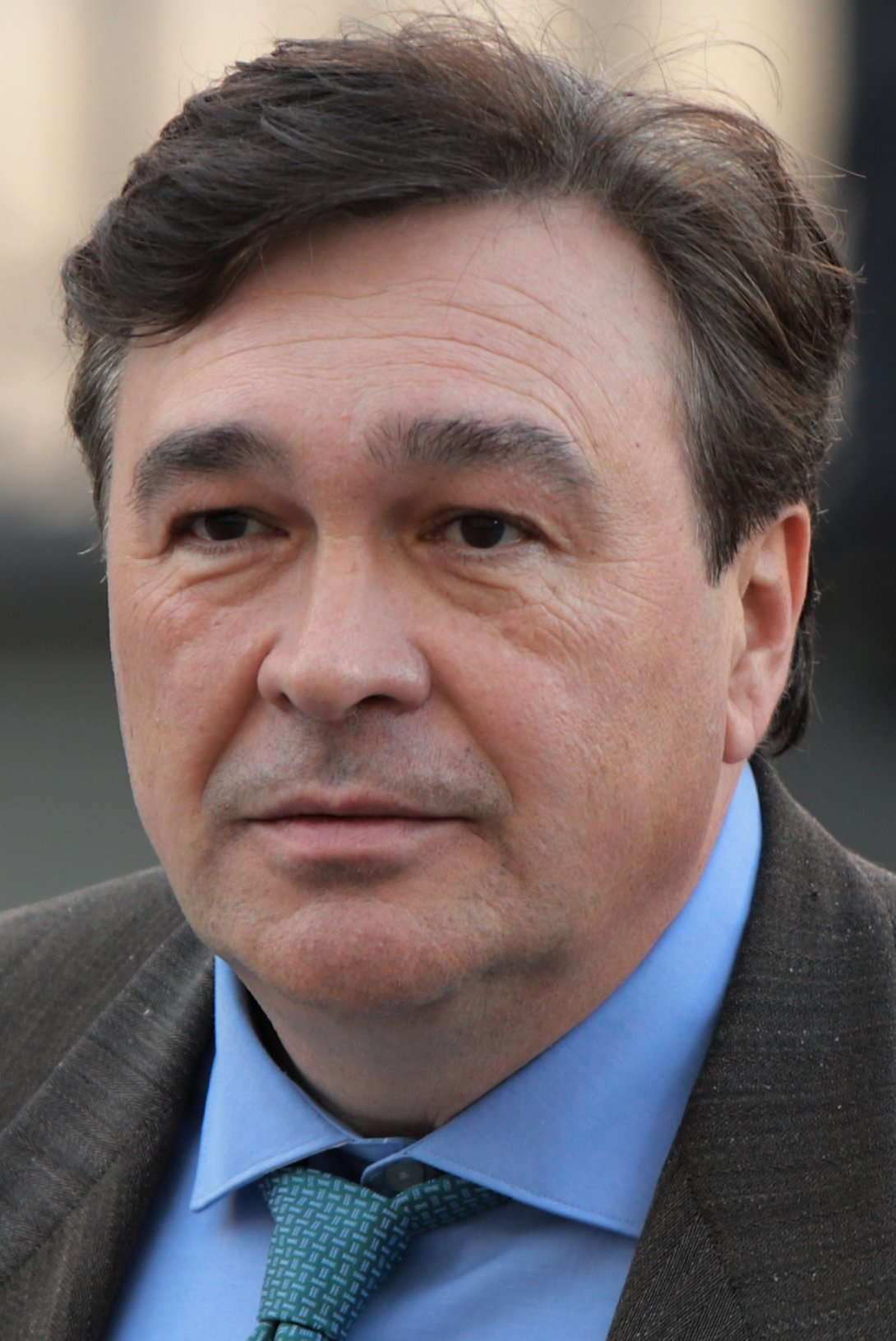

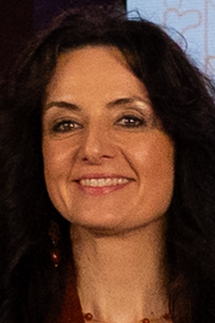
Leader	Jorge Azcón	Pilar Alegría	Alejandro Nolasco
Party	PP	PSOE	Vox
Leader since	19 December 2021	27 January 2025	23 December 2022
Leader's seat	Zaragoza	Zaragoza	Teruel
Last election	26 seats, 34.2%	18 seats, 24.4%	14 seats, 17.8%
Current seats	26	18	14
Seats needed	▲8	▲16	▲20
Leader	Jorge Pueyo	Tomás Guitarte	Marta Abengochea
Party	CHA	Existe	IU–MS
Leader since	3 January 2026	28 January 2023	29 November 2025
Leader's seat	Zaragoza	Teruel	Zaragoza
Last election	6 seats, 9.7%	2 seats, 3.5%	1 seat, 3.0%
Current seats	6	2	1
Seats needed	▲28	▲32	▲33
Incumbent President
Jorge Azcón
PP

A regional election will be held in Aragon no later than 10 March 2030 to elect the 13th Cortes of the autonomous community. All 67 seats in the Cortes will be up for election. The parliament elected in February 2026 (slightly over one year before scheduled) is allowed to serve for a full four-year term under the 2007 statutory reform, meaning this election is not required to be held concurrently with other regional elections in May 2027.

== Overview ==
Under the 2007 Statute of Autonomy, the Cortes of Aragon is the unicameral legislature of the homonymous autonomous community, having legislative power in devolved matters, as well as the ability to grant or withdraw confidence from a regional president. The electoral and procedural rules are supplemented by national law provisions.

=== Date ===
The term of the Cortes of Aragon expires four years after the date of its previous election, unless it is dissolved earlier. The election decree shall be issued no later than 25 days before the scheduled expiration date of parliament and published on the following day in the Official Gazette of Aragon (BOA), with election day taking place 54 days after the decree's publication. The previous election was held on 8 February 2026, which means that the chamber's term will expire on 8 February 2030. The election decree shall be published in the BOA no later than 15 January 2030, setting the latest possible date for election day on 10 March 2030.

The regional president has the prerogative to dissolve the Cortes of Aragon at any given time and call a snap election, provided that no motion of no confidence is in process and that dissolution does not occur before one year after a previous one. In the event of an investiture process failing to elect a regional president within a two-month period from the Cortes's reconvening, the chamber is to be automatically dissolved and a fresh election called.

The 2026 snap election saw the People's Party (PP) of incumbent president Jorge Azcón falling well short of an overall majority in parliament, requiring the support of the far-right Vox party to retain power. As a result, Spanish media commented on the possibility of a repeat election in the event of a failure in the government formation process. The likelihood for a repeat election to take place on 28 June 2026 rose for a few weeks before a deal was finally reached that allowed Azcón to be re-elected as regional president on 29 April.

=== Electoral system ===
Voting for the Cortes is based on universal suffrage, comprising all Spanish nationals over 18 years of age, registered in Aragon and with full political rights, provided that they have not been deprived of the right to vote by a final sentence.

The Cortes of Aragon has a minimum of 65 and a maximum of 80 seats, with electoral provisions fixing its size at 67. All are elected in three multi-member constituencies—corresponding to the provinces of Huesca, Teruel and Zaragoza, each of which is assigned an initial minimum of 14 seats and the remaining 25 distributed in proportion to population (with the seat-to-population ratio in the most populated province not exceeding three times that of the least populated one)—using the D'Hondt method and closed-list proportional voting, with a three percent-threshold of valid votes (including blank ballots) in each constituency. The use of this electoral method may result in a higher effective threshold depending on district magnitude and vote distribution.

As a result of the aforementioned allocation, each Cortes constituency would be entitled the following seats (as of 11 December 2025): (Note: This seat allocation has been manually calculated by applying the electoral rules set out in the law, on the basis of the latest official population figures provided by the Spanish government as of 2026. As such, it should be deemed as a provisional, non-binding estimation. The definitive allocation will be determined by the election decree at the time of the parliament's dissolution.)

Seats	Constituencies
35	Zaragoza
18	Huesca
14	Teruel

The law does not provide for by-elections to fill vacant seats; instead, any vacancies arising after the proclamation of candidates and during the legislative term will be filled by the next candidates on the party lists or, when required, by designated substitutes.

=== Current parliament ===
The table below shows the composition of the parliamentary groups in the chamber at the present time.

Current parliamentary composition
Groups	Parties	Legislators	
Groups	Parties	Seats	Total
People's Parliamentary Group in the Cortes of Aragon	PP	26	26
Socialist Parliamentary Group	PSOE	18	18
Vox Parliamentary Group	Vox	14	14
Aragonese Union Parliamentary Group	CHA	6	6
Mixed Parliamentary Group	TE	2	3
Mixed Parliamentary Group	IU	1	3

== Parties and candidates ==
The electoral law allows for parties and federations registered in the interior ministry, alliances and groupings of electors to present lists of candidates. Parties and federations intending to form an alliance are required to inform the relevant electoral commission within 10 days of the election call, whereas groupings of electors need to secure the signature of at least one percent of the electorate in the constituencies for which they seek election, disallowing electors from signing for more than one list. Additionally, a balanced composition of men and women was required in the electoral lists through the use of a zipper system.

Below is a list of the main parties and alliances which will likely contest the election:

Candidacy	Parties and alliances	Leading candidate	Ideology	Previous result		Gov.	Ref.
Candidacy	Parties and alliances	Leading candidate	Ideology	Vote %	Seats	Gov.	Ref.
PP	List: People's Party (PP)	Jorge Azcón	Conservatism; Christian democracy	34.2%	26	Yes	
PSOE	List: Spanish Socialist Workers' Party (PSOE)	Pilar Alegría	Social democracy	24.4%	18	No	
Vox	List: Vox (Vox)	Alejandro Nolasco	Right-wing populism Ultranationalism; National conservatism	17.8%	14	No	
CHA	List: Aragonese Union (CHA)	Jorge Pueyo	Aragonese nationalism Eco-socialism	9.7%	6	No	
Existe	List: Teruel Exists (TE); Aragon Exists (AE)	Tomás Guitarte	Localism; Ruralism	3.5%	2	No	
IU–MS	List: United Left of Aragon (IU) – Communist Party of Aragon (PCE–A) – The Dawn Marxist Organization (La Aurora (OM)) – Republican Left (IR); Unite Movement (SMR)	Marta Abengochea	Socialism; Communism; Progressivism	3.0%	1	No	

== Opinion polls ==
The table below lists opinion polling results in reverse chronological order, showing the most recent first and using the dates when the survey fieldwork was done, as opposed to the date of publication. Where the fieldwork dates are unknown, the date of publication is given instead. The highest percentage figure in each polling survey is displayed with its background shaded in the leading party's colour. If a tie ensues, this is applied to the figures with the highest percentages. The "Lead" column on the right shows the percentage-point difference between the parties with the highest percentages in a poll.

=== Voting intention estimates ===
The table below lists weighted voting intention estimates. Refusals are generally excluded from the party vote percentages, while question wording and the treatment of "don't know" responses and those not intending to vote may vary between polling organisations. When available, seat projections determined by the polling organisations are displayed below (or in place of) the percentages in a smaller font; 34 seats are required for an absolute majority in the Cortes of Aragon.

Polling firm/Commissioner	Fieldwork date	Sample size	Turnout	PP	PSOE	Vox	CHA	Existe	IU	SALF	PAR	Podemos	Lead
A+M/Heraldo de Aragón	1–6 Oct 2026	2,200	69.2	32.1; 23	24.3; 19	20.8; 15	10.9; 8	2.8; 1	3.6; 1	–	–	–	7.8
2026 regional election	8 Feb 2026	—N/a	65.1	34.2; 26	24.4; 18	17.8; 14	9.7; 6	3.5; 2	3.0; 1	2.7; 0	1.2; 0	1.0; 0	9.8

== Bibliography ==
- Ley Orgánica 5/1985, de 19 de junio, del Régimen Electoral General (Organic Law 5/1985). Official State Gazette (in Spanish). 19 June 1985 [version as of 2 July 2026]. BOE-A-1985-11672.
- Ley 2/1987, de 16 de febrero, Electoral de la Comunidad Autónoma de Aragón (Law 2/1987). Official State Gazette (in Spanish). 16 February 1987 [version as of 28 February 2023]. BOE-A-1987-5339.
- Ley Orgánica 5/2007, de 20 de abril, de reforma del Estatuto de Autonomía de Aragón (Organic Law 5/2007). Official State Gazette (in Spanish). 20 April 2007 [version as of 28 December 2022]. BOE-A-2007-8444.
- Decreto Legislativo 1/2022, de 6 de abril, del Gobierno de Aragón, por el que se aprueba el texto refundido de la Ley del Presidente o Presidenta y del Gobierno de Aragón (Legislative Decree 1/2022). Official State Gazette (in Spanish). 6 April 2022 [version as of 20 April 2022]. BOE-A-2022-7004.
