= Teruel (Senate constituency) =

Senate constituency in Spain

Coordinates: 40°40′N 0°40′W

- Senate of Spain; Electoral constituency
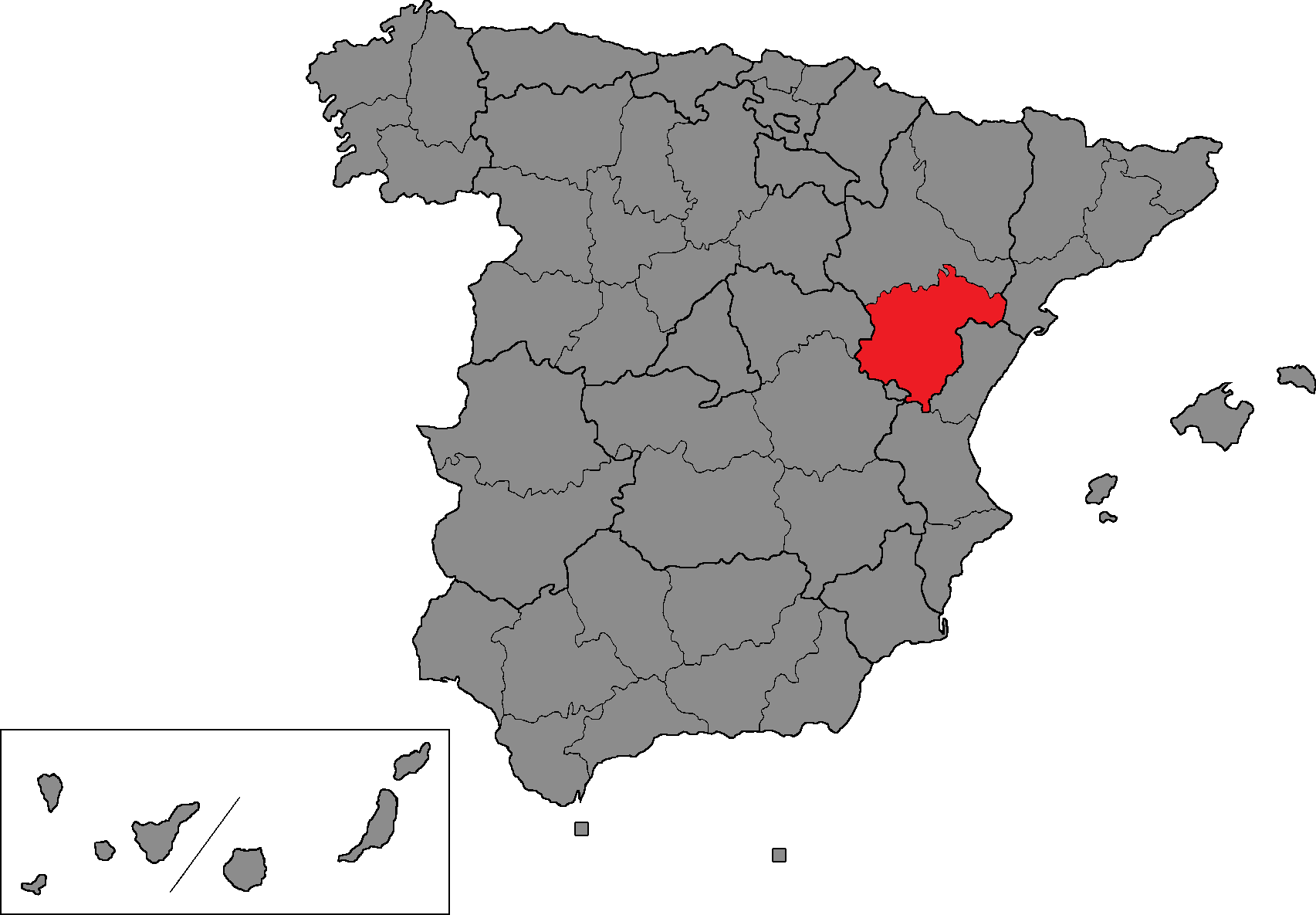
- Location of Teruel within Spain
- Province: Teruel
- Autonomous community: Aragon
- Population: ▲135,661 (2024)
- Electorate: ▼106,352 (2023)
- Major settlements: Teruel

Current constituency
- Created: 1977
- Seats: 4
- Members: PP (3); PSOE (1)

Teruel is one of the 60 constituencies represented in the Senate of Spain, the upper chamber of the Spanish parliament, the Cortes Generales. The constituency (whose boundaries correspond to those of the homonymous province) elects four senators. The electoral system uses open-list (Note: Parties can group candidates into lists, although each candidate is treated separately for the purpose of the voting procedure.) partial block voting, with electors voting for individual candidates instead of parties. Electors can vote for up to three candidates.

== Electoral system ==
The constituency was created as per the Political Reform Law and was first contested in the 1977 general election. The Law provided for the provinces of Spain to be established as multi-member districts in the Senate, with this regulation being maintained under the Spanish Constitution of 1978. Additionally, the Constitution requires for any modification of the provincial limits to be approved under an organic law, needing an absolute majority in the Cortes Generales.

Voting is based on universal suffrage, comprising all Spanish nationals over 18 years of age with full political rights, provided that they have not been deprived of the right to vote by a final sentence. The only exception was in 1977, when this was limited to nationals over 21 years of age and in full enjoyment of their political and civil rights. Amendments in 2011 required non-resident citizens to apply for voting, a system known as "begged" voting (Spanish: Voto rogado). which was abolished in 2022. Further, amendments in 2018 granted the right to vote to those legally incapacitated. 209 Senate seats (207 in 1977, 208 from 1978 to 2026) are elected using open-list partial block voting: voters in constituencies electing four seats can choose up to three candidates; in those with two or three seats, up to two; and in single-member districts, one. Each of the 47 peninsular provinces is allocated four seats, while in insular provinces—such as the Balearic and Canary Islands—the districts are the islands themselves, with the larger ones (Mallorca, Gran Canaria and Tenerife) being allocated three seats each, and the smaller ones (Menorca, Ibiza, Formentera, Fuerteventura, La Gomera, El Hierro, Lanzarote and La Palma) one each. (Note: La Gomera and El Hierro comprised a single constituency for the 1977 election. A constitutional reform in 2026 awarded Formentera an independent senator separate from Ibiza.) Ceuta and Melilla elect two seats each. Until 1985, the law also provided for by-elections to fill Senate seats vacated up to two years into the legislature; subsequently, any vacancies arising after the proclamation of candidates and during the legislative term are filled by the next candidates on the party lists or, when required, by designated substitutes.

The electoral law allows for parties and federations registered in the interior ministry, alliances and groupings of electors to present lists of candidates. Parties and federations intending to form an alliance are required to inform the relevant electoral commission within 10 days of the election call—15 before 1985—whereas groupings of electors need to secure the signature of at least one percent of the electorate in the constituencies for which they seek election—one permille of the electorate, with a compulsory minimum of 500 signatures, until 1985—disallowing electors from signing for more than one list. Also since 2011, parties, federations or alliances that have not obtained a mandate in either chamber of the Cortes at the preceding election are required to secure the signature of at least 0.1 percent of electors in the aforementioned constituencies. Amendments in 2007 required a balanced composition of men and women in the electoral lists, so that candidates of either sex made up at least 40 percent of the total composition; further amendments in 2024 required the use of a zipper system.

== Senators ==
Senators for Teruel 1977–
Key to parties PSOE TE UCD PP CP AP
Legislature	Election	Distribution
Constituent	1977	1 / 3
1st	1979	1 / 3
2nd	1982	3 / 1
3rd	1986	3 / 1
4th	1989	3 / 1
5th	1993	3 / 1
6th	1996	1 / 3
7th	2000	1 / 3
8th	2004	2 / 2
9th	2008	3 / 1
10th	2011	1 / 3
11th	2015	1 / 3
12th	2016	1 / 3
13th	2019 (Apr)	3 / 1
14th	2019 (Nov)	2 / 2
15th	2023	1 / 3

== General elections ==
=== 2023 ===
Summary of the 23 July 2023 Senate of Spain election results
Candidates	Parties and coalitions	Popular vote	
Candidates	Parties and coalitions	Votes	%
Emma Buj Sánchez	PP	27,021	36.35
Carmen Pobo Sánchez	PP	25,687	34.55
Manuel Blasco Marqués	PP	25,306	34.04
María José Villalba Chavarría	PSOE	21,450	28.85
• Antonio Tomás Vivas	PSOE	20,210	27.18
• Vanesa Pellicena Pellicena	PSOE	19,519	26.25
• Beatriz Martín Larred	Existe	13,904	18.70
• Joaquín Egea Serrano	Existe	12,249	16.47
• Raúl Blasco Aznar	Existe	11,355	15.27
• Juan Vicente Férriz Hernández	Vox	8,339	11.21
• Manuel Lozano Polo	Vox	7,447	10.01
• Bárbara Alastuey Rivas	Vox	7,045	9.47
• Sandra González Albalad	Sumar	4,720	6.34
• Juan Carlos Blasco Nuño	Sumar	3,458	4.65
• Sheyla Luna Marín	Sumar	3,196	4.29
• Ramón José Fuertes Ortiz	PAR	1,014	1.36
• Pilar Romero Villalba	PAR	784	1.05
• Alfonso Palmero Quintanilla	PAR	631	0.84
• Tasio Peña Jiménez	PACMA	406	0.54
• Guillermo Castellá Aguilar	PCTE	193	0.25
• María del Mar Pérez Torralva	PUM+J	106	0.14
• Enrique Altemir Guijarro	Recortes Cero	88	0.11
Blank ballots		1,033	1.38
Total		216,138	
Valid votes		74,332	98.04
Invalid votes		1,485	1.95
Votes cast / turnout		75,817	74.87
Abstentions		25,438	25.12
Registered voters		101,255	

=== November 2019 ===
Summary of the 10 November 2019 Senate of Spain election results in Teruel
Candidates	Parties and coalitions	Popular vote	
Candidates	Parties and coalitions	Votes	%
Manuel Blasco Marqués	PP	20,925	28.69
Joaquín Egea Serrano	¡TE!	20,686	28.37
María Carmen Pobo Sánchez	PP	19,820	27.18
Beatriz Martín Larred	¡TE!	19,060	26.14
• María José Villalba Chavarría	PSOE	18,950	25.99
• Joaquín Noe Serrano	PSOE	18,382	25.21
• Miguel Ángel Estevan Serrano	PP	17,969	24.64
• María Perla Borao Aguirre	PSOE	17,788	24.39
• Alba Polo Artal	¡TE!	17,594	24.13
• Juan Manuel Hernández Simón	Vox	8,357	11.46
• Ana Isabel Gimeno Pérez	Podemos–IU	4,389	6.02
• Alfonso Palmero Quintanilla	Cs	4,227	5.80
• Rafael Vivas Paniagua	Podemos–IU	3,538	4.85
• María José Alonso Pérez	Cs	3,501	4.80
• Félix Rubio Ferrer	Podemos–IU	3,239	4.44
• Luis Octavio Esteban Guijarro	Cs	3,069	4.21
• Lourdes Mariñoso Aguarón	PACMA	713	0.98
• Desamparados Herrera Rubio	PCPE	162	0.22
• Chemari García Rodríguez	PYLN	110	0.15
• Ana Burriel Navarro	Recortes Cero–GV	106	0.15
• Andrés Serrano Paradinas	PUM+J	103	0.14
• María Dolores Ivars Samper	UdT	36	0.05
• José Luis Mallén Herrero	aUna CV	30	0.04
• Kleber Ramiro Esquivel Moscoso	UdT	22	0.03
• Jesús Miguel Ortiz Sánchez	UdT	21	0.03
Blank ballots		1,088	1.49
Total		72,926	
Valid votes		72,926	98.05
Invalid votes		1,452	1.95
Votes cast / turnout		74,378	69.21
Abstentions		33,089	30.79
Registered voters		107,467	

== Bibliography ==
- Ley 1/1977, de 4 de enero, para la Reforma Política (Fundamental Law 1/1977). Official State Gazette (in Spanish). 4 January 1977. BOE-A-1977-165.
- Real Decreto-ley 20/1977, de 18 de marzo, sobre Normas Electorales (Royal Decree-Law 20/1977). Official State Gazette (in Spanish). 18 March 1977. BOE-A-1977-7445.
- Constitución Española (Constitution). Official State Gazette (in Spanish). 27 December 1978. BOE-A-1978-31229.
- Ley Orgánica 5/1985, de 19 de junio, del Régimen Electoral General (Organic Law 5/1985). Official State Gazette (in Spanish). 19 June 1985. BOE-A-1985-11672.
- Carreras de Odriozola, Albert; Tafunell Sambola, Xavier (2005) [1989]. Estadísticas históricas de España, siglos XIX-XX (PDF) (in Spanish). Vol. 1 (II ed.). Bilbao: Fundación BBVA. pp. 1072–1097. ISBN 84-96515-00-1. Archived from the original (PDF) on 24 September 2015.
