= 2026 Aragonese regional election =

Election in the Spanish region of Aragon

- 8 February 2026

All 67 seats in the Cortes of Aragon 34 seats needed for a majority
- Opinion polls
- Registered: 1,036,331 ▲1.7%
- Turnout: 674,570 (65.1%) ▼1.4 pp
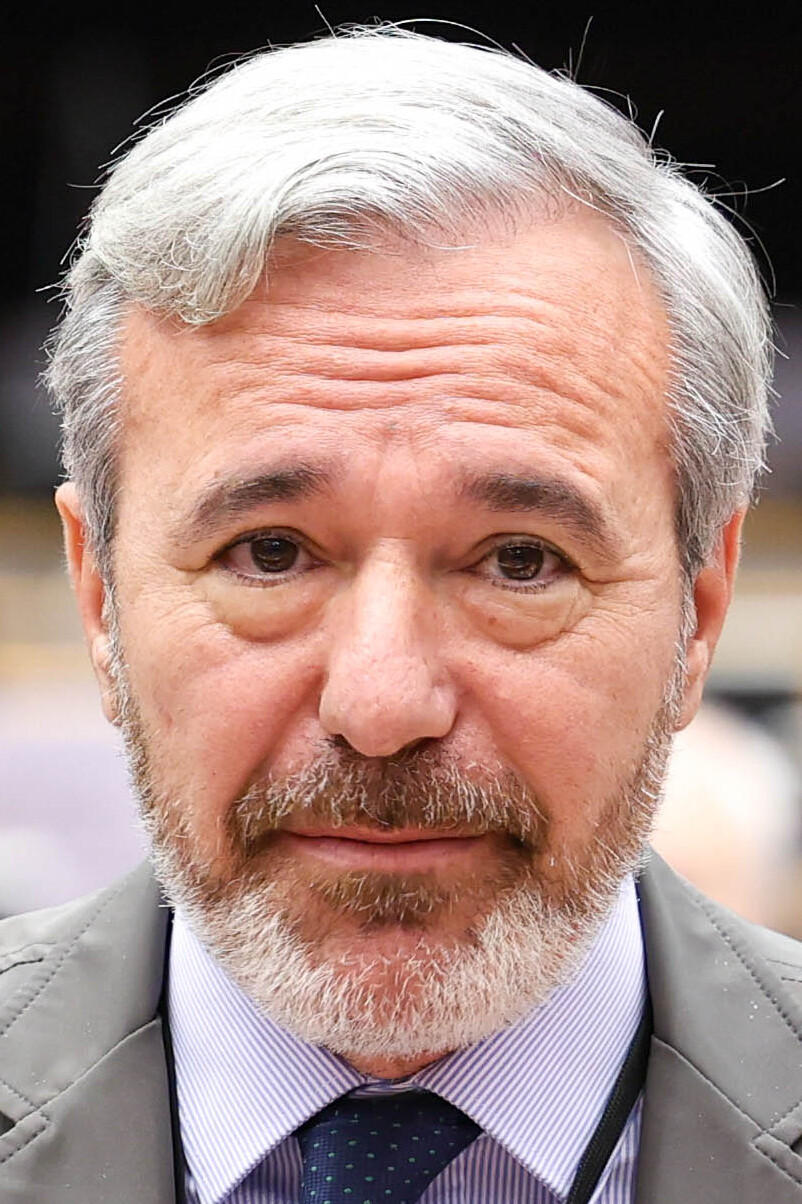

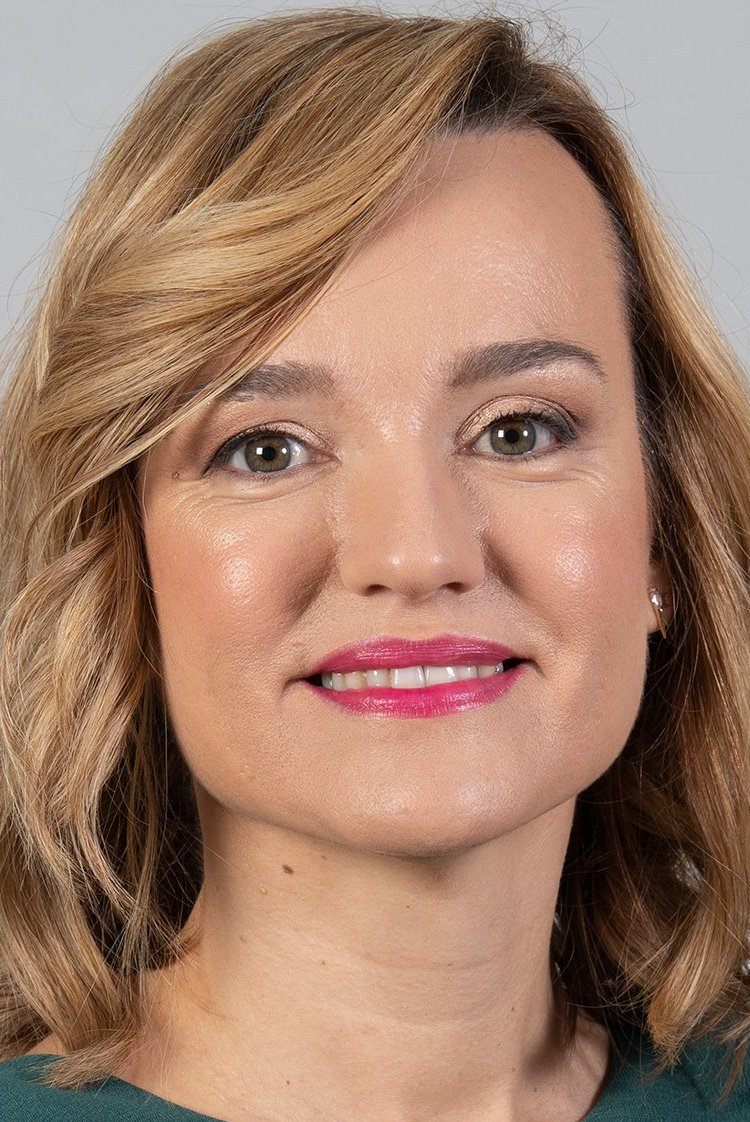

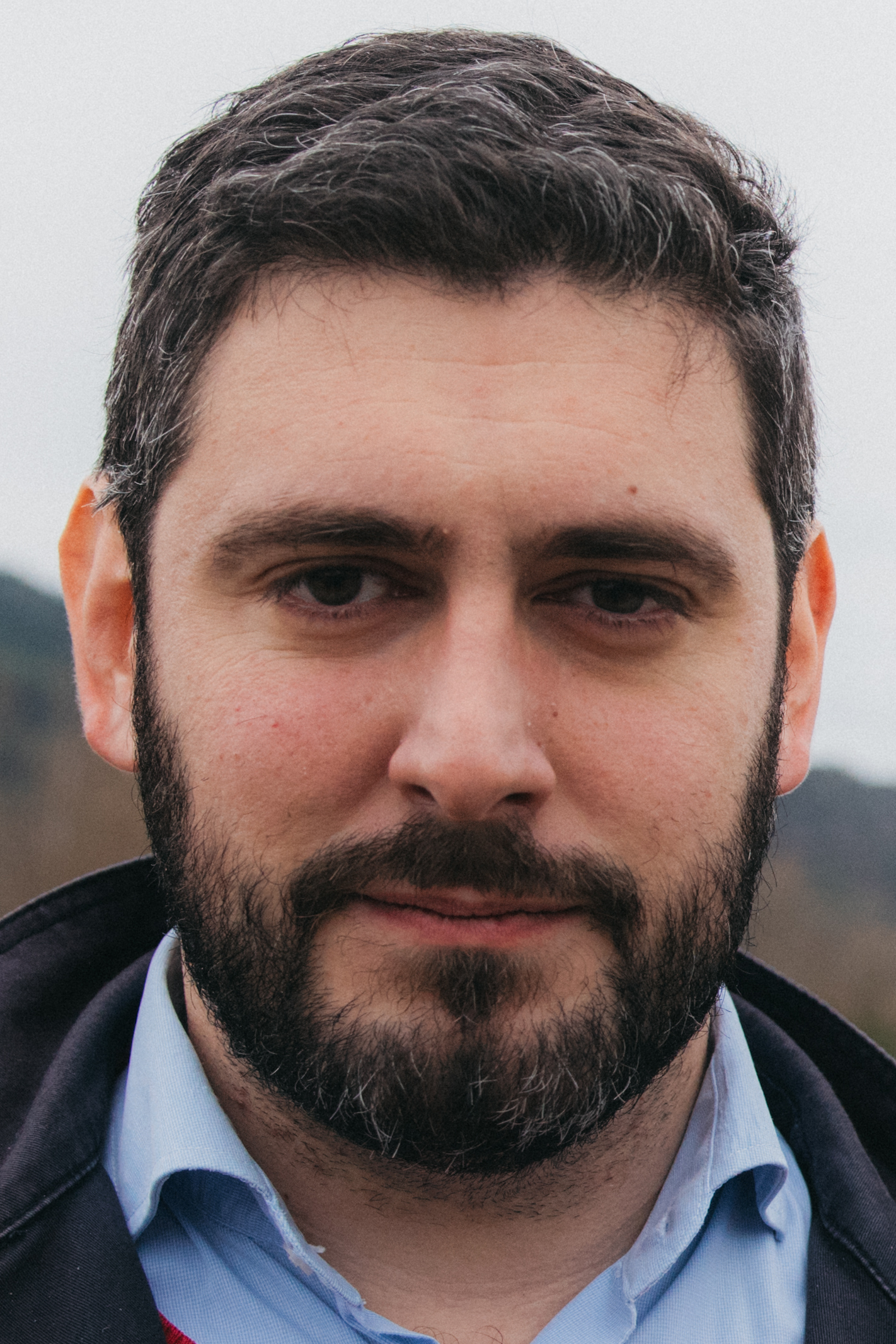

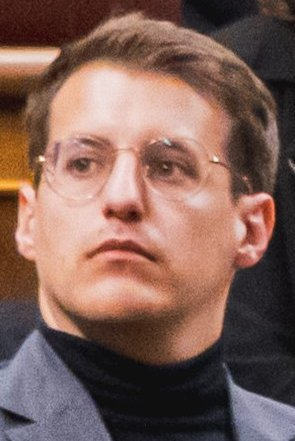

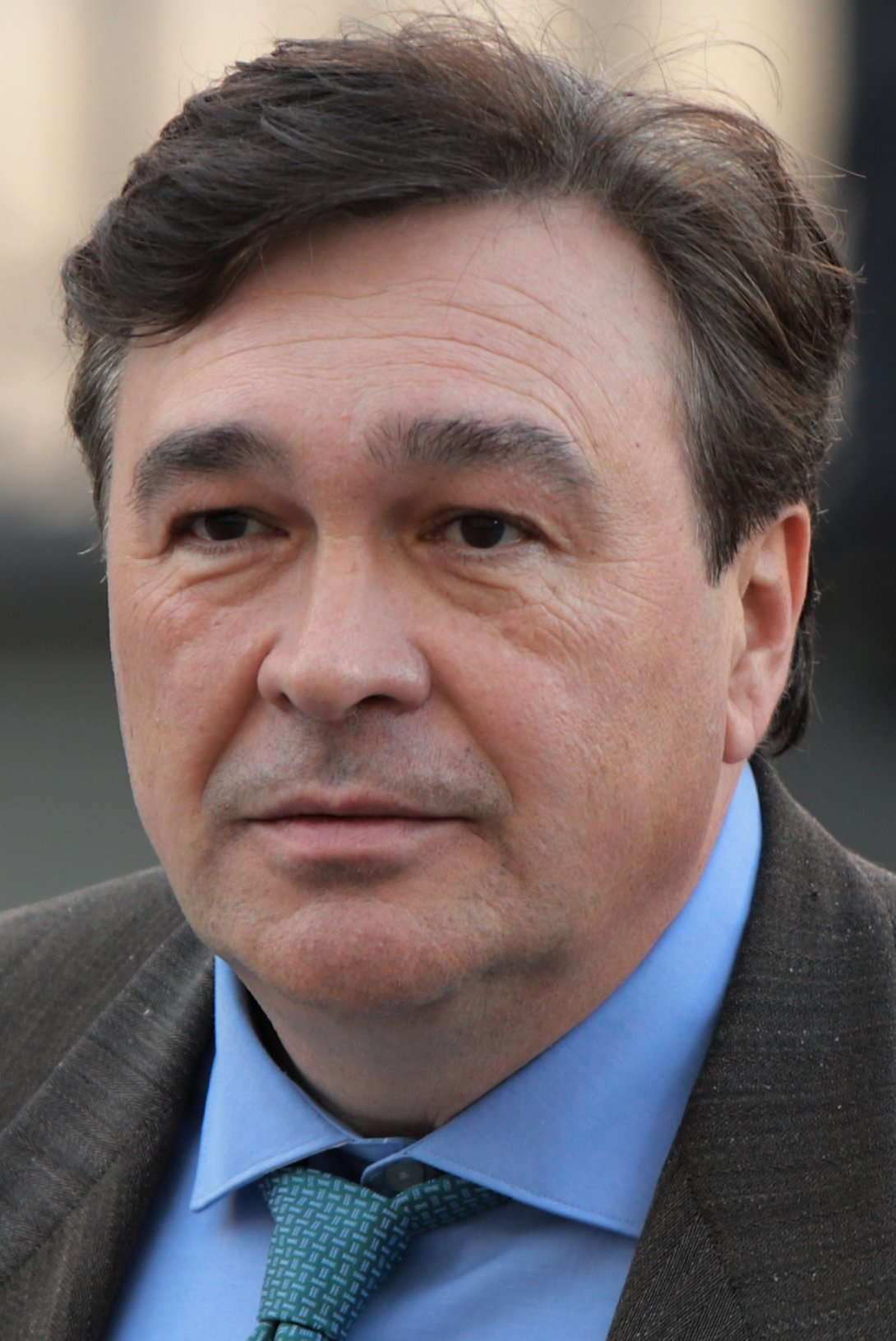

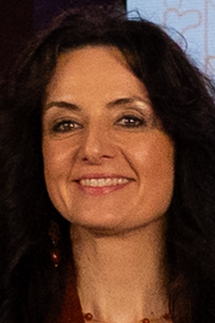
	First party	Second party	Third party
Leader	Jorge Azcón	Pilar Alegría	Alejandro Nolasco
Party	PP	PSOE	Vox
Leader since	19 December 2021	27 January 2025	23 December 2022
Leader's seat	Zaragoza	Zaragoza	Teruel
Last election	28 seats, 35.5%	23 seats, 29.6%	7 seats, 11.2%
Seats won	26	18	14
Seat change	▼2	▼5	▲7
Popular vote	228,388	162,925	119,281
Percentage	34.2%	24.4%	17.8%
Swing	▼1.3 pp	▼5.2 pp	▲6.6 pp
	Fourth party	Fifth party	Sixth party
Leader	Jorge Pueyo	Tomás Guitarte	Marta Abengochea
Party	CHA	Existe	IU–MS
Leader since	3 January 2026	28 January 2023	29 November 2025
Leader's seat	Zaragoza	Teruel	Zaragoza
Last election	3 seats, 5.3% (Note: Results for CHA (5.1%, 3 seats) and Equo (0.2%, 0 seats) in the 2023 election.)	3 seats, 5.0%	1 seat, 3.1%
Seats won	6	2	1
Seat change	▲3	▼1	0
Popular vote	65,118	23,616	19,832
Percentage	9.7%	3.5%	3.0%
Swing	▲4.4 pp	▼1.5 pp	▼0.1 pp
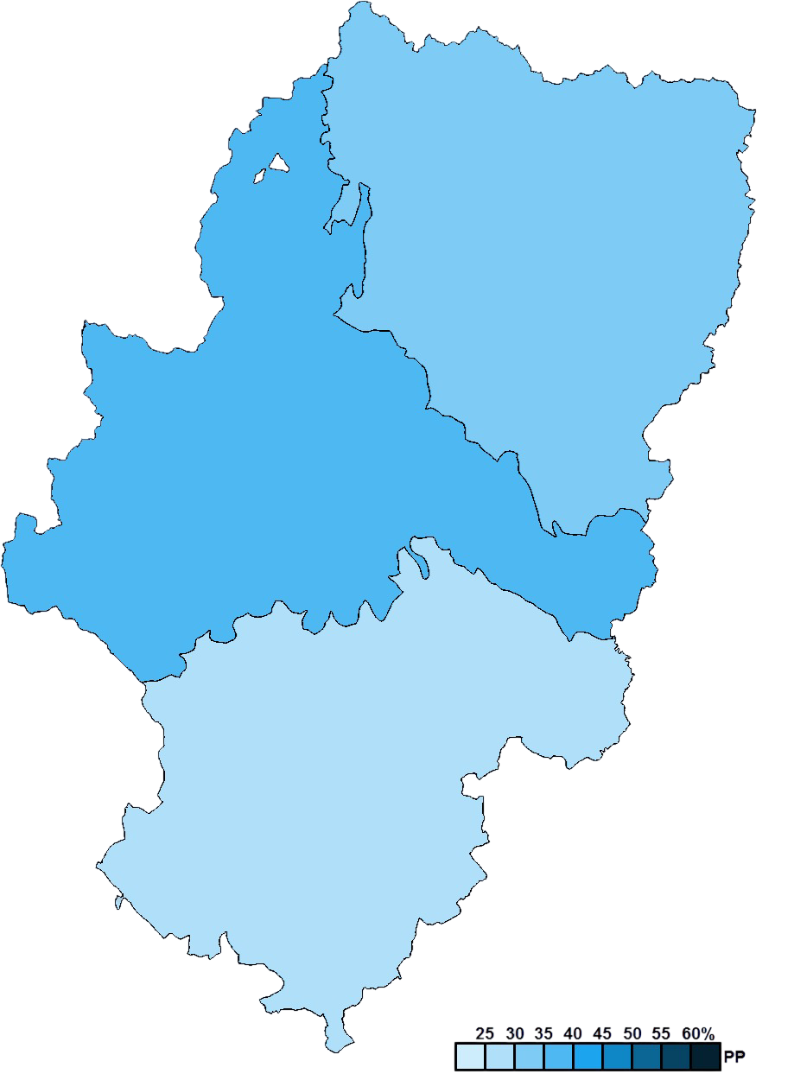
- Constituency results map for the Cortes of Aragon
President before election
Jorge Azcón
PP
President after election
Jorge Azcón
PP

A regional election was held in Aragon on 8 February 2026 to elect the 12th Cortes of the autonomous community. All 67 seats in the Cortes were up for election. This marked the first time that an Aragonese president exercised the legal prerogative to call a snap election.

The 2023 election had seen a coalition between the People's Party (PP) and the far-right Vox party being formed under the presidency of Jorge Azcón. This cabinet lasted until July 2024, when a strategic movement from Vox's national leadership saw the party exiting the government and leaving Azcón in a minority. Discrepancies between PP and Vox during the negotiations of the 2026 budget and Azcón's aim to capitalize on the perceived weakness of the Spanish Socialist Workers' Party (PSOE)—with the farewell and later death of former president Javier Lambán and his succession by Spanish government spokesperson and education minister, Pilar Alegría—resulted in a snap election being called for February 2026, in a similar move to regional colleague María Guardiola in Extremadura, and one month in advance of a scheduled regional election in Castile and León.

In an attempt to expand its parliamentary majority, the PP attempted to turn the election into a referendum on the tenure of the prime minister of Spain, Pedro Sánchez, in a region which was traditionally seen as "Spain's Ohio" for its role as a bellwether. The campaign's start was shaken by the Adamuz train derailments, which prompted all political parties but Vox to postpone their election events as a gesture of mourning. While the PP emerged as the largest political party, its result—underperforming expectations by actually losing support compared to 2023—placed it in a more dependant position to Vox (which doubled its parliamentary representation) than it was before the election, in what was widely seen as a failure in Azcón's early election gamble. The PSOE's decline predicted by opinion polls was confirmed, albeit short of falling below its worst historical result of 2015, whereas the left-wing Chunta Aragonesista capitalized on the losses of United Left and especially Podemos, the latter of which was shut out of parliament. The regionalist Aragonese Party was left without representation for the first time since the first democratic election in the region in 1983.

== Overview ==
Under the 2007 Statute of Autonomy, the Cortes of Aragon was the unicameral legislature of the homonymous autonomous community, having legislative power in devolved matters, as well as the ability to grant or withdraw confidence from a regional president. The electoral and procedural rules were supplemented by national law provisions.

=== Date ===
The term of the Cortes of Aragon expired four years after the date of its previous election, unless it was dissolved earlier. The election decree was required to be issued no later than 25 days before the scheduled expiration date of parliament and published on the following day in the Official Gazette of Aragon (BOA), with election day taking place 54 days after the decree's publication. The previous election was held on 28 May 2023, which meant that the chamber's term would have expired on 28 May 2027. The election decree was required to be published in the BOA no later than 4 May 2027, setting the latest possible date for election day on 27 June 2027.

The regional president had the prerogative to dissolve the Cortes of Aragon at any given time and call a snap election, provided that no motion of no confidence was in process and that dissolution did not occur before one year after a previous one. In the event of an investiture process failing to elect a regional president within a two-month period from the Cortes's reconvening, the chamber was to be automatically dissolved and a fresh election called.

Speculation emerged in September 2025 that the national leadership of the PP was planning to advance the elections in Aragon and Extremadura (and possibly the Balearic Islands) to make them take place near or concurrently with the Castilian-Leonese election scheduled for early 2026, in an electoral "Super Sunday". While the alleged justification would be the regional governments' failure to approve their 2026 budgets, the true motive was attributed to PP plans—not without risk—to turn the simultaneous election call into a referendum on the national government of Prime Minister Pedro Sánchez. Regional president Jorge Azcón ruled out any plans of a joint election call with other regions, with his government allegedly focused on avoiding an election. Tensions between PP and Vox remained high, and a controversy over the dismissal of a Vox parliamentary advisor for online hate speech prompted the breakup of budget negotiations on 21 October. Vox was reportedly willing to take public blame for forcing early elections in Aragon and Extremadura. Azcón's government rejected an immediate election call following the announcement of a snap Extremaduran election for 21 December 2025, but this was attributed to him having his own timetable—unlike in Extremadura, budgetary procedures had not yet begun in Aragon—rather than a lack of willingness for a 2026 election. Throughout November 2025, Azcón hinted at a failure in budget negotiations leading to an early parliamentary dissolution, with a possible election date being considered for February 2026, so as to prevent a simultaneous call with Castile and León in March. February was hinted at as the most likely month for a snap election, with various Spanish outlets confirming on 12 December that the dissolution decree would be signed the next Monday for an election to be held on 8 February.

The Cortes of Aragon was officially dissolved on 16 December 2025 with the publication of the corresponding decree in the BOA, setting election day for 8 February and scheduling for the chamber to reconvene on 3 March.

=== Electoral system ===
Voting for the Cortes was based on universal suffrage, comprising all Spanish nationals over 18 years of age, registered in Aragon and with full political rights, provided that they had not been deprived of the right to vote by a final sentence.

The Cortes of Aragon had a minimum of 65 and a maximum of 80 seats, with electoral provisions fixing its size at 67. All were elected in three multi-member constituencies—corresponding to the provinces of Huesca, Teruel and Zaragoza, each of which was assigned an initial minimum of 14 seats and the remaining 25 distributed in proportion to population (with the seat-to-population ratio in the most populated province not exceeding three times that of the least populated one)—using the D'Hondt method and closed-list proportional voting, with a three percent-threshold of valid votes (including blank ballots) in each constituency. The use of this electoral method resulted in a higher effective threshold depending on district magnitude and vote distribution.

As a result of the aforementioned allocation, each Cortes constituency was entitled the following seats:

Seats	Constituencies
35	Zaragoza
18	Huesca
14	Teruel

The law did not provide for by-elections to fill vacant seats; instead, any vacancies arising after the proclamation of candidates and during the legislative term were filled by the next candidates on the party lists or, when required, by designated substitutes.

=== Outgoing parliament ===
The table below shows the composition of the parliamentary groups in the chamber at the time of dissolution.

Parliamentary composition in December 2025
Groups	Parties	Legislators	
Groups	Parties	Seats	Total
People's Parliamentary Group in the Cortes of Aragon	PP	28	28
Socialist Parliamentary Group	PSOE	23	23
Vox Parliamentary Group	Vox	7	7
Aragonese Union Parliamentary Group	CHA	3	3
Aragon–Teruel Exists Parliamentary Group	TE	3	3
Mixed Parliamentary Group	Podemos	1	3
Mixed Parliamentary Group	IU	1	3
Mixed Parliamentary Group	PAR	1	3

== Parties and candidates ==
The electoral law allowed for parties and federations registered in the interior ministry, alliances and groupings of electors to present lists of candidates. Parties and federations intending to form an alliance were required to inform the relevant electoral commission within 10 days of the election call, whereas groupings of electors needed to secure the signature of at least one percent of the electorate in the constituencies for which they sought election, disallowing electors from signing for more than one list. Amendments in 2024 required a balanced composition of men and women in the electoral lists through the use of a zipper system.

Below is a list of the main parties and alliances which will likely contest the election:

Candidacy	Parties and alliances	Leading candidate	Ideology	Previous result		Gov.	Ref.
Candidacy	Parties and alliances	Leading candidate	Ideology	Vote %	Seats	Gov.	Ref.
PP	List: People's Party (PP)	Jorge Azcón	Conservatism; Christian democracy	35.5%	28	Yes	
PSOE	List: Spanish Socialist Workers' Party (PSOE)	Pilar Alegría	Social democracy	29.6%	23	No	
Vox	List: Vox (Vox)	Alejandro Nolasco	Right-wing populism Ultranationalism; National conservatism	11.2%	7	No	
CHA	List: Aragonese Union (CHA); Greens Equo–Green Party (VQ–PV)	Jorge Pueyo	Aragonese nationalism Eco-socialism	5.3%	3	No	
Existe	List: Teruel Exists (TE); Aragon Exists (AE)	Tomás Guitarte	Localism; Ruralism	5.0%	3	No	
Podemos–AV	List: We Can (Podemos); Green Alliance (AV)	María Goicoechea	Left-wing populism Direct democracy Democratic socialism	4.0%	1	No	
IU–MS	List: United Left of Aragon (IU) – Communist Party of Aragon (PCE–A) – The Dawn Marxist Organization (La Aurora (OM)) – Republican Left (IR); Unite Movement (SMR)	Marta Abengochea	Socialism; Communism; Progressivism	3.1%	1	No	
PAR	List: Aragonese Party (PAR)	Alberto Izquierdo	Regionalism; Centrism	2.1%	1	Yes	
SALF	List: The Party is Over (SALF)	Cristina Falcón	Right-wing populism Anti-establishment	Did not contest		No	

== Campaign ==
=== Timetable ===
The key dates are listed below (all times are CET):

- 15 December: The election decree is issued with the countersign of the president, after deliberation in the Government.
- 16 December: Formal dissolution of parliament and start of prohibition period on the inauguration of public works, services or projects.
- 19 December: Initial constitution of provincial and zone electoral commissions with judicial members.
- 22 December: Division of constituencies into polling sections and stations.
- 26 December: Deadline for parties and federations to report on their electoral alliances.
- 29 December: Deadline for electoral register consultation for the purpose of possible corrections.
- 5 January: Deadline for parties, federations, alliances, and groupings of electors to present electoral lists.
- 7 January: Publication of submitted electoral lists in the Official Gazette of Aragon (BOA).
- 12 January: Official proclamation of validly submitted electoral lists.
- 13 January: Publication of proclaimed electoral lists in the BOA.
- 14 January: Deadline for the selection of polling station members by sortition.
- 22 January: Deadline for the appointment of non-judicial members to provincial and zone electoral commissions.
- 23 January: Official start of electoral campaigning.
- 29 January: Deadline to apply for postal voting.
- 3 February: Start of legal ban on electoral opinion polling publication; deadline for non-resident citizens (electors residing abroad (CERA) and citizens temporarily absent from Spain) to vote by mail.
- 4 February: Deadline for postal and temporarily absent voting.
- 5 February: Deadline for CERA voting.
- 6 February: Last day of electoral campaigning.
- 7 February: Official election silence ("reflection day").
- 8 February: Election day (polling stations open at 9 am and close at 8 pm or once voters present in a queue at/outside the polling station at 8 pm have cast their vote); provisional vote counting.
- 13 February: Start of general vote counting, including CERA votes.
- 16 February: Deadline for the general vote counting.
- 25 February: Deadline for the proclamation of elected members.
- 10 March: Deadline for the reconvening of parliament (date determined by the election decree, which for the 2026 election was set for 3 March).
- 6 April: Deadline for the publication of definitive election results in the BOA.

=== Party slogans ===
Party or alliance	Original slogan	English translation	Ref.
PP	« Aragón imparable »	"Aragon unstoppable"	
PSOE	« Por Aragón. Por tus derechos »	"For Aragon. For your rights"	
Vox	« Sentido común »	"Common sense"	
CHA	« A favor de Aragón »	"In favour of Aragon"	
Existe	« Tú decides »	"You decide"	
Podemos–AV	« Con rasmia »	"With determination"	
IU–MS	« El valor de la gente »	"The value of people"	
PAR	« Aragón, primero »	"Aragon first"	

=== Debates ===
2026 Aragonese regional election debates
Date	Organizer(s)	Moderator(s)	P Present (Note: Denotes a main invitee attending the event.) S Surrogate (Note: Denotes a main invitee not attending the event, sending a surrogate in their place.) NI Not invited I Invited A Absent invitee									
Date	Organizer(s)	Moderator(s)	PP	PSOE	Vox	CHA	Existe	Podemos	IU–MS	PAR	Audience	Ref.
26 January	Aragón TV	Ana Laiglesia	P Azcón	P Alegría	NI	NI	NI	NI	NI	NI	25.8% (112,000) (Note: In Aragon, the debate was broadcast on Aragón TV (51,000; 11.7%) and La 1 and 24 Horas (61,000; 14.1%).)	
29 January	RTVE	Xabier Fortes	P Azcón	P Alegría	P Nolasco	P Pueyo	P Guitarte	P Goicoechea	P Abengochea	P Izquierdo	18.1% (79,000)	
2 February	Aragón TV	Ana Laiglesia	P Azcón	P Alegría	P Nolasco	P Pueyo	P Guitarte	P Goicoechea	P Abengochea	P Izquierdo	18.7% (72,000)	
4 February	El Periódico de Aragón	Laura Carnicero; Sergio H. Valgañón	P Azcón	P Alegría	P Nolasco	P Pueyo	P Guitarte	P Goicoechea	P Abengochea	P Izquierdo	—	

Opinion polls

Candidate viewed as "performing best" or "most convincing" in each debate
Debate	Polling firm/Commissioner	Sample	PP	PSOE	Vox	CHA	Existe	Pod.	IU–MS	PAR	Tie	None	Question
29 January	Heraldo de Aragón	2,100	41.5	23.9	7.0	11.4	1.6	1.5	7.3	5.8	–	–	–

== Opinion polls ==
The tables below list opinion polling results in reverse chronological order, showing the most recent first and using the dates when the survey fieldwork was done, as opposed to the date of publication. Where the fieldwork dates are unknown, the date of publication is given instead. The highest percentage figure in each polling survey is displayed with its background shaded in the leading party's colour. If a tie ensues, this is applied to the figures with the highest percentages. The "Lead" column on the right shows the percentage-point difference between the parties with the highest percentages in a poll.

=== Graphical summary ===
Local regression trend line of poll results from 28 May 2023 to 8 February 2026, with each line corresponding to a political party.

=== Voting intention estimates ===
The table below lists weighted voting intention estimates. Refusals are generally excluded from the party vote percentages, while question wording and the treatment of "don't know" responses and those not intending to vote may vary between polling organisations. When available, seat projections determined by the polling organisations are displayed below (or in place of) the percentages in a smaller font; 34 seats were required for an absolute majority in the Cortes of Aragon.

Color key:

Poll conducted after legal ban on opinion polls

Polling firm/Commissioner	Fieldwork date	Sample size	Turnout	PP	PSOE	Vox	CHA	Existe	Podemos	IU	PAR	Sumar	SALF	Lead
2026 regional election	8 Feb 2026	—N/a	65.1	34.2; 26	24.4; 18	17.8; 14	9.7; 6	3.5; 2	1.0; 0	3.0; 1	1.2; 0	(Note: Within IU.)	2.7; 0	9.8
Sigma Dos/El Mundo	8 Feb 2026	?	?	35.9; 26/28	22.5; 17/19	17.5; 12/14	7.9; 4/5	4.3; 2/3	1.5; 0	5.2; 1/2	2.3; 0		1.3; 0	13.4
SocioMétrica/El Español	6–7 Feb 2026	1,000	?	35.7; 28	22.8; 17	17.9; 13	8.2; 5	4.2; 3	1.5; 0	3.0; 1	1.5; 0		2.0; 0	12.9
GAD3/FORTA	23 Jan–6 Feb 2026	4,123	?	35.2; 26/29	22.7; 17/18	17.6; 13/14	8.7; 4/5	4.1; 2/3	1.7; 0	4.2; 1/2	1.5; 0		1.9; 0	12.5
Data10/Okdiario	1–2 Feb 2026	1,200	?	37.9; 29	23.1; 17	17.6; 14	7.4; 4	3.5; 2	? 0	3.9; 1	? 0		? 0	14.8
SocioMétrica/El Español	30 Jan–1 Feb 2026	1,000	?	35.7; 28/29	23.3; 17/18	17.5; 12/13	7.3; 3/4	4.0; 2/3	1.7; 0	3.3; 1	2.4; 0		2.4; 0	12.4
EM-Analytics/Electomanía	1 Jan–1 Feb 2026	1,598	?	37.7; 29	23.9; 18	17.9; 13	7.2; 4	3.1; 2	2.2; 0	3.8; 1	1.5; 0		1.8; 0	13.8
Target Point/El Debate	28–31 Jan 2026	1,005	?	36.9; 28/30	21.9; 16/18	17.2; 12/13	7.3; 4	3.5; 2/3	2.1; 0	4.5; 1/2	1.9; 0		2.7; 0/1	15.0
Sigma Dos/El Mundo	26–30 Jan 2026	1,346	?	37.8; 27/30	24.6; 17/19	17.1; 12/14	7.7; 4/6	3.3; 2	1.5; 0	4.3; 1/2	1.4; 0		0.8; 0	13.2
A+M/Heraldo de Aragón	26–29 Jan 2026	2,000	61.2	37.2; 28/29	24.2; 18/19	16.6; 12/13	6.7; 3/4	2.7; 2	2.2; 0	4.3; 1/2	1.4; 0		2.3; 0	13.0
GAD3/ABC	22–29 Jan 2026	1,001	?	36.4; 28	22.6; 18	16.5; 12	8.3; 5	4.3; 3	2.1; 0	3.6; 1	1.2; 0		? 0	13.8
40dB/Prisa	26–28 Jan 2026	1,000	?	37.6; 28/30	23.2; 17/18	17.0; 11/13	6.7; 3/4	3.8; 2/3	2.2; 0	4.5; 1/3	1.2; 0		–	14.4
GESOP/Prensa Ibérica	15–28 Jan 2026	800	62.6	37.0; 28/30	24.0; 18/20	16.0; 11/12	7.0; 4/5	4.5; 2/3	2.5; 0	4.2; 2/3	1.2; 0		1.2; 0	13.0
EM-Analytics/Electomanía	15 Dec–24 Jan 2026	1,642	?	39.5; 30	24.8; 18	17.6; 13	5.9; 3	3.5; 2	2.2; 0	3.6; 1	1.5; 0		–	15.2
Celeste-Tel/Onda Cero	20–23 Jan 2026	1,100	60.9	37.9; 30	23.6; 18	16.9; 12	7.5; 4	3.5; 2	2.4; 0	4.5; 1	1.8; 0		–	14.3
40dB/Prisa	16–20 Jan 2026	1,000	?	37.4; 27/30	25.0; 18/19	17.9; 12/13	5.7; 3	3.9; 2/3	2.0; 0/1	3.8; 1	1.3; 0/1		–	12.4
GAD3/Hoy Aragón	12–20 Jan 2026	1,207	?	37.0; 29	24.7; 18/20	15.1; 11/12	6.7; 3/4	4.4; 2/3	2.0; 0	4.2; 1/2	? 0		? 0	12.3
A+M/Heraldo de Aragón	15–18 Jan 2026	2,000	63.7	38.6; 29/30	24.8; 18/19	14.7; 10/11	5.7; 3	3.4; 2/3	2.5; 0/1	3.3; 1	1.5; 0/1		3.2; 0/1	13.8
EM-Analytics/Electomanía	15 Dec–17 Jan 2026	1,012	?	39.8; 31	24.6; 17	18.2; 13	5.5; 3	3.5; 2	2.2; 0	3.1; 1	1.7; 0		–	15.2
SocioMétrica/El Español	14–16 Jan 2026	1,000	?	36.7; 29/30	25.0; 18/20	16.3; 11/12	6.0; 3	3.3; 2	2.7; 0/1	3.4; 1	2.0; 0/1		1.6; 0	11.7
NC Report/La Razón	8–16 Jan 2026	1,000	62.9	39.9; 30/31	23.1; 17/18	17.6; 12/13	5.6; 3	3.6; 2	3.2; 1	3.5; 1	? 0		–	16.8
CIS (Target Point) (Note: Alternative projection based on raw CIS data.)	12–15 Jan 2026	3,313	?	37.0; 29/30	22.8; 17/18	16.1; 11/13	8.3; 4/5	3.6; 2	2.1; 0	3.5; 1	1.5; 0/1		2.3; 0	14.2
CIS	12–15 Jan 2026	3,313	?	35.3; 25/29	26.7; 17/23	15.1; 10/13	6.9; 3/5	2.2; 1/2	2.5; 0/1	5.0; 1/3	1.5; 0		2.0; 0	8.6
Sigma Dos/El Mundo	8–15 Jan 2026	1,716	?	38.1; 28/30	25.8; 18/20	15.8; 12/13	7.5; 4/5	2.5; 2	2.2; 0/1	4.5; 1/2	1.5; 0		0.8; 0	12.3
Hamalgama Métrica/Vozpópuli	9–14 Jan 2026	1,000	64.7	39.4; 30	23.4; 17	17.8; 13	5.7; 3	3.8; 2	3.0; 1	3.7; 1	1.5; 0		–	16.0
EM-Analytics/Electomanía	11 Dec–11 Jan 2026	864	?	40.3; 31	24.8; 18	17.3; 12	5.7; 3	3.7; 2	2.7; 0	3.6; 1	1.7; 0		–	15.5
EM-Analytics/Electomanía	1 Dec–3 Jan 2026	1,228	?	39.9; 29	25.8; 19	17.1; 12	5.3; 3	3.7; 2	2.9; 1	3.6; 1	1.5; 0		–	14.1
SyM Consulting	20–24 Dec 2025	2,200	69.2	39.5; 29	24.5; 18/19	17.8; 12/14	4.9; 2/3	4.3; 3	3.1; 1/2	2.2; 0	1.7; 0/1	–	–	15.0
A+M/Heraldo de Aragón	15–18 Dec 2025	1,800	68.6	39.2; 29/30	25.8; 17/19	15.5; 11/12	5.8; 3	3.9; 2/3	6.1; 3/4	(Note: Within Podemos.)	1.5; 0	–	–	13.4
EM-Analytics/Electomanía	1–13 Dec 2025	804	?	43.2; 31	28.9; 21	12.6; 9	4.6; 3	2.9; 2	2.0; 0	3.7; 1	1.5; 0	–	–	14.3
SocioMétrica/El Español	24–28 Nov 2025	1,200	?	38.2; 30/31	23.9; 17/18	16.9; 11	4.7; 2	4.3; 3	3.5; 1	4.8; 2	0.9; 0	–	–	14.3
Sigma Dos/PP	15–30 Jun 2025	1,300	?	40.6; 31/32	24.1; 17/19	12.1; 7/9	6.5; 3/4	2.6; 1/2	2.8; 0/1	5.3; 2/3	1.7; 0/1	–	–	16.5
NC Report/La Razón	16–31 May 2025	350	64.4	? 30	? 20	? 8	? 4	? 2	? 1	? 1	? 1	–	–	?
Sigma Dos/El Mundo	14–25 Apr 2025	1,039	?	37.3; 28/30	25.8; 18/20	12.6; 8/9	6.4; 3/4	3.3; 2/3	2.8; 1	4.3; 1/2	1.9; 1	–	–	11.5
SocioMétrica/El Español	7–11 Apr 2025	1,200	?	37.9; 30	26.2; 20	13.5; 9	3.9; 2	4.9; 4	3.0; 1	4.2; 1	1.1; 0	–	–	11.7
A+M/Heraldo de Aragón	2–10 Apr 2025	2,400	67.4	43.6; 32	31.1; 24	10.1; 6	5.2; 3	2.4; 2	1.7; 0	2.4; 0	1.0; 0	–	–	12.5
SocioMétrica/El Español	1–6 Oct 2024	1,500	?	39.9; 33	29.7; 24	9.0; 6	4.0; 1	4.2; 3	2.0; 0	2.5; 0	1.4; 0	2.7; 0	–	10.2
NC Report/La Razón	15–18 Jul 2024	1,000	68.9	40.8; 32	30.4; 23	8.9; 6	5.2; 3	3.9; 2	2.6; 0	3.6; 1	1.4; 0	–	–	10.4
A+M/Heraldo de Aragón	12–15 Jul 2024	1,600	68.1	40.6; 30	35.1; 26	9.8; 6	5.5; 3	2.7; 2	0.9; 0	1.1; 0	2.4; 0	–	–	5.5
Data10/Okdiario	12–13 Jul 2024	1,500	?	37.4; 31	31.6; 26	10.1; 7	4.1; 1	4.1; 2	–	–	–	–	–	5.4
2024 EP election	9 Jun 2024	—N/a	51.1	37.1 (28)	30.3 (23)	11.5 (8)	(Note: Within Sumar.)	2.9 (1)	3.1 (1)		–	5.1 (3)	5.1 (3)	6.8
A+M/Heraldo de Aragón	10–16 Apr 2024	2,400	68.6	40.2; 31	30.7; 23	12.0; 8	5.4; 3	2.7; 2	1.7; 0	2.6; 0	1.0; 0	–	–	9.5
2023 general election	23 Jul 2023	—N/a	70.7	36.3 (26)	31.1 (23)	14.6 (9)		2.9 (2)			0.6 (0)	12.3 (7)	–	5.2
2023 regional election	28 May 2023	—N/a	66.5	35.5; 28	29.6; 23	11.2; 7	5.1; 3	5.0; 3	4.0; 1	3.1; 1	2.1; 1	–	–	5.9

=== Voting preferences ===
The table below lists raw, unweighted voting preferences.

Polling firm/Commissioner	Fieldwork date	Sample size	PP	PSOE	Vox	CHA	Existe	Podemos	IU	PAR	Sumar	SALF	Question	X mark	Lead
2026 regional election (Note: Does not include non-resident citizens.)	8 Feb 2026	—N/a	22.9	16.3	12.0	6.5	2.4	0.6	2.0	0.8		1.8	—N/a	32.4	6.6
40dB/Prisa	26–28 Jan 2026	1,000	22.7	14.2	15.1	5.6	3.7	2.2	4.9	0.7		–	19.1	5.1	7.6
GESOP/Prensa Ibérica	15–28 Jan 2026	800	24.6	17.8	11.7	5.6	2.1	1.3	3.8	0.7		1.1	21.4	5.0	6.8
40dB/Prisa	16–20 Jan 2026	1,000	22.6	17.2	14.7	5.0	3.7	1.7	3.3	1.1		–	18.9	6.7	5.4
SocioMétrica/El Español	14–16 Jan 2026	1,000	26.9	18.8	16.4	5.8	3.4	3.9	2.4	1.2		–	11.9	4.8	8.1
CIS	12–15 Jan 2026	3,313	27.8	21.5	12.0	5.4	1.6	1.8	3.5	1.1		1.6	17.2	3.3	6.3
SocioMétrica/El Español	24–28 Nov 2025	1,200	25.9	17.4	15.4	3.8	3.7	4.1	2.2	0.8	–	–	12.1	9.7	8.5
SocioMétrica/El Español	7–11 Apr 2025	1,200	30.0	19.0	13.0	4.0	4.0	5.0	6.0	1.0	–	–	6.0	7.0	11.0
CIS	7–31 Mar 2025	888	28.2	25.6	9.1	2.8	0.8	2.0	2.7	1.0	1.9	0.7	19.1	3.0	2.6
2024 EP election	9 Jun 2024	—N/a	19.5	15.9	6.1		1.5	1.6		–	2.7	2.7	—N/a	47.1	3.6
2023 general election	23 Jul 2023	—N/a	26.3	22.5	10.6		2.1			0.4	8.9	–	—N/a	27.0	3.8
2023 regional election	28 May 2023	—N/a	23.9	19.9	7.6	3.4	3.4	2.7	2.1	1.4	–	–	—N/a	30.8	4.0

=== Victory preferences ===
The table below lists opinion polling on the victory preferences for each party in the event of a regional election taking place.

Polling firm/Commissioner	Fieldwork date	Sample size	PP	PSOE	Vox	CHA	Existe	Podemos	IU	PAR	SALF	Other/ None	Question	Lead
CIS	12–15 Jan 2026	3,313	32.2	25.4	12.2	5.9	1.8	1.9	4.3	1.5	1.3	4.4	9.1	6.8

=== Victory likelihood ===
The table below lists opinion polling on the perceived likelihood of victory for each party in the event of a regional election taking place.

Polling firm/Commissioner	Fieldwork date	Sample size	PP	PSOE	Vox	SALF	Other/ None	Question	Lead
GAD3/Hoy Aragón	12–20 Jan 2026	1,207	80.0	6.0	4.0	–	10.0		74.0
CIS	12–15 Jan 2026	3,313	74.9	8.0	3.7	0.6	0.7	12.2	66.9

=== Preferred President ===
The table below lists opinion polling on leader preferences to become president of the Government of Aragon.

All candidates

Polling firm/Commissioner	Fieldwork date	Sample size													Other/ None/ Not care	Question	Lead
Polling firm/Commissioner	Fieldwork date	Sample size	Azcón PP	Lambán PSOE	Alegría PSOE	Nolasco Vox	Soro CHA	Pueyo CHA	Guitarte Existe	Corrales Podemos	Goico. Podemos	Sanz IU	Abengo. IU	Izquierdo PAR	Other/ None/ Not care	Question	Lead
40dB/Prisa	26–28 Jan 2026	1,000	26.0	–	16.6	14.3	–	7.3	4.6	–	2.4	–	4.2	0.9	10.7	13.1	9.4
GESOP/Prensa Ibérica	15–28 Jan 2026	800	32.9	–	20.7	5.6	–	6.6	1.8	–	1.1	–	1.1	0.9	9.4	19.9	12.2
40dB/Prisa	16–20 Jan 2026	1,000	28.2	–	19.3	13.9	–	7.0	4.6	–	2.0	–	3.1	1.3	9.0	11.7	8.9
GAD3/Hoy Aragón	12–20 Jan 2026	1,207	39.0	–	19.0	9.0	–	–	–	–	–	–	–	–	–	–	20.0
SocioMétrica/El Español	14–16 Jan 2026	1,000	26.0	–	17.1	13.7	–	6.8	3.9	–	1.8	–	4.7	1.3	–	22.9	8.9
CIS	12–15 Jan 2026	3,313	34.4	–	21.8	9.0	–	5.5	1.5	–	1.6	–	2.8	0.7	7.3	15.5	12.6
SocioMétrica/El Español	24–28 Nov 2025	1,200	30.7	–	17.7	11.6	5.0	–	4.5	2.1	–	2.0	–	1.9	–	24.5	13.0
SocioMétrica/El Español	7–11 Apr 2025	1,200	30.0	–	16.4	11.8	4.7	–	6.4	1.5	–	3.5	–	1.5	–	24.4	13.6
CIS (Note: Responses denoting a party's generic candidate are aggregated to that party's main candidate/leader at the time of the poll.)	7–31 Mar 2025	888	27.6	1.8	18.3	4.3	–	0.7	–	0.6	–	1.4	–	–	6.2	39.0	9.3

Azcón vs. Alegría

Polling firm/Commissioner	Fieldwork date	Sample size			Other/ None/ Not care	Question	Lead
Polling firm/Commissioner	Fieldwork date	Sample size	Azcón PP	Alegría PSOE	Other/ None/ Not care	Question	Lead
SocioMétrica/El Español	30 Jan–1 Feb 2026	1,000	41.8	33.2	–	25.0	8.6
SocioMétrica/El Español	14–16 Jan 2026	1,000	43.8	32.0	–	24.2	11.8
SocioMétrica/El Español	24–28 Nov 2025	1,200	46.0	28.3	–	25.7	17.7
SocioMétrica/El Español	7–11 Apr 2025	1,200	45.6	30.9	–	23.5	14.7

=== Predicted President ===
The table below lists opinion polling on the perceived likelihood for each leader to become president.

Polling firm/Commissioner	Fieldwork date	Sample size			Other/ None/ Not care	Question	Lead
Polling firm/Commissioner	Fieldwork date	Sample size	Azcón PP	Alegría PSOE	Other/ None/ Not care	Question	Lead
SocioMétrica/El Español	30 Jan–1 Feb 2026	1,000	57.6	20.5	–	21.9	37.1
SocioMétrica/El Español	14–16 Jan 2026	1,000	60.9	18.2	–	20.9	42.7
SocioMétrica/El Español	24–28 Nov 2025	1,200	50.5	21.6	–	27.9	28.9
SocioMétrica/El Español	7–11 Apr 2025	1,200	50.3	25.5	–	24.2	24.8

== Voter turnout ==
The table below shows registered voter turnout during the election. Figures for election day do not include non-resident citizens, while final figures do.

Province	Time (Election day)										Final		
Province	11:00	14:00			18:00			20:00			Final		
Province	2026	2023	2026	+/–	2023	2026	+/–	2023	2026	+/–	2023	2026	+/–
Huesca	10.44%	39.61%	37.73%	−1.88	53.45%	52.86%	−0.59	68.80%	64.81%	−3.99	65.66%	61.82%	−3.84
Teruel	10.78%	42.89%	39.78%	−3.11	59.14%	55.49%	−3.65	74.59%	67.59%	−7.00	70.71%	64.36%	−6.35
Zaragoza	10.96%	40.99%	41.80%	+0.81	54.41%	57.19%	+2.78	69.64%	68.20%	−1.44	66.15%	65.95%	−0.20
Total	10.85%	40.96%	40.91%	−0.05	54.73%	56.29%	+1.56	70.01%	67.57%	−2.44	66.54%	65.09%	−1.45

== Results ==
=== Overall ===
← Summary of the 8 February 2026 Cortes of Aragon election results
Parties and alliances	Popular vote			Seats	
Parties and alliances	Votes	%	±pp	Total	+/−
People's Party (PP)	228,388	34.17	−1.34	26	−2
Spanish Socialist Workers' Party (PSOE)	162,925	24.38	−5.17	18	−5
Vox (Vox)	119,281	17.85	+6.60	14	+7
Aragonese Union (CHA)^{1}	65,118	9.74	+4.47	6	+3
Exists Coalition (Existe)	23,616	3.53	−1.43	2	−1
United Left–Unite Movement (IU–MS)	19,832	2.97	−0.16	1	±0
The Party is Over (SALF)	18,256	2.73	New	0	±0
Aragonese Party (PAR)	8,329	1.25	−0.84	0	−1
We Can–Green Alliance (Podemos–AV)	6,478	0.97	−3.05	0	−1
Blank Seats to Leave Empty Seats (EB)	4,238	0.63	+0.20	0	±0
Animalist Party with the Environment (PACMA)	2,742	0.41	−0.09	0	±0
For a Fairer World (M+J)	535	0.08	New	0	±0
Communist Party of the Workers of Spain (PCTE)	518	0.08	−0.05	0	±0
Aragonese Coalition (Coalición Aragonesa)^{2}	500	0.07	−0.12	0	±0
Lower Cinca Between Everyone (ETXSBC)	228	0.03	−0.05	0	±0
Blank ballots	7,315	1.09	−0.53		
Total	668,299			67	±0
Valid votes	668,299	99.07	+0.30		
Invalid votes	6,271	0.93	−0.30		
Votes cast / turnout	674,570	65.09	−1.45		
Abstentions	361,761	34.91	+1.45		
Registered voters	1,036,331				
Sources
Footnotes: ^{1} Aragonese Union results are compared to the combined totals of Aragonese Union and Greens Equo in the 2023 election.; ^{2} Aragonese Coalition results are compared to the Federation of Independents of Aragon totals in the 2023 election.

Popular vote
PP	34.17%
PSOE	24.38%
Vox	17.85%
CHA	9.74%
Existe	3.53%
IU–MS	2.97%
SALF	2.73%
PAR	1.25%
Others	2.28%
Blank ballots	1.09%

Seats
PP	38.81%
PSOE	26.87%
Vox	20.90%
CHA	8.96%
Existe	2.99%
IU–MS	1.49%

=== Distribution by constituency ===
Constituency	PP		PSOE		Vox		CHA		Existe		IU–MS	
Constituency	%	S	%	S	%	S	%	S	%	S	%	S
Huesca	32.7	7	26.9	5	18.7	4	9.8	2	2.2	−	2.6	−
Teruel	28.7	5	23.7	4	20.3	3	3.9	−	12.9	2	1.8	−
Zaragoza	35.2	14	23.9	9	17.3	7	10.5	4	2.5	−	3.2	1
Total	34.2	26	24.4	18	17.8	14	9.7	6	3.5	2	3.0	1

== Aftermath ==
=== Government formation ===
Investiture; Nomination of Jorge Azcón (PP)
Ballot →	29 April 2026
Required majority →	34 out of 67
Yes: • PP (26); • Vox (13)	39 / 67
No: • PSOE (18); • CHA (6); • Existe (2); • IU (1)	27 / 67
Abstentions	0 / 67
Absentees: • Vox (1)	1 / 67

== Bibliography ==
- Ley Orgánica 5/1985, de 19 de junio, del Régimen Electoral General (Organic Law 5/1985). Official State Gazette (in Spanish). 19 June 1985 [version as of 14 July 2025]. BOE-A-1985-11672.
- Ley 2/1987, de 16 de febrero, Electoral de la Comunidad Autónoma de Aragón (Law 2/1987). Official State Gazette (in Spanish). 16 February 1987 [version as of 28 February 2023]. BOE-A-1987-5339.
- Ley Orgánica 5/2007, de 20 de abril, de reforma del Estatuto de Autonomía de Aragón (Organic Law 5/2007). Official State Gazette (in Spanish). 20 April 2007 [version as of 28 December 2022]. BOE-A-2007-8444.
- Decreto Legislativo 1/2022, de 6 de abril, del Gobierno de Aragón, por el que se aprueba el texto refundido de la Ley del Presidente o Presidenta y del Gobierno de Aragón (Legislative Decree 1/2022). Official State Gazette (in Spanish). 6 April 2022 [version as of 20 April 2022]. BOE-A-2022-7004.
- Decreto de 15 de diciembre de 2025, del Presidente de Aragón, por el que se convocan elecciones a las Cortes de Aragón (Decree). Official Gazette of Aragon (in Spanish). 15 December 2025. BOA20251216001.
