= Emma Buj =

Spanish politician

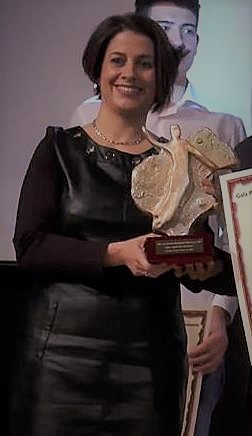

María Emma Buj Sánchez (born 10 May 1972) is a Spanish People's Party (PP) politician. She was elected to the city council in Teruel in 2003 and became its mayor in 2016. In 2023, she was elected to the Senate of Spain.

== Early and personal life ==
Buj was born in Teruel in Aragon. Her father was an auditor for the city council, who introduced her to local politics. She graduated with a degree in social work from the Teruel campus of the University of Zaragoza, and in 1995 began working as a civil servant in the Provincial Deputation.

Buj has a daughter born in 2005, and a son born in 2010.

== Political career ==
Buj first ran on a People's Party (PP) list for election to Teruel City Council in 1999, and was elected in 2003. In those elections, the Spanish Socialist Workers' Party (PSOE) took the mayor's office, and Buj became the PP spokesperson. In 2007–2011, as the Aragonese Party (PAR) governed, she retained her spokesperson role and was also a member of the provincial deputation.

Manuel Blasco Marqués of the PP became mayor of Teruel in 2010. Re-elected in 2015, he named Buj as his deputy and the councillor in charge of urban planning. At the start of 2016, he resigned to focus on his role in the Congress of Deputies, and Buj succeeded him, with the PP voting in her favour and Citizens (Cs) abstaining. In the 2019 local elections, the PP lost one seat to seven, but parties of the right held 13 out of 21 seats on the council. In the investiture session, she received 11 votes (PP, Cs, Vox) as the two members from PAR voted for their own candidacy.

Buj was re-elected in 2023 in May with an absolute majority, as the PP won 11 of 21 seats. She called for co-operation with the other parties: Teruel Exists for commitment to local issues, PSOE for ending polarisation in politics, and Vox due to pacts between PP and Vox around the country. Around 200 people protested outside the city hall during her investiture in June, due to what they saw as mismanagement concerning the collapse of a residential building.

In the 2023 Spanish general election in July, Buj was the most voted candidate in the Teruel constituency for the Senate of Spain, as the PP took three of its four seats.
