= Manuel Blasco =

Manuel Blasco may refer to:

- Manuel Blasco de Nebra (1750–1784), Spanish composer
- Manuel Blasco Marqués (born 1960), Spanish politician
