= Laura Vergara =

Spanish politician (born 1986)

Member of the Congress of Deputies
- Incumbent
- Assumed office 10 February 2026
- Preceded by: Jorge Pueyo
- Constituency: Zaragoza

Personal details
- Born: 18 June 1986 (age 39)
- Party: Movimiento Sumar

Laura Vergara Román (born 18 June 1986) is a Spanish politician serving as a member of the Congress of Deputies since 2026. From 2017 to 2025, she served as national spokesperson of the cycling movement.
