= Teruel (Congress of Deputies constituency) =

Electoral constituency in Spain

Coordinates: 40°40′N 0°40′W

- Congress of Deputies; Electoral constituency
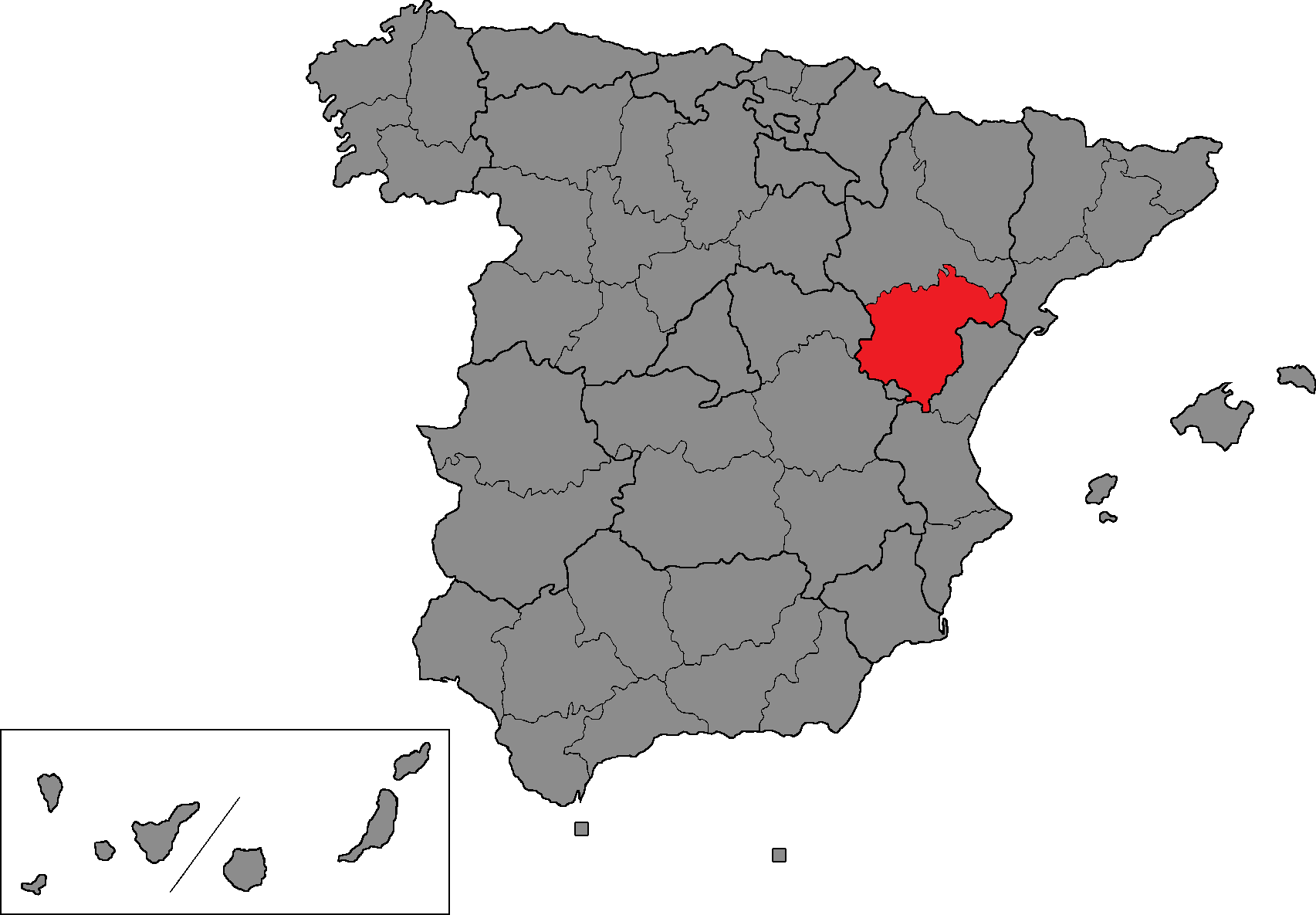
- Location of Teruel within Spain
- Province: Teruel
- Autonomous community: Aragon
- Population: ▲135,661 (2024)
- Electorate: ▼106,352 (2023)
- Major settlements: Teruel

Current constituency
- Created: 1977
- Seats: 3
- Members: PP (2); PSOE (1)

Teruel is one of the 52 constituencies represented in the Congress of Deputies, the lower chamber of the Spanish parliament, the Cortes Generales. The constituency (whose boundaries correspond to those of the homonymous province) currently elects three deputies. The electoral system uses the D'Hondt method and closed-list proportional voting, with a minimum threshold of three percent.

== Electoral system ==
The constituency was created as per the Political Reform Law and was first contested in the 1977 general election. The Law provided for the provinces of Spain to be established as multi-member districts in the Congress of Deputies, with this regulation being maintained under the Spanish Constitution of 1978. Additionally, the Constitution requires for any modification of the provincial limits to be approved under an organic law, needing an absolute majority in the Cortes Generales.

Voting is based on universal suffrage, comprising all Spanish nationals over 18 years of age with full political rights, provided that they have not been deprived of the right to vote by a final sentence. The only exception was in 1977, when this was limited to nationals over 21 years of age and in full enjoyment of their political and civil rights. Amendments in 2011 required non-resident citizens to apply for voting, a system known as "begged" voting (Spanish: Voto rogado). which was abolished in 2022. Further, amendments in 2018 granted the right to vote to those legally incapacitated. The Congress of Deputies has a minimum of 300 and a maximum of 400 seats, with electoral provisions fixing its size at 350. Of these, 348 are elected in 50 multi-member constituencies corresponding to the provinces of Spain—each of which is assigned an initial minimum of two seats and the remaining 248 distributed in proportion to population—using the D'Hondt method and closed-list proportional voting, with a three percent-threshold of valid votes (including blank ballots) in each constituency. The remaining two seats are allocated to Ceuta and Melilla as single-member districts elected by plurality voting. The use of this electoral method may result in a higher effective threshold depending on district magnitude and vote distribution. The law does not provide for by-elections to fill vacant seats; instead, any vacancies arising after the proclamation of candidates and during the legislative term are filled by the next candidates on the party lists or, when required, by designated substitutes.

The electoral law allows for parties and federations registered in the interior ministry, alliances and groupings of electors to present lists of candidates. Parties and federations intending to form an alliance are required to inform the relevant electoral commission within 10 days of the election call—15 before 1985—whereas groupings of electors need to secure the signature of at least one percent of the electorate in the constituencies for which they seek election—one permille of the electorate, with a compulsory minimum of 500 signatures, until 1985—disallowing electors from signing for more than one list. Also since 2011, parties, federations or alliances that have not obtained a mandate in either chamber of the Cortes at the preceding election are required to secure the signature of at least 0.1 percent of electors in the aforementioned constituencies. Amendments in 2007 required a balanced composition of men and women in the electoral lists, so that candidates of either sex made up at least 40 percent of the total composition; further amendments in 2024 required the use of a zipper system.

== Deputies ==
Deputies 1977–present
Key to parties PSOE TE Cs UCD PP CP AP
Legislature	Election	Distribution
Constituent	1977	1 / 2
1st	1979	1 / 2
2nd	1982	2 / 1
3rd	1986	2 / 1
4th	1989	2 / 1
5th	1993	2 / 1
6th	1996	1 / 2
7th	2000	1 / 2
8th	2004	2 / 1
9th	2008	2 / 1
10th	2011	1 / 2
11th	2015	1 / 2
12th	2016	1 / 2
13th	2019 (Apr)	1 / 1 / 1
14th	2019 (Nov)	1 / 1 / 1
15th	2023	1 / 2

== General elections ==
=== 2026 ===
Summary of the 29 November 2026 Congress of Deputies election results in Teruel
Parties and alliances	Popular vote			Seats	
Parties and alliances	Votes	%	±pp	Total	+/−
People's Party (PP)					
Spanish Socialist Workers' Party (PSOE)					
Teruel Exists (TE)					
Vox (Vox)					
Animalist Party with the Environment (PACMA)					
Workers' Front (FO)					
Communist Party of the Workers of Spain (PCTE)					
The Party is Over (SALF)			New		
Spanish Phalanx of the CNSO (FE de las JONS)			New		
We Can (Podemos)			New		
Blank ballots					
Total				3	±0
Valid votes					
Invalid votes					
Votes cast / turnout					
Abstentions					
Registered voters	106,251				

=== 2023 ===
Summary of the 23 July 2023 Congress of Deputies election results in Teruel
Parties and alliances	Popular vote			Seats	
Parties and alliances	Votes	%	±pp	Total	+/−
People's Party (PP)	26,586	35.02	+11.39	2	+1
Spanish Socialist Workers' Party (PSOE)	22,226	29.28	+3.74	1	±0
Teruel Exists–Exists Coalition (Existe)	11,348	14.95	–11.71	0	–1
Vox (Vox)	9,932	13.08	+0.47	0	±0
Unite Aragon (Sumar Aragón)^{1}	4,126	5.44	+0.07	0	±0
Aragonese Party (PAR)	711	0.94	New	0	±0
Animalist Party with the Environment (PACMA)^{2}	172	0.23	–0.06	0	±0
Blank Seats to Leave Empty Seats (EB)	135	0.18	New	0	±0
Workers' Front (FO)	94	0.12	New	0	±0
Communist Party of the Workers of Spain (PCTE)	60	0.08	New	0	±0
Zero Cuts (Recortes Cero)	49	0.06	+0.06	0	±0
For a Fairer World (PUM+J)	36	0.05	±0.00	0	±0
Federation of Independents of Aragon (FIA)	28	0.04	New	0	±0
Blank ballots	410	0.54	–0.18		
Total	75,913			3	±0
Valid votes	75,913	99.15	–0.14		
Invalid votes	648	0.85	+0.14		
Votes cast / turnout	76,561	71.99	+2.52		
Abstentions	29,791	28.01	–2.52		
Registered voters	106,352				
Sources
Footnotes: ^{1} Unite Aragon results are compared to United We Can totals in the November 2019 election.; ^{2} Animalist Party with the Environment results are compared to Animalist Party Against Mistreatment of Animals totals in the November 2019 election.

=== November 2019 ===
Summary of the 10 November 2019 Congress of Deputies election results in Teruel
Parties and alliances	Popular vote			Seats	
Parties and alliances	Votes	%	±pp	Total	+/−
Teruel Exists (¡TE!)	19,761	26.66	New	1	+1
Spanish Socialist Workers' Party (PSOE)	18,934	25.54	–7.28	1	±0
People's Party (PP)	17,520	23.63	–0.15	1	±0
Vox (Vox)	9,346	12.61	+1.93	0	±0
United We Can (Podemos–IU)	3,982	5.37	–5.16	0	±0
Citizens–Party of the Citizenry (Cs)	3,732	5.03	–14.64	0	–1
Animalist Party Against Mistreatment of Animals (PACMA)	212	0.29	–0.29	0	±0
Spanish Communist Workers' Party (PCOE)	96	0.13	New	0	±0
Communist Party of the Peoples of Spain (PCPE)	45	0.06	–0.06	0	±0
For a Fairer World (PUM+J)	35	0.05	–0.04	0	±0
Union of Everyone (UdT)	26	0.04	±0.00	0	±0
Puyalón (PYLN)	25	0.03	–0.05	0	±0
At Once Valencian Community (aUna CV)	13	0.02	New	0	±0
Zero Cuts–Green Group (Recortes Cero–GV)	0	0.00	–0.14	0	±0
Blank ballots	403	0.54	–0.51		
Total	74,130			3	±0
Valid votes	74,130	99.29	+0.98		
Invalid votes	531	0.71	–0.98		
Votes cast / turnout	74,661	69.47	–4.26		
Abstentions	32,806	30.53	+4.26		
Registered voters	107,467				

=== April 2019 ===
Summary of the 28 April 2019 Congress of Deputies election results in Teruel
Parties and alliances	Popular vote			Seats	
Parties and alliances	Votes	%	±pp	Total	+/−
Spanish Socialist Workers' Party (PSOE)	25,629	32.82	+6.49	1	±0
People's Party (PP)	18,566	23.78	–17.48	1	–1
Citizens–Party of the Citizenry (Cs)	15,357	19.67	+6.49	1	+1
Vox (Vox)	8,336	10.68	New	0	±0
United We Can (Podemos–IU–Equo)	8,224	10.53	–6.23	0	±0
Animalist Party Against Mistreatment of Animals (PACMA)	452	0.58	+0.04	0	±0
Blank Seats (EB)	272	0.35	+0.02	0	±0
Zero Cuts–Green Group (Recortes Cero–GV)	113	0.14	–0.03	0	±0
Communist Party of the Peoples of Spain (PCPE)	96	0.12	+0.03	0	±0
For a Fairer World (PUM+J)	74	0.09	New	0	±0
Puyalón (PYLN)	66	0.08	New	0	±0
Death to the System (+MAS+)	47	0.06	New	0	±0
Union of Everyone (UdT)	28	0.04	–0.02	0	±0
Blank ballots	823	1.05	+0.11		
Total	78,083			3	±0
Valid votes	78,083	98.31	–0.36		
Invalid votes	1,344	1.69	+0.36		
Votes cast / turnout	79,427	73.73	+4.31		
Abstentions	28,307	26.27	–4.31		
Registered voters	107,734				

=== 2016 ===
Summary of the 26 June 2016 Congress of Deputies election results in Teruel
Parties and alliances	Popular vote			Seats	
Parties and alliances	Votes	%	±pp	Total	+/−
People's Party–Aragonese Party (PP–PAR)	30,913	41.26	+4.86	2	±0
Spanish Socialist Workers' Party (PSOE)	19,724	26.33	+0.67	1	±0
United We Can in Aragon (Podemos–IU–Equo)^{1}	12,558	16.76	–3.57	0	±0
Citizens–Party of the Citizenry (C's)	9,871	13.18	–1.53	0	±0
Animalist Party Against Mistreatment of Animals (PACMA)	402	0.54	+0.06	0	±0
Blank Seats (EB)	245	0.33	–0.07	0	±0
Spanish Phalanx of the CNSO (FE de las JONS)	160	0.21	New	0	±0
Zero Cuts–Green Group (Recortes Cero–GV)	125	0.17	–0.01	0	±0
Communist Party of the Peoples of Spain (PCPE)	71	0.09	–0.03	0	±0
Social Aragonese Movement (MAS)	62	0.08	New	0	±0
Union of Everyone (UdT)	48	0.06	New	0	±0
Independents for Aragon (i)	39	0.05	New	0	±0
Blank ballots	704	0.94	–0.20		
Total	74,922			3	±0
Valid votes	74,922	98.67	+0.04		
Invalid votes	1,010	1.33	–0.04		
Votes cast / turnout	75,932	69.42	–2.21		
Abstentions	33,448	30.58	+2.21		
Registered voters	109,380				
Sources
Footnotes: ^{1} United We Can results are compared to the combined totals of We Can and United Left–Aragonese Union–Popular Unity in Common in the 2015 election.

=== 2015 ===
Summary of the 20 December 2015 Congress of Deputies election results in Teruel
Parties and alliances	Popular vote			Seats	
Parties and alliances	Votes	%	±pp	Total	+/−
People's Party–Aragonese Party (PP–PAR)	28,282	36.40	–15.38	2	±0
Spanish Socialist Workers' Party (PSOE)	19,938	25.66	–7.26	1	±0
We Can (Podemos)	11,895	15.31	New	0	±0
Citizens–Party of the Citizenry (C's)	11,427	14.71	New	0	±0
United Left–Aragonese Union–Popular Unity in Common (IU–CHA–UPeC)	3,897	5.02	–2.88	0	±0
Union, Progress and Democracy (UPyD)	456	0.59	–2.85	0	±0
Animalist Party Against Mistreatment of Animals (PACMA)	375	0.48	+0.14	0	±0
Blank Seats (EB)	313	0.40	–0.20	0	±0
Zero Cuts–Green Group (Recortes Cero–GV)	139	0.18	New	0	±0
Communist Party of the Peoples of Spain (PCPE)	97	0.12	New	0	±0
Blank ballots	883	1.14	–1.05		
Total	77,702			3	±0
Valid votes	77,702	98.63	+0.78		
Invalid votes	1,082	1.37	–0.78		
Votes cast / turnout	78,784	71.63	+1.35		
Abstentions	31,200	28.37	–1.35		
Registered voters	109,984				

=== 2011 ===
Summary of the 20 November 2011 Congress of Deputies election results in Teruel
Parties and alliances	Popular vote			Seats	
Parties and alliances	Votes	%	±pp	Total	+/−
People's Party–Aragonese Party (PP–PAR)^{1}	39,993	51.78	+3.59	2	+1
Spanish Socialist Workers' Party (PSOE)	25,426	32.92	–11.58	1	–1
Aragonese Union–United Left: Plural Left (CHA–IU)^{2}	6,103	7.90	+2.94	0	±0
Union, Progress and Democracy (UPyD)	2,656	3.44	+2.99	0	±0
Blank Seats (EB)	466	0.60	New	0	±0
Animalist Party Against Mistreatment of Animals (PACMA)	260	0.34	+0.23	0	±0
Pirate Party (Pirata)	218	0.28	New	0	±0
Socialists for Teruel (SxT)	169	0.22	New	0	±0
For a Fairer World (PUM+J)	151	0.20	+0.17	0	±0
Communist Unification of Spain (UCE)	93	0.12	New	0	±0
Blank ballots	1,694	2.19	+1.10		
Total	77,229			3	±0
Valid votes	77,229	97.85	–1.39		
Invalid votes	1,700	2.15	+1.39		
Votes cast / turnout	78,929	70.28	–6.29		
Abstentions	33,372	29.72	+6.29		
Registered voters	112,301				
Sources
Footnotes: ^{1} People's Party–Aragonese Party results are compared to the combined totals of the People's Party and Aragonese Party in the 2008 election.; ^{2} Aragonese Union–United Left: Plural Left results are compared to the combined totals of Aragonese Union and United Left in the 2008 election.

=== 2008 ===
Summary of the 9 March 2008 Congress of Deputies election results in Teruel
Parties and alliances	Popular vote			Seats	
Parties and alliances	Votes	%	±pp	Total	+/−
Spanish Socialist Workers' Party (PSOE)	38,617	44.50	+3.41	2	±0
People's Party (PP)	34,386	39.62	–1.21	1	±0
Aragonese Party (PAR)	7,440	8.57	+0.61	0	±0
United Left (IU)	2,270	2.62	–0.24	0	±0
Aragonese Union (CHA)	2,029	2.34	–2.73	0	±0
Union, Progress and Democracy (UPyD)	388	0.45	New	0	±0
The Greens–Green Group (LV–GV)	170	0.20	New	0	±0
Citizens–Party of the Citizenry (C's)	113	0.13	New	0	±0
Anti-Bullfighting Party Against Mistreatment of Animals (PACMA)	93	0.11	New	0	±0
Spanish Phalanx of the CNSO (FE de las JONS)	55	0.06	±0.00	0	±0
Communist Party of the Peoples of Spain (PCPE)	49	0.06	–0.07	0	±0
Aragon United Citizens Party (pCUA)	43	0.05	New	0	±0
National Democracy (DN)	34	0.04	+0.01	0	±0
For a Fairer World (PUM+J)	30	0.03	New	0	±0
Social Democratic Party–Federation of Independents of Aragon (PSD–FIA)	30	0.03	New	0	±0
Spanish Alternative (AES)	21	0.02	New	0	±0
Family and Life Party (PFyV)	18	0.02	–0.03	0	±0
Authentic Phalanx (FA)	17	0.02	New	0	±0
Spain 2000 (E–2000)	16	0.02	New	0	±0
National Alliance (AN)	13	0.01	New	0	±0
Centrist Party (PCTR)	10	0.01	New	0	±0
Blank ballots	944	1.09	–0.44		
Total	86,786			3	±0
Valid votes	86,786	99.24	+0.03		
Invalid votes	667	0.76	–0.03		
Votes cast / turnout	87,453	76.57	+0.21		
Abstentions	26,759	23.43	–0.21		
Registered voters	114,212				

=== 2004 ===
Summary of the 14 March 2004 Congress of Deputies election results in Teruel
Parties and alliances	Popular vote			Seats	
Parties and alliances	Votes	%	±pp	Total	+/−
Spanish Socialist Workers' Party (PSOE)	36,152	41.09	+7.28	2	+1
People's Party (PP)	35,920	40.83	–7.10	1	–1
Aragonese Party (PAR)	7,000	7.96	–1.88	0	±0
Aragonese Union (CHA)	4,463	5.07	+1.71	0	±0
United Left–The Greens (IU–LV)	2,514	2.86	–0.03	0	±0
Communist Party of the Peoples of Spain (PCPE)	110	0.13	New	0	±0
Citizens for Blank Votes (CenB)	99	0.11	New	0	±0
Democratic and Social Centre (CDS)	81	0.09	New	0	±0
Spanish Phalanx of the CNSO (FE de las JONS)	54	0.06	New	0	±0
Republican Left (IR)	53	0.06	New	0	±0
Family and Life Party (PFyV)	47	0.05	New	0	±0
Humanist Party (PH)	40	0.05	–0.01	0	±0
National Democracy (DN)	30	0.03	New	0	±0
The Phalanx (FE)	29	0.03	–0.07	0	±0
Spanish Democratic Party (PADE)	23	0.03	±0.00	0	±0
Republican Social Movement (MSR)	18	0.02	New	0	±0
Blank ballots	1,349	1.53	+0.11		
Total	87,982			3	±0
Valid votes	87,982	99.21	+0.63		
Invalid votes	705	0.79	–0.63		
Votes cast / turnout	88,687	76.36	+4.17		
Abstentions	27,454	23.64	–4.17		
Registered voters	116,141				

=== 2000 ===
Summary of the 12 March 2000 Congress of Deputies election results in Teruel
Parties and alliances	Popular vote			Seats	
Parties and alliances	Votes	%	±pp	Total	+/−
People's Party (PP)	40,383	47.93	–1.30	2	±0
Spanish Socialist Workers' Party–Progressives (PSOE–p)	28,488	33.81	–7.41	1	±0
Aragonese Party (PAR)	8,294	9.84	New	0	±0
Aragonese Union (CHA)	2,831	3.36	+1.52	0	±0
United Left of Aragon (IU)	2,438	2.89	–3.11	0	±0
The Greens–Green Group–SOS Nature (LV–GV)	317	0.38	New	0	±0
The Phalanx (FE)	81	0.10	New	0	±0
Aragonese Initiative (INAR)	65	0.08	New	0	±0
Humanist Party (PH)	51	0.06	New	0	±0
Natural Law Party (PLN)	36	0.04	New	0	±0
Spain 2000 Platform (ES2000)	32	0.04	New	0	±0
Spanish Democratic Party (PADE)	25	0.03	New	0	±0
Catalan State (EC)	18	0.02	New	0	±0
Blank ballots	1,193	1.42	+0.16		
Total	84,252			3	±0
Valid votes	84,252	98.58	–0.87		
Invalid votes	1,211	1.42	+0.87		
Votes cast / turnout	85,463	72.19	–5.30		
Abstentions	32,927	27.81	+5.30		
Registered voters	118,390				

=== 1996 ===
Summary of the 3 March 1996 Congress of Deputies election results in Teruel
Parties and alliances	Popular vote			Seats	
Parties and alliances	Votes	%	±pp	Total	+/−
People's Party–Aragonese Party (PP–PAR)^{1}	45,207	49.23	–2.24	2	+1
Spanish Socialist Workers' Party (PSOE)	37,856	41.22	+0.89	1	–1
United Left of Aragon (IU)	5,506	6.00	+1.57	0	±0
Aragonese Union (CHA)	1,691	1.84	+1.32	0	±0
Centrist Union (UC)	227	0.25	–1.57	0	±0
Workers' Revolutionary Party (PRT)	94	0.10	New	0	±0
Authentic Spanish Phalanx (FEA)	91	0.10	New	0	±0
Blank ballots	1,158	1.26	+0.60		
Total	91,830			3	±0
Valid votes	91,830	99.45	+0.11		
Invalid votes	504	0.55	–0.11		
Votes cast / turnout	92,334	77.49	+1.66		
Abstentions	26,826	22.51	–1.66		
Registered voters	119,160				
Sources
Footnotes: ^{1} People's Party–Aragonese Party results are compared to the combined totals of the People's Party and the Aragonese Party in the 1993 election.

=== 1993 ===
Summary of the 6 June 1993 Congress of Deputies election results in Teruel
Parties and alliances	Popular vote			Seats	
Parties and alliances	Votes	%	±pp	Total	+/−
Spanish Socialist Workers' Party (PSOE)	36,327	40.33	+0.25	2	±0
People's Party (PP)	34,293	38.07	+5.18	1	±0
Aragonese Party (PAR)	12,070	13.40	+2.84	0	±0
United Left of Aragon (IU)	3,990	4.43	+0.18	0	±0
Democratic and Social Centre (CDS)	1,644	1.82	–6.87	0	±0
Aragonese Union (CHA)	465	0.52	+0.28	0	±0
The Ecologists (LE)	200	0.22	–0.21	0	±0
The Greens (LV)^{1}	193	0.21	–0.14	0	±0
Ruiz-Mateos Group–Independent Party–Social Movement (ARM–PAI–MAS)	86	0.10	–0.49	0	±0
Humanist Party (PH)	63	0.07	–0.02	0	±0
Revolutionary Workers' Party (POR)	56	0.06	New	0	±0
Coalition for a New Socialist Party (CNPS)	54	0.06	New	0	±0
Natural Law Party (PLN)	46	0.05	New	0	±0
Communist Unification of Spain (UCE)	0	0.00	New	0	±0
Blank ballots	597	0.66	–0.03		
Total	90,084			3	±0
Valid votes	90,084	99.34	+0.20		
Invalid votes	594	0.66	–0.20		
Votes cast / turnout	90,678	75.83	+4.90		
Abstentions	28,900	24.17	–4.90		
Registered voters	119,578				
Sources
Footnotes: ^{1} The Greens results are compared to The Greens–Green List totals in the 1989 election.

=== 1989 ===
Summary of the 29 October 1989 Congress of Deputies election results in Teruel
Parties and alliances	Popular vote			Seats	
Parties and alliances	Votes	%	±pp	Total	+/−
Spanish Socialist Workers' Party (PSOE)	33,744	40.08	–1.00	2	±0
People's Party (PP)^{1}	27,695	32.89	+0.08	1	±0
Regionalist Aragonese Party (PAR)	8,894	10.56	+0.91	0	±0
Democratic and Social Centre (CDS)	7,319	8.69	–1.91	0	±0
United Left (IU)	3,580	4.25	+2.69	0	±0
Ruiz-Mateos Group (Ruiz-Mateos)	497	0.59	New	0	±0
Workers' Socialist Party (PST)	410	0.49	–0.01	0	±0
The Ecologist Greens (LVE)	365	0.43	New	0	±0
Workers' Party of Spain–Communist Unity (PTE–UC)^{2}	354	0.42	–0.57	0	±0
The Greens–Green List (LV–LV)	291	0.35	New	0	±0
Aragonese Union (UA–CHA)	203	0.24	New	0	±0
Spanish Phalanx of the CNSO (FE–JONS)	97	0.12	–0.24	0	±0
Communist Party of the Peoples of Spain (PCPE)	88	0.10	New	0	±0
Humanist Party (PH)	74	0.09	New	0	±0
Blank ballots	585	0.69	–0.18		
Total	84,196			3	±0
Valid votes	84,196	99.14	+0.70		
Invalid votes	731	0.86	–0.70		
Votes cast / turnout	84,927	70.93	+0.53		
Abstentions	34,799	29.07	–0.53		
Registered voters	119,726				
Sources
Footnotes: ^{1} People's Party results are compared to People's Coalition totals in the 1986 election.; ^{2} Workers' Party of Spain–Communist Unity results are compared to Communists' Unity Board totals in the 1986 election.

=== 1986 ===
Summary of the 22 June 1986 Congress of Deputies election results in Teruel
Parties and alliances	Popular vote			Seats	
Parties and alliances	Votes	%	±pp	Total	+/−
Spanish Socialist Workers' Party (PSOE)	35,785	41.08	+0.11	2	±0
People's Coalition (AP–PDP–PL)^{1}	28,583	32.81	–0.72	1	±0
Democratic and Social Centre (CDS)	9,233	10.60	+5.88	0	±0
Regionalist Aragonese Party (PAR)	8,405	9.65	New	0	±0
United Left (IU)^{2}	1,363	1.56	+0.37	0	±0
Democratic Reformist Party (PRD)	956	1.11	New	0	±0
Communists' Unity Board (MUC)	860	0.99	New	0	±0
Workers' Socialist Party (PST)	434	0.50	+0.08	0	±0
Spanish Phalanx of the CNSO (FE–JONS)	312	0.36	New	0	±0
Republican Popular Unity (UPR)^{3}	224	0.26	+0.13	0	±0
Communist Unification of Spain (UCE)	205	0.24	+0.08	0	±0
Blank ballots	754	0.87	+0.21		
Total	87,114			3	±0
Valid votes	87,114	98.44	+0.27		
Invalid votes	1,378	1.56	–0.27		
Votes cast / turnout	88,492	70.40	–9.65		
Abstentions	37,209	29.60	+9.65		
Registered voters	125,701				
Sources
Footnotes: ^{1} People's Coalition results are compared to People's Alliance–People's Democratic–Aragonese Party totals in the 1982 election.; ^{2} United Left results are compared to Communist Party of Aragon totals in the 1982 election.; ^{3} Republican Popular Unity results are compared to Communist Party of Spain (Marxist–Leninist) totals in the 1982 election.

=== 1982 ===
Summary of the 28 October 1982 Congress of Deputies election results in Teruel
Parties and alliances	Popular vote			Seats	
Parties and alliances	Votes	%	±pp	Total	+/−
Spanish Socialist Workers' Party (PSOE)	38,834	40.97	+13.84	2	+1
People's Alliance–People's Democratic–Aragonese Party (AP–PDP–PAR)^{1}	31,779	33.53	+25.27	1	+1
Union of the Democratic Centre (UCD)	15,570	16.43	–39.02	0	–2
Democratic and Social Centre (CDS)	4,472	4.72	New	0	±0
Communist Party of Aragon (PCA–PCE)	1,124	1.19	–2.05	0	±0
New Force (FN)^{2}	975	1.03	–1.34	0	±0
Socialist Party of Aragon (PSAr)^{3}	626	0.66	–0.07	0	±0
Workers' Socialist Party (PST)	399	0.42	New	0	±0
Communist Unification of Spain (UCE)	148	0.16	New	0	±0
Communist Party of Spain (Marxist–Leninist) (PCE (m–l))	125	0.13	New	0	±0
Falangist Movement of Spain (MFE)	99	0.10	New	0	±0
Communist Left (LCR–MC)^{4}	0	0.00	–0.44	0	±0
Blank ballots	627	0.66	+0.13		
Total	94,778			3	±0
Valid votes	94,778	98.17	–0.72		
Invalid votes	1,767	1.83	+0.72		
Votes cast / turnout	96,545	80.05	+10.39		
Abstentions	24,055	19.95	–10.39		
Registered voters	120,600				
Sources
Footnotes: ^{1} People's Alliance–People's Democratic–Aragonese Party results are compared to Democratic Coalition totals in the 1979 election.; ^{2} New Force results are compared to National Union totals in the 1979 election.; ^{3} Socialist Party of Aragon results are compared to Coalition for Aragon totals in the 1979 election.; ^{4} Communist Left results are compared to the combined totals of Communist Movement–Organization of Communist Left and Revolutionary Communist League in the 1979 election.

=== 1979 ===
Summary of the 1 March 1979 Congress of Deputies election results in Teruel
Parties and alliances	Popular vote			Seats	
Parties and alliances	Votes	%	±pp	Total	+/−
Union of the Democratic Centre (UCD)	46,775	55.45	+5.25	2	±0
Spanish Socialist Workers' Party (PSOE)^{1}	22,886	27.13	+5.89	1	±0
Democratic Coalition (CD)^{2}	6,971	8.26	–8.01	0	±0
Communist Party of Spain (PCE)	2,737	3.24	+0.62	0	±0
National Union (UN)^{3}	2,000	2.37	+2.01	0	±0
Coalition for Aragon (PSAr–PSDA)	615	0.73	New	0	±0
Party of Labour of Spain (PTE)	475	0.56	New	0	±0
Workers' Communist Party (PCT)	322	0.38	New	0	±0
Communist Movement–Organization of Communist Left (MC–OIC)	247	0.29	New	0	±0
Republican Left (IR)	246	0.29	New	0	±0
Carlist Party (PC)	197	0.23	New	0	±0
Communist Organization of Spain (Red Flag) (OCE–BR)	152	0.18	New	0	±0
Workers' Revolutionary Organization (ORT)	151	0.18	+0.18	0	±0
Revolutionary Communist League (LCR)	128	0.15	New	0	±0
Blank ballots	448	0.53	+0.02		
Total	84,350			3	±0
Valid votes	84,350	98.89	+0.77		
Invalid votes	945	1.11	–0.77		
Votes cast / turnout	85,295	69.66	–14.93		
Abstentions	37,146	30.34	+14.93		
Registered voters	122,441				
Sources
Footnotes: ^{1} Spanish Socialist Workers' Party results are compared to the combined totals of Spanish Socialist Workers' Party and People's Socialist Party–Socialist Unity in the 1977 election.; ^{2} Democratic Coalition results are compared to People's Alliance totals in the 1977 election.; ^{3} National Union results are compared to National Alliance July 18 totals in the 1977 election.

=== 1977 ===
Summary of the 15 June 1977 Congress of Deputies election results in Teruel
Parties and alliances	Popular vote			Seats	
Parties and alliances	Votes	%	±pp	Total	+/−
Union of the Democratic Centre (UCD)	46,820	50.20	n/a	2	n/a
Spanish Socialist Workers' Party (PSOE)	16,423	17.61	n/a	1	n/a
People's Alliance (AP)	15,180	16.27	n/a	0	n/a
Independent (INDEP)	6,158	6.60	n/a	0	n/a
People's Socialist Party–Socialist Unity (PSP–US)	3,387	3.63	n/a	0	n/a
Communist Party of Spain (PCE)	2,442	2.62	n/a	0	n/a
Spanish Social Reform (RSE)	1,842	1.97	n/a	0	n/a
National Alliance July 18 (AN18)	332	0.36	n/a	0	n/a
Independent Liberal Party (PLI)	209	0.22	n/a	0	n/a
Blank ballots	479	0.51	n/a		
Total	93,272			3	n/a
Valid votes	93,272	98.12	n/a		
Invalid votes	1,783	1.88	n/a		
Votes cast / turnout	95,055	84.59	n/a		
Abstentions	17,321	15.41	n/a		
Registered voters	112,376				

== Bibliography ==
- Ley 1/1977, de 4 de enero, para la Reforma Política (Fundamental Law 1/1977). Official State Gazette (in Spanish). 4 January 1977. BOE-A-1977-165.
- Real Decreto-ley 20/1977, de 18 de marzo, sobre Normas Electorales (Royal Decree-Law 20/1977). Official State Gazette (in Spanish). 18 March 1977. BOE-A-1977-7445.
- Constitución Española (Constitution). Official State Gazette (in Spanish). 27 December 1978. BOE-A-1978-31229.
- Ley Orgánica 5/1985, de 19 de junio, del Régimen Electoral General (Organic Law 5/1985). Official State Gazette (in Spanish). 19 June 1985. BOE-A-1985-11672.
- Carreras de Odriozola, Albert; Tafunell Sambola, Xavier (2005) [1989]. Estadísticas históricas de España, siglos XIX-XX (PDF) (in Spanish). Vol. 1 (II ed.). Bilbao: Fundación BBVA. pp. 1072–1097. ISBN 84-96515-00-1. Archived from the original (PDF) on 24 September 2015.
