= Marta Abengochea =

Spanish politician

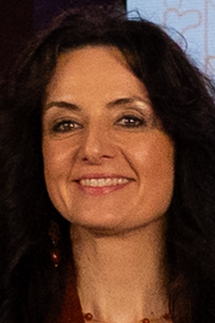

Marta Abengochea Aurensanz (born 1976) is a Spanish politician of the United Left (IU). She was elected leader of the United Left of Aragon in 2025 and was elected to the Cortes of Aragon in the 2026 election.

== Biography ==
Abengochea was born in San Sebastián in the Basque Country, but only lived there to the age of one, and considers herself Aragonese. She worked for the city council in Teruel before becoming a civil servant for the same entity in Zaragoza in 2001, working in areas including policing and taxation.

Abengochea was a delegate to the General Confederation of Labour (CGT) before pursuing politics in 2015. From 2015 to 2023, she was the councillor in charge of equality, childhood and youth, as well as the deputy mayor of Zuera in the Province of Zaragoza. For the first four years of that period, she was also a member of the Provincial Deputation of Zaragoza.

In October 2025, Abengochea presented a candidacy to succeed Álvaro Sanz as leader of the United Left of Aragon. At the end of November, at the party's 14th assembly, she was confirmed as leader, having run unopposed. Ahead of the snap 2026 Aragonese regional election, she was confirmed as the lead candidate for a joint United Left–Sumar list; she lamented that Podemos did not join it. Abengochea's manifesto sought to "halt the reactionary advance" and bring about "more [human] rights and less of the right [wing]". The IU–MS list retained the one seat that had belonged to Sanz for Abengochea to occupy, while Podemos won no seats.
