= Tomás Guitarte =

Spanish architect and politician

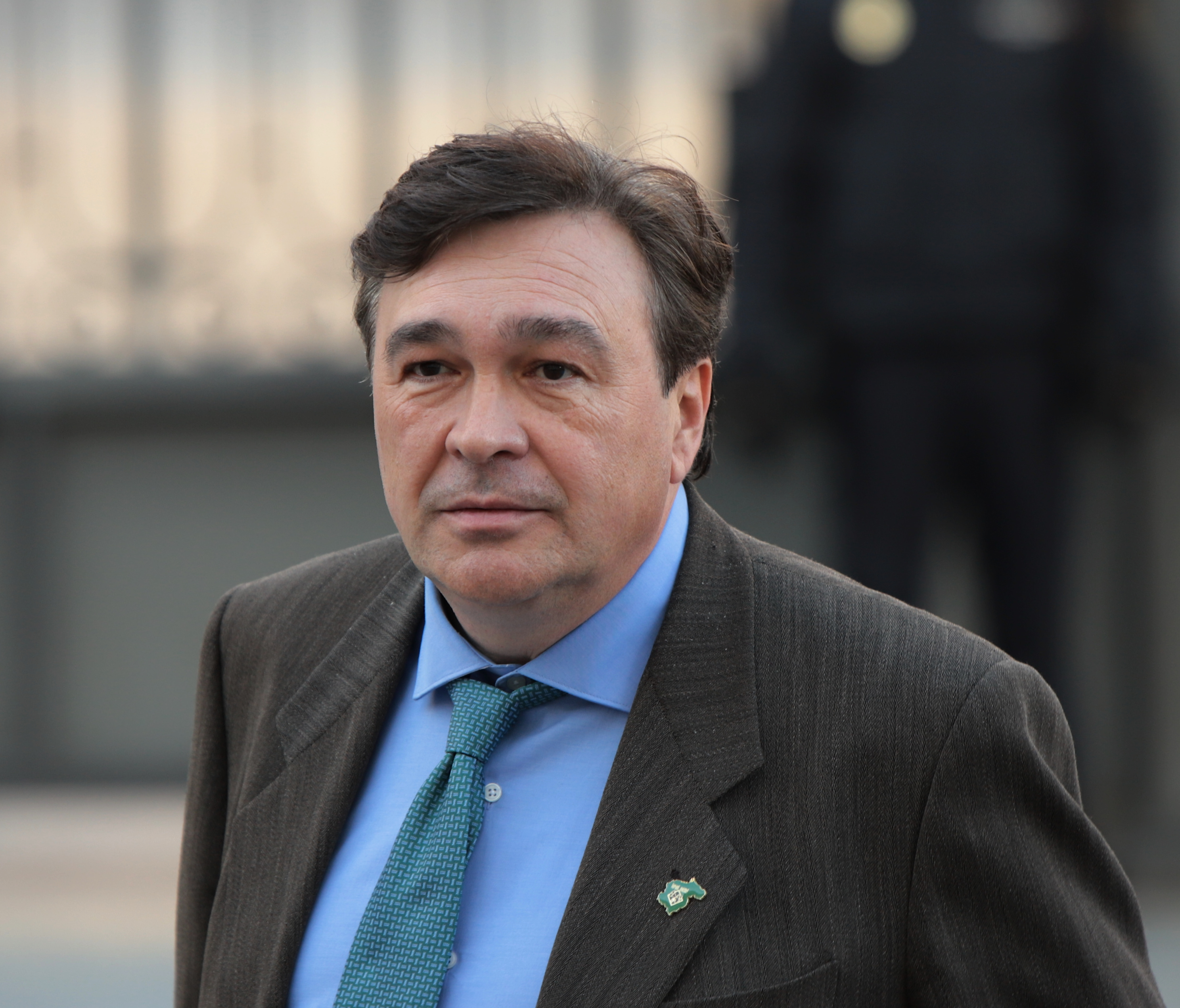

Member of the Cortes of Aragon
- Incumbent
- Assumed office 23 June 2023
- Constituency: Teruel

Member of the Congress of Deputies
- In office 3 December 2019 – 30 May 2023
- Constituency: Teruel

Personal details
- Born: Tomás José Guitarte Gimeno; 1961 (age 64–65) Cutanda, Teruel, Spain
- Party: Teruel Existe
- Other political affiliations: Chunta Aragonesista (formerly)
- Education: Technical University of Valencia

Tomás José Guitarte Gimeno is a Spanish architect and politician serving as the president of Teruel Existe. He was deputy of the Congress of Deputies for Teruel Existe during the 14th Cortes Generales. Since 2023 he is a member of the Cortes of Aragon.

Guitarte faced harassment from right-wing and far-right supporters. This stemmed from his decision to vote in favour of the investiture of the PSOE and Unidas Podemos coalition. As a result, Guitarte has been provided with a security escort by the Ministry of the Interior.

Since November 2022 Guitarte has been spokesperson for the Empty Spain coalition, of which Teruel Existe is a part.
