= Manuel Blasco Marqués =

Spanish politician (born 1960)

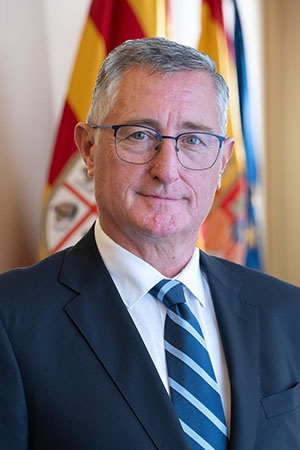

Manuel Blasco Marqués (born 9 February 1960) is a Spanish politician of the People's Party (PP). He was a councillor in Teruel from 1987 to 2016, and the city's mayor from 1999 to 2003 and again from 2010 to 2016. He was a member of the Senate of Spain from 2004 to 2023, excluding the period 2016 to 2019 in which he sat in the Congress of Deputies. In 2023, he was named Minister of Environment and Tourism in the Government of Aragon.

== Biography ==
Born in Teruel in Aragon, Blasco is married and has two children as of 2015. He studied for a law degree, but did not complete it. In 1982 he joined the People's Alliance (AP) which became the People's Party (PP) in 1989. He was elected to his hometown's city council in 1987 and became mayor in 1999, serving until 2003.

Blasco was president of the PP in Teruel between 2000 and 2008. He was elected to the Senate of Spain in 2004. In November 2010, he was elected mayor of Teruel again, as the leader of the most voted list of the 2007 election, following the collapse of the previous Spanish Socialist Workers' Party (PSOE) and Aragonese Party (PAR) government. Six months later, elections were held, and his party won the first ever absolute majority in Teruel with 12 out of 21 seats.

In 2015, Blasco was re-elected as mayor with the votes of his eight councillors, while each other party voted their own candidate except for Citizens which abstained. He resigned at the start of February 2016 due to his new seat in the Congress of Deputies, and was succeeded by Emma Buj.

Blasco returned to the Senate in April 2019. He was re-elected in 2023, but was not sworn in, as he was named Minister of Environment and Tourism in the Government of Aragon.
