= Jorge Pueyo =

Spanish lawyer, politician and television presenter

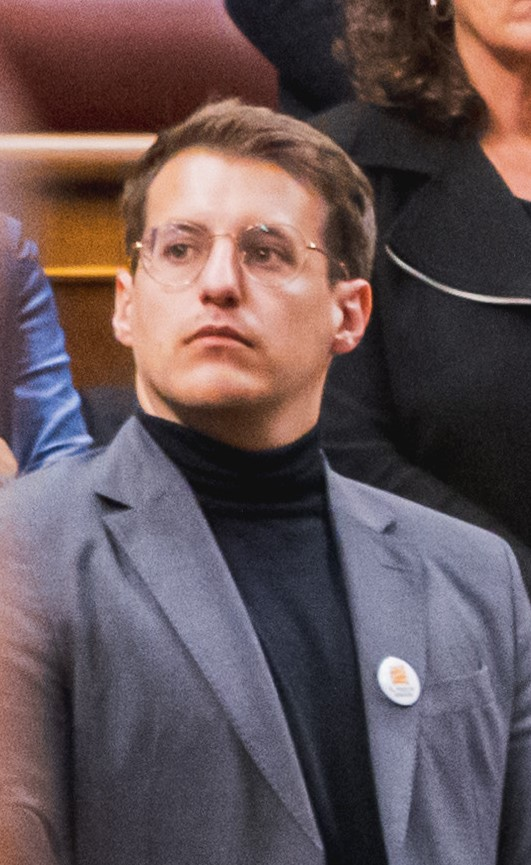

Member of the Congress of Deputies
- In office 17 August 2023 – 30 January 2026
- Succeeded by: Laura Vergara

Deputy Spokesman of the Plurinational Parliamentary Group Sumar in the Congress of Deputies
- In office 28 August 2023 – 1 January 2024

Personal details
- Born: Jorge Pueyo Sanz; 31 October 1995 (age 30) Fonz, Huesca, Spain
- Party: Chunta Aragonesista
- Occupation: Politician, lawyer, television presenter

Jorge Pueyo Sanz (born 31 October 1995) is a Spanish lawyer, politician, television presenter. He has collaborated in Charrín Charrán and currently presents A escampar la boira. From 2023 to 2026, he was a deputy in the XV Legislature for Sumar.

== Biography ==
Jorge Pueyo was born in Fonz, an Aragonese-speaking town. During his childhood he experienced situations of linguistic inequality, where his teachers belittled the Aragonese language. These facts made him interested in the dissemination of Aragonese.

He has made several poems in Aragonese, in 2018 he won together with Celia Naval the second prize "Condau de Ribagorza" in the category of short stories for his poem "Tierra muixada".

His project for the dissemination of Aragonese began with a YouTube channel, a kind of program in Aragonese that did not succeed. On 5 May 2019, the program Charrín Charrán premiered, the first program in Aragonese on television, presented by Silvia Cebolla, where he participated as editor and reporter. Although his leap to fame came when in October 2021 he began to publish a morning newscast from Monday to Thursday in Aragonese on Twitter, by being published on social networks his content could reach many more people, his first video reached 30 000 views and was shared by Ángel Martín.

On 25 May 2022 the program A escampar la boira, a midnight program for Aragón TV, was premiered, where relevant personalities inside and outside Aragon are interviewed in Aragonese.

On 12 June 2023 he announced on his Twitter and Instagram accounts that he would be the number one candidate on the list of the Chunta Aragonesista and Sumar for Zaragoza in the general elections of July 23. Pueyo would become a deputy in the XV Legislature and was appointed deputy spokesperson for Sumar. From the beginning, he committed to use the Aragonese language in his plenary speeches.
