= Teruel Existe =

Regionalist political party in Spain

Teruel Exists Teruel Existe
- Spokesperson: Tomás Guitarte
- Founded: November 1999 (platform); 29 September 2021 (party)
- Headquarters: Avda. Sagunto, nº 3, 1ºA; 44002, Teruel
- Ideology: Regionalism
- Political position: Big tent
- National affiliation: Empty Spain
- Regional affiliation: Existe Coalition (since 2022)
- Colors: Green
- Congress of Deputies (Teruel seats): 0 / 3
- Senate of Spain (Teruel seats): 0 / 4
- Cortes of Aragon (Teruel seats): 2 / 14
- Local government in Teruel: 111 / 1,139

Website
- teruelexiste.info

Teruel Existe (English: Teruel Exists, TE) is a Spanish political party based in the province of Teruel. It was founded in November 1999 as a citizen platform with the goal of demanding a fair and equal treatment for the province. It has since extended to the whole of Aragon under the Aragón Existe brand (English: Aragon Exists, AE).

In 1999, Teruel still had no motorways, and on the only railway line (which was single-track without electrification) the train had derailed eight times in a year. Encouraged by the success of the strike called for 4 October 2019 in twenty Spanish provinces, to protest the "forgetfulness" suffered by the so-called "empty Spain", the platform chose to establish itself as a grouping of electors to contest the November 2019 Spanish general election in the province. It became the most voted force in the province, securing one out of the three seats in the Congress of Deputies in the Teruel constituency, and two out of its four directly-elected senators, as well as becoming the first grouping of electors since the Spanish transition to democracy to be successful in entering the Spanish parliament.

The platform was instrumental in the investiture of Pedro Sánchez as Prime Minister of Spain on 5–7 January 2020, for whose support its leader Tomás Guitarte received intense threats and coercion from right-wing and far-right groups, which resulted in the Ministry of the Interior having to provide him with a police escort for security reasons. The platform was registered as a political party on 29 September 2021.

== Electoral performance ==
=== Cortes Generales ===
Cortes Generales
Election	Leading candidate	Congress				Senate		Government
Election	Leading candidate	Votes	%	Seats	+/–	Seats	+/–	Government
Nov. 2019	Tomás Guitarte	19,761	0.08 (19th)	1 / 350	1	2 / 208	2	Opposition
2023	Diego Loras	Within Empty Spain (Note: 11,348 votes as Teruel Existe)		0 / 350	1	0 / 208	2	Extra-parliamentary

=== Cortes of Aragon ===
Cortes of Aragon
Election	Leading candidate	Votes (Note: Total votes for the Existe Coalition)	%	Seats	+/–	Government
2023	Tomás Guitarte	33,190 (Note: 15,338 votes as Teruel Existe)	5.0 (5th)	3 / 67	3	Opposition
2026	Tomás Guitarte	23,320 (Note: 8,693 votes as Teruel Existe)	3.6 (5th)	2 / 67	1	Opposition
