= Nationwide opinion polling for the 2023 Spanish general election (2019–2021) =

In the run up to the 2023 Spanish general election, various organisations carried out opinion polling to gauge voting intention in Spain during the term of the 14th Cortes Generales. Results of such polls are displayed in this article. The date range for these opinion polls is from the previous general election, held on 10 November 2019, to the day the next election will be held, on 29 November 2026. This article displays polls conducted between 2023 and 2024.

Voting intention estimates refer mainly to a hypothetical Congress of Deputies election. Polls are listed in reverse chronological order, showing the most recent first and using the dates when the survey fieldwork was done, as opposed to the date of publication. Where the fieldwork dates are unknown, the date of publication is given instead. The highest percentage figure in each polling survey is displayed with its background shaded in the leading party's colour. If a tie ensues, this is applied to the figures with the highest percentages. The "Lead" columns on the right shows the percentage-point difference between the parties with the highest percentages in a poll.

The tables below list nationwide voting intention estimates. Refusals are generally excluded from the party vote percentages, while question wording and the treatment of "don't know" responses and those not intending to vote may vary between polling organisations. When available, seat projections determined by the polling organisations are displayed below (or in place of) the percentages in a smaller font; 176 seats are required for an absolute majority in the Congress of Deputies.

== Polling ==
=== 2021 ===
Polling firm/Commissioner	Fieldwork date	Sample size	Turnout	PSOE	PP	Vox	Unidas Podemos	Cs	ERC–Sobiranistes	Más País	Junts	PNV	EH Bildu	CUP	CC–NCa	BNG	NA+	PRC	TE	Lead
EM-Analytics/Electomanía	24–30 Dec	1,189	?	24.9; 95	23.9; 98	19.9; 75	11.8; 29	3.2; 1	3.5; 14	2.7; 6	2.4; 9	1.5; 6	1.3; 6	1.0; 2	0.7; 2	0.9; 2	0.5; 2	0.2; 1	0.1; 1	1.0
40dB/Prisa	23–30 Dec	2,000	?	26.1; 102/114	23.5; 95/102	18.3; 63/71	11.8; 28/34	3.6; 2/3	? 13	3.6; 3/4	? 8	? 6	? 4	? 2	? 2	–	? 2	? 1	? 1	2.6
IMOP/El Confidencial	20–30 Dec	1,315	?	25.2; 102	25.0; 102	18.6; 67	12.1; 30	2.8; 1	3.2; 13	2.7; 3	1.8; 7	1.6; 7	1.3; 5	1.3; 4	0.4; 1	1.1; 4	0.4; 2	0.2; 1	0.1; 1	0.2
SocioMétrica/El Español	20–30 Dec	3,000	?	25.5; 103	24.2; 101	17.7; 65	12.3; 33	4.3; 3	2.8; 12	3.2; 5	2.0; 8	1.4; 6	1.0; 4	1.0; 2	0.6; 2	0.7; 2	0.4; 2	0.2; 1	0.1; 1	1.3
PSOE	27 Dec	?	?	29.0	22.0	17.0	11.0	–	–	–	–	–	–	–	–	–	–	–	–	7.0
Sigma Dos/Antena 3	26 Dec	?	?	25.7; 102	28.8; 125	15.7; 52	10.6; 25	3.2; 1	3.0 ?	3.0; 6	1.0 ?	1.9 ?	–	–	–	–	–	–	–	3.1
Sigma Dos/El Mundo	20–24 Dec	2,619	?	26.0; 102	27.4; 118	16.6; 58	10.9; 25	3.1; 1	3.0; 12	3.1; 6	2.0; 8	1.9; 8	–	–	–	–	–	–	–	1.4
EM-Analytics/Electomanía	17–23 Dec	1,299	?	25.3; 101	24.6; 99	19.5; 70	11.4; 28	3.2; 1	3.5; 14	2.7; 6	2.4; 9	1.5; 6	1.3; 5	1.0; 2	0.6; 2	0.9; 2	0.5; 2	0.2; 1	0.1; 1	0.7
KeyData/Público	22 Dec	?	67.1	25.7; 103	26.4; 113	17.1; 59	11.1; 29	3.1; 1	3.4; 13	3.1; 4	2.1; 8	1.6; 6	1.1; 5	0.9; 2	0.5; 2	? 1	? 2	? 1	? 1	0.7
DYM/Henneo	15–19 Dec	1,012	?	25.6; 101/106	27.6; 119/124	16.9; 54/58	10.6; 23/26	4.7; 2/3	–	3.2; 2/3	–	–	–	–	–	–	–	–	–	2.0
Celeste-Tel/Onda Cero	13–17 Dec	1,100	?	26.0; 102	27.9; 118	16.1; 55	10.2; 25	3.4; 2	3.2; 13	3.9; 5	2.4; 9	1.5; 6	1.2; 5	0.9; 2	0.6; 2	0.7; 2	0.4; 2	0.2; 1	0.1; 1	1.9
IMOP/El Confidencial	6–17 Dec	1,297	?	25.7; 103	24.7; 101	19.1; 68	11.8; 30	2.4; 1	3.2; 13	2.5; 3	1.8; 8	1.6; 7	1.2; 5	1.2; 3	0.5; 2	1.0; 2	0.4; 2	0.2; 1	0.1; 1	1.0
GAD3/ABC	13–16 Dec	1,003	68	25.1; 99	28.5; 122	17.1; 56	9.8; 24	2.5; 1	3.3; 15	2.5; 3	2.1; 8	1.6; 7	1.3; 5	0.8; 2	0.6; 2	0.8; 2	0.4; 2	0.2; 1	0.1; 1	3.4
EM-Analytics/Electomanía	10–16 Dec	1,305	?	25.3; 102	25.3; 101	18.7; 69	11.1; 26	3.2; 1	3.5; 13	2.8; 6	2.4; 10	1.5; 6	1.3; 5	1.0; 2	0.6; 2	0.9; 2	0.5; 2	0.2; 1	0.1; 1	Tie
CIS (SocioMétrica) (Note: Alternative projection based on raw CIS data.)	1–13 Dec	3,733	63.9	24.7	20.7	18.8	14.1	4.6	2.6	2.7	1.7	1.2	0.8	1.0	0.2	0.5	0.3	0.1	0.0	4.0
CIS	1–13 Dec	3,733	?	28.0	20.8	14.6	13.7	5.9	2.5	2.2	1.4	1.2	0.8	0.8	0.3	0.6	0.4	0.2	0.1	7.2
Simple Lógica	1–13 Dec	1,041	65.3	25.5	23.1	19.4	10.6	3.6	–	2.8	–	–	–	–	–	–	–	–	–	2.4
NC Report/La Razón	8–11 Dec	1,000	62.2	25.3; 97/99	28.8; 123/125	15.5; 51/53	9.9; 24/26	3.0; 1	3.4; 13/14	3.5; 6/7	2.2; 8	1.7; 7	1.0; 5	–	–	–	0.4; 2	–	–	3.5
EM-Analytics/Electomanía	3–10 Dec	2,177	?	25.5; 102	25.7; 105	18.5; 67	10.8; 25	3.3; 1	3.5; 13	2.7; 6	2.4; 10	1.5; 6	1.3; 5	1.0; 2	0.6; 2	0.9; 2	0.5; 2	0.2; 1	0.1; 1	0.2
Data10/Okdiario	7–9 Dec	1,000	?	25.6; 100	28.1; 119	16.5; 56	10.6; 26	2.8; 1	3.2; 13	3.4; 5	2.1; 9	1.6; 7	1.1; 5	0.9; 2	0.4; 1	0.7; 2	0.4; 2	0.2; 1	0.1; 1	2.5
Hamalgama Métrica/Vozpópuli	2–9 Dec	1,000	?	25.7; 99	28.1; 118	16.3; 57	10.2; 26	2.9; 1	3.3; 13	3.3; 6	2.3; 9	1.5; 6	1.1; 5	0.9; 2	0.5; 2	0.7; 2	0.4; 2	0.2; 1	0.1; 1	2.4
Ágora Integral/Canarias Ahora	1–5 Dec	1,500	62.5	25.5; 101	24.5; 102	16.9; 58	11.8; 32	3.2; 2	3.7; 13	4.4; 7	2.1; 8	1.6; 7	1.2; 5	1.0; 2	0.4; 1	0.5; 1	? 2	0.3; 1	0.9 (Note: Results for Empty Spain.); 8	1.0
EM-Analytics/Electomanía	26 Nov–3 Dec	1,132	?	25.8; 102	25.8; 105	18.1; 66	11.1; 26	3.3; 1	3.4; 13	2.8; 6	2.4; 10	1.5; 6	1.3; 5	1.0; 2	0.6; 2	0.9; 2	0.4; 2	0.2; 1	0.1; 1	Tie
IMOP/El Confidencial	22 Nov–3 Dec	1,316	?	25.7; 104	25.8; 105	18.2; 64	11.6; 28	2.3; 1	2.9; 13	2.7; 3	2.1; 8	1.7; 7	1.2; 5	1.1; 3	0.4; 1	1.1; 4	0.4; 2	0.2; 1	0.1; 1	0.1
Sigma Dos/El Mundo	30 Nov–1 Dec	1,633	?	26.4; 106	28.6; 126	15.0; 47	10.1; 24	3.5; 1	3.0; 12	3.5; 7	2.0; 7	1.9; 8	–	–	–	–	–	–	–	2.2
EM-Analytics/Electomanía	19–26 Nov	?	?	25.9; 104	26.2; 109	17.9; 62	10.9; 25	3.2; 1	3.4; 13	2.8; 6	2.4; 10	1.5; 6	1.2; 5	0.9; 2	0.5; 1	0.8; 2	0.4; 2	0.2; 1	0.1; 1	0.3
SW Demoscopia/Publicaciones Sur	23–24 Nov	610	?	25.9; 106	23.0; 97	18.8; 68	12.7; 33	3.0; 1	? 13	2.5; 3	? 8	? 6	? 5	–	–	–	–	–	–	2.9
KeyData/Público	22 Nov	?	65.9	25.6; 102	27.3; 116	16.4; 56	11.1; 29	2.8; 1	3.6; 13	3.1; 5	2.1; 8	1.5; 6	1.1; 5	0.9; 2	0.5; 2	? 1	? 2	? 1	? 1	1.7
Sigma Dos/Antena 3	22 Nov	?	?	25.8; 101	29.3; 130	15.2; 47	11.0; 26	3.4; 1	3.0; 12	2.9; 6	2.0; 8	1.9; 8	–	–	–	–	–	–	–	3.5
DYM/Henneo	17–21 Nov	1,021	?	25.5; 100/105	25.8; 106/111	18.3; 62/66	12.2; 29/32	4.7; 2/3	–	2.5; 2/3	–	–	–	–	–	–	–	–	–	0.3
InvyMark/laSexta	15–19 Nov	?	?	26.7	28.0	16.6	9.4	1.3	–	4.0	–	–	–	–	–	–	–	–	–	1.3
EM-Analytics/Electomanía	12–19 Nov	1,564	?	25.7; 101	25.7; 105	18.2; 67	11.5; 26	3.0; 1	3.5; 13	2.8; 6	2.4; 10	1.5; 6	1.2; 5	0.9; 2	0.5; 1	0.8; 2	0.4; 2	0.3; 1	0.1; 1	Tie
IMOP/El Confidencial	8–19 Nov	1,343	?	27.1; 107	26.8; 113	16.7; 57	11.0; 27	2.2; 0	3.0; 13	3.0; 4	2.2; 8	1.6; 6	1.0; 4	1.0; 3	0.4; 1	1.1; 3	0.4; 2	0.2; 1	0.1; 1	0.3
Celeste-Tel/Onda Cero	11–16 Nov	1,100	63.4	26.1; 102	28.5; 121	15.4; 52	10.5; 26	3.4; 2	3.1; 13	4.0; 5	2.2; 8	1.6; 6	1.1; 5	0.9; 2	0.5; 2	0.7; 2	0.4; 2	0.2; 1	0.1; 1	2.4
Simple Lógica	30 Oct–15 Nov	1,026	62.9	24.3	23.0	18.3	11.4	2.8	–	3.8	–	–	–	–	–	–	–	–	–	1.3
Sigma Dos/El Mundo	10–11 Nov	1,688	?	25.9; 100	29.1; 130	15.4; 48	10.5; 24	3.0; 1	3.0; 12	3.6; 7	2.0; 8	1.8; 8	–	–	–	–	–	–	–	3.2
GAD3/NIUS	8–11 Nov	1,001	66	24.9; 96/100	29.5; 124/128	14.7; 47/49	11.8; 32/34	2.5; 1	3.3; 13/14	2.8; 3	1.9; 7/8	1.6; 7	1.0; 4	0.8; 2	0.6; 2	0.7; 1	0.4; 2	0.2; 1	0.1; 1	4.6
EM-Analytics/Electomanía	4–11 Nov	1,502	?	25.8; 104	26.2; 107	17.9; 61	11.5; 28	3.0; 1	3.4; 14	2.8; 6	2.3; 9	1.5; 6	1.2; 5	0.9; 2	0.5; 1	0.8; 2	0.4; 2	0.3; 1	0.1; 1	0.4
CIS	2–11 Nov	3,779	?	27.6	20.9	14.3	13.6	5.7	2.6	3.1	1.5	1.4	0.8	1.0	0.4	0.6	0.4	0.1	0.1	6.7
Hamalgama Métrica/Vozpópuli	3–10 Nov	1,000	?	25.8; 100	28.3; 120	16.1; 55	10.3; 26	2.8; 1	3.3; 13	3.4; 6	2.3; 9	1.5; 6	1.1; 5	0.9; 2	0.5; 2	0.6; 1	0.4; 2	0.2; 1	0.1; 1	2.5
SocioMétrica/El Español	5–8 Nov	1,200	?	25.4; 105	25.5; 107	16.8; 58	12.4; 34	3.9; 2	3.2; 13	3.3; 5	1.8; 7	1.4; 6	1.0; 4	0.9; 2	0.6; 2	0.6; 1	0.4; 2	0.2; 1	0.1; 1	0.1
NC Report/La Razón	2–6 Nov	1,000	62.6	25.2; 98/100	29.3; 125/127	15.2; 49/51	9.8; 24/26	2.9; 1	3.4; 13	3.0; 6	2.2; 8	1.7; 7	1.0; 5	–	–	–	0.4; 2	–	–	4.1
IMOP/El Confidencial	25 Oct–6 Nov	1,342	?	26.3; 104	27.1; 117	16.4; 51	11.5; 30	2.4; 1	3.1; 13	3.1; 4	2.0; 8	1.7; 7	1.1; 5	1.1; 3	0.4; 1	1.0; 2	0.5; 2	0.2; 1	0.1; 1	0.8
InvyMark/laSexta	1–5 Nov	?	?	26.0	28.2	16.9	8.7	1.5	–	4.5	–	–	–	–	–	–	–	–	–	2.2
Data10/Okdiario	2–4 Nov	1,000	?	25.2; 98	28.8; 126	16.2; 52	10.3; 24	2.5; 1	3.2; 13	3.8; 5	2.2; 10	1.6; 7	1.1; 5	0.9; 2	0.4; 1	0.7; 2	0.4; 2	0.2; 1	0.1; 1	3.6
EM-Analytics/Electomanía	29 Oct–4 Nov	1,479	?	25.4; 99	27.3; 116	17.4; 58	11.2; 27	3.0; 1	3.4; 14	2.8; 6	2.3; 9	1.5; 6	1.2; 5	0.9; 2	0.5; 1	0.8; 2	0.4; 2	0.3; 1	0.1; 1	1.9
Metroscopia	21 Oct–4 Nov	2,400	66	26.5; 107	25.2; 104	18.0; 66	11.0; 28	2.7; 1	–	3.0; 4	–	–	–	–	–	–	0.4; 2	–	–	1.3
SW Demoscopia	20–30 Oct	1,203	?	25.3; 102/108	25.5; 104/110	17.9; 55/62	11.2; 26/33	3.0; 0/3	3.6 ?	3.4; 2/6	2.1 ?	1.6 ?	1.1 ?	0.9 ?	0.6 ?	–	0.4 ?	0.2 ?	–	0.2
EM-Analytics/Electomanía	22–29 Oct	1,228	?	25.5; 98	27.7; 117	17.3; 58	10.8; 27	2.9; 1	3.3; 13	2.9; 6	2.3; 9	1.6; 7	1.1; 5	0.9; 2	0.5; 1	0.7; 2	0.4; 2	0.3; 1	0.1; 1	2.2
DYM/Henneo	20–24 Oct	1,000	?	24.7; 96/100	29.2; 124/129	14.6; 46/50	13.2; 31/34	3.7; 2	–	2.2; 2/3	–	–	–	–	–	–	–	–	–	4.5
Celeste-Tel/Onda Cero	18–22 Oct	1,100	63.3	26.4; 103	28.9; 123	15.1; 50	10.0; 25	3.4; 2	3.2; 13	4.1; 5	2.2; 8	1.6; 6	1.1; 5	0.9; 2	0.5; 2	0.7; 2	0.4; 2	0.2; 1	0.1; 1	2.5
EM-Analytics/Electomanía	15–22 Oct	1,822	?	25.8; 100	27.9; 118	17.3; 57	10.5; 25	2.7; 1	3.3; 13	3.1; 7	2.3; 9	1.5; 6	1.1; 5	0.9; 2	0.5; 1	0.7; 2	0.4; 2	0.3; 1	0.1; 1	2.1
IMOP/El Confidencial	11–22 Oct	1,338	?	25.8; 101	28.0; 120	15.9; 52	11.0; 28	2.6; 1	3.2; 13	3.5; 4	1.9; 8	1.7; 7	1.2; 5	1.0; 3	0.3; 1	1.1; 3	0.5; 2	0.2; 1	0.1; 1	2.2
Sigma Dos/El Mundo	19–21 Oct	1,928	?	25.5; 99	28.9; 129	15.0; 47	10.9; 25	3.1; 1	3.1; 12	3.1; 7	2.0; 8	1.9; 7	–	–	–	–	–	–	–	3.4
KeyData/Público	20 Oct	?	65.6	25.8; 103	28.2; 121	15.7; 53	10.4; 25	3.0; 1	3.6; 13	3.6; 5	2.1; 8	1.6; 6	1.1; 5	1.0; 2	0.5; 2	? 1	? 2	? 1	? 1	2.4
NC Report/La Razón	13–15 Oct	1,000	63.3	25.4; 101/103	29.6; 127/129	15.1; 47/49	9.6; 22/24	2.7; 1	3.4; 13	3.2; 7	2.2; 8	1.7; 6	1.1; 5	–	–	–	0.4; 2	–	–	4.2
InvyMark/laSexta	11–15 Oct	?	?	25.7	28.4	16.6	9.0	1.5	–	4.2	–	–	–	–	–	–	–	–	–	2.7
EM-Analytics/Electomanía	8–15 Oct	1,863	?	26.2; 102	28.2; 119	16.7; 55	10.4; 25	2.9; 1	3.2; 13	3.0; 6	2.2; 9	1.6; 6	1.1; 5	0.9; 2	0.5; 1	0.7; 2	0.4; 2	0.3; 1	0.1; 1	2.0
Simple Lógica	30 Sep–15 Oct	1,056	64.5	23.8	25.5	17.6	12.4	4.0	–	2.3	–	–	–	–	–	–	–	–	–	1.7
GAD3/ABC	8–14 Oct	1,001	75	26.2; 103	29.2; 123	15.4; 51	10.1; 24	2.8; 2	3.0; 13	2.4; 3	2.0; 8	1.7; 7	1.2; 5	0.9; 3	0.5; 2	0.7; 2	0.4; 2	0.2; 1	0.1; 1	3.0
CIS	1–13 Oct	3,660	?	28.5	22.1	13.2	11.8	6.0	3.1	3.0	1.6	1.3	0.7	0.9	0.4	0.5	0.4	0.1	0.1	6.4
Sigma Dos/Antena 3	11 Oct	?	?	25.1; 100	28.5; 130	14.6; 45	11.1; 24	3.3; 1	3.1; 13	3.4; 7	2.0; 8	1.9; 7	–	–	–	–	–	–	–	3.4
Metroscopia	10 Oct	?	?	26.6	26.2	17.0	10.0	2.5	–	2.4	–	–	–	–	–	–	–	–	–	0.4
EM-Analytics/Electomanía	1–8 Oct	2,119	?	26.6; 105	28.0; 118	16.9; 54	10.0; 24	2.8; 1	3.3; 14	2.8; 6	2.2; 9	1.5; 6	1.1; 5	0.9; 2	0.5; 1	0.6; 1	0.4; 2	0.2; 1	0.1; 1	1.4
IMOP/El Confidencial	27 Sep–8 Oct	1,317	?	25.8; 101	26.8; 115	16.8; 58	10.8; 28	2.6; 1	3.2; 13	4.1; 5	2.0; 8	1.5; 6	1.0; 5	0.9; 2	0.5; 2	0.9; 2	0.4; 2	0.3; 1	0.1; 1	1.0
Data10/Okdiario	5–7 Oct	1,000	?	24.9; 98	29.0; 127	16.0; 52	9.8; 22	2.8; 1	3.3; 14	4.2; 6	2.3; 10	1.6; 7	1.1; 5	0.8; 1	0.4; 1	0.7; 2	0.4; 2	0.3; 1	0.1; 1	4.1
SocioMétrica/El Español	4–7 Oct	1,200	?	25.0; 99	27.2; 118	16.3; 55	11.4; 30	4.3; 2	3.0; 13	3.5; 5	2.1; 8	1.2; 6	1.1; 5	0.9; 2	0.5; 2	0.5; 1	0.4; 2	0.3; 1	0.1; 1	2.2
Hamalgama Métrica/Vozpópuli	1–6 Oct	1,000	65.7	26.2; 103	28.7; 121	15.9; 53	10.1; 24	2.7; 1	3.3; 13	3.6; 6	2.3; 9	1.5; 6	1.1; 5	0.9; 2	0.5; 2	0.6; 1	0.4; 2	0.2; 1	0.1; 1	2.5
EM-Analytics/Electomanía	24 Sep–1 Oct	1,193	?	26.7; 106	27.5; 114	17.0; 56	10.2; 24	3.0; 1	3.4; 14	3.0; 7	2.3; 9	1.6; 6	1.1; 5	0.9; 2	0.5; 1	0.6; 1	0.4; 2	0.2; 1	0.1; 1	0.8
Ágora Integral/Canarias Ahora	23–27 Sep	1,000	61.9	26.1; 103	26.3; 118	15.4; 54	11.5; 30	3.2; 2	3.5; 12	3.7; 5	2.3; 8	1.9; 7	1.2; 5	1.0; 2	0.4; 1	0.5; 1	–	0.3; 1	0.1; 1	0.2
EM-Analytics/Electomanía	17–24 Sep	1,651	?	27.2; 108	27.5; 117	16.5; 52	10.1; 24	3.2; 1	3.3; 14	3.1; 6	2.3; 9	1.6; 6	1.1; 5	0.9; 2	0.5; 1	0.6; 1	0.4; 2	0.3; 1	0.1; 1	0.3
IMOP/El Confidencial	13–24 Sep	1,304	?	26.1; 103	26.6; 113	17.0; 59	10.9; 27	2.6; 1	3.1; 13	3.8; 4	2.1; 8	1.6; 7	1.1; 5	1.0; 3	0.5; 2	0.6; 1	0.4; 2	0.3; 1	0.1; 1	0.5
KeyData/Público	23 Sep	?	64.2	26.0; 104	28.0; 120	15.5; 52	10.2; 25	3.0; 1	3.6; 13	3.6; 5	2.2; 9	1.6; 7	1.1; 5	1.1; 2	0.6; 2	? 1	? 2	? 1	? 1	2.0
Celeste-Tel/Onda Cero	16–21 Sep	1,100	63.6	26.1; 103	29.2; 124	15.1; 50	9.9; 24	3.5; 2	3.2; 13	4.1; 6	2.3; 8	1.5; 6	1.1; 5	0.9; 2	0.4; 1	0.7; 2	0.4; 2	0.2; 1	0.1; 1	3.1
Metroscopia	20 Sep	?	?	26.5	26.2	18.1	9.8	2.0	–	2.2	–	–	–	–	–	–	–	–	–	0.3
Data10/Okdiario	19–20 Sep	1,000	?	25.0; 100	28.7; 126	16.1; 52	9.6; 22	2.9; 1	3.3; 14	4.4; 6	2.4; 10	1.6; 7	1.1; 5	0.8; 1	0.4; 1	0.6; 1	0.4; 2	0.3; 1	0.1; 1	3.7
DYM/Henneo	16–19 Sep	1,000	?	26.0; 105/110	26.1; 108/114	15.6; 50/54	12.8; 30/33	3.9; 2/3	–	3.0; 3/4	–	–	–	–	–	–	–	–	–	0.1
NC Report/La Razón	14–18 Sep	1,000	63.6	25.0; 99/101	29.9; 128/130	14.9; 47/49	9.5; 21/23	2.7; 2	3.3; 12	3.4; 6	2.3; 9	1.7; 6	1.2; 5	–	–	–	0.4; 2	–	–	4.9
EM-Analytics/Electomanía	10–17 Sep	1,233	?	26.0; 103	28.1; 120	16.4; 53	10.4; 25	3.3; 1	3.4; 13	3.1; 6	2.3; 9	1.6; 7	1.1; 5	0.9; 2	0.5; 1	0.6; 1	0.4; 2	0.3; 1	0.1; 1	2.1
GAD3/NIUS	13–16 Sep	1,002	?	26.3; 102/106	28.2; 118/122	15.4; 50/52	11.0; 27/29	2.8; 1	3.8; 14	2.2; 3	2.1; 10	1.6; 7	1.1; 5	0.8; 1	0.5; 2	0.5; 1	0.4; 2	0.2; 1	0.1; 1	1.9
Simple Lógica	1–16 Sep	1,027	64.9	26.2	22.5	17.7	11.3	3.3	–	4.9	–	–	–	–	–	–	–	–	–	3.7
CIS	1–13 Sep	3,780	?	29.6	20.5	13.8	11.3	6.5	3.2	3.3	1.5	1.3	0.9	0.8	0.4	0.5	0.4	0.1	0.1	9.1
IMOP/El Confidencial	30 Aug–10 Sep	1,309	?	26.6; 108	26.4; 113	16.5; 56	10.6; 26	2.9; 1	2.9; 13	3.7; 4	2.1; 8	1.6; 6	1.2; 5	1.0; 3	0.5; 2	0.6; 1	0.4; 2	0.3; 1	0.1; 1	0.2
EM-Analytics/Electomanía	3–9 Sep	1,084	?	25.7; 102	28.6; 121	16.2; 53	10.3; 25	3.3; 1	3.3; 13	3.4; 7	2.3; 9	1.6; 6	1.1; 5	0.9; 2	0.5; 1	0.6; 1	0.4; 2	0.3; 1	0.1; 1	2.9
EM-Analytics/Electomanía	27 Aug–3 Sep	1,640	?	25.3; 97	28.1; 120	16.3; 55	10.5; 26	3.4; 1	3.4; 14	3.6; 8	2.3; 9	1.6; 7	1.1; 5	0.9; 2	0.5; 1	0.6; 1	0.4; 2	0.3; 1	0.1; 1	2.8
Sigma Dos/El Mundo	30 Aug–2 Sep	1,050	?	24.4; 98	29.1; 131	14.9; 47	10.3; 22	3.1; 1	3.4; 14	4.1; 8	2.0; 8	1.9; 8	–	–	–	–	–	–	–	4.7
Data10/Okdiario	30 Aug–1 Sep	1,000	?	24.5; 98	29.8; 129	15.5; 51	9.3; 22	2.8; 1	3.4; 14	4.6; 7	2.4; 9	1.6; 7	1.1; 5	0.8; 1	0.4; 1	0.6; 1	0.4; 2	0.3; 1	0.1; 1	5.4
KeyData/Público	30 Aug	?	63.9	25.3; 101	28.8; 125	15.1; 49	9.7; 23	3.3; 2	3.7; 13	3.7; 7	2.2; 9	1.7; 7	1.2; 5	1.1; 2	0.6; 2	? 1	? 2	? 1	? 1	3.5
Sigma Dos/Antena 3	30 Aug	?	?	24.8; 99	28.9; 132	14.7; 46	9.8; 21	2.9; 1	3.3; 13	4.0; 8	2.1; 8	1.9; 8	–	–	–	–	–	–	–	4.1
NC Report/La Razón	24–27 Aug	1,000	63.8	25.3; 99/101	30.1; 129/131	14.7; 46/48	9.3; 21/23	2.7; 2	3.3; 12	3.4; 6	2.4; 9	1.6; 6	1.2; 5	–	–	–	0.4; 2	–	–	4.8
EM-Analytics/Electomanía	20–26 Aug	1,422	?	25.0; 96	28.6; 124	16.3; 54	10.0; 24	3.4; 1	3.4; 14	3.8; 8	2.3; 9	1.6; 7	1.1; 5	0.9; 2	0.5; 1	0.6; 1	0.4; 2	0.3; 1	0.1; 1	3.6
EM-Analytics/Electomanía	14–21 Aug	2,208	?	25.0; 96	28.5; 122	16.3; 55	10.2; 24	3.4; 2	3.4; 14	3.6; 8	2.3; 9	1.7; 7	1.1; 5	0.9; 2	0.5; 1	0.6; 1	0.4; 2	0.3; 1	0.1; 1	3.5
Celeste-Tel/Onda Cero	16–20 Aug	1,100	64.1	25.7; 102	29.7; 129	14.8; 48	9.7; 21	3.5; 2	3.2; 13	4.5; 7	2.3; 8	1.5; 6	1.1; 5	0.9; 2	0.4; 1	0.7; 2	0.4; 2	0.2; 1	0.1; 1	4.0
EM-Analytics/Electomanía	6–13 Aug	1,399	?	25.0; 96	28.6; 124	16.3; 54	10.0; 24	3.4; 1	3.4; 14	3.8; 8	2.3; 9	1.6; 7	1.1; 5	0.9; 2	0.5; 1	0.6; 1	0.4; 2	0.3; 1	0.1; 1	3.6
Data10/Okdiario	4–6 Aug	1,000	?	24.7; 99	30.0; 131	15.3; 50	8.9; 19	2.9; 1	3.5; 14	4.8; 8	2.3; 9	1.7; 7	1.2; 5	0.7; 1	0.4; 1	0.6; 1	0.4; 2	0.3; 1	0.1; 1	5.3
EM-Analytics/Electomanía	31 Jul–6 Aug	1,170	?	25.0; 98	28.3; 120	16.4; 55	10.1; 25	3.5; 2	3.3; 13	3.7; 8	2.3; 9	1.6; 7	1.1; 5	0.9; 2	0.5; 1	0.6; 1	0.4; 2	0.3; 1	0.1; 1	3.3
Simple Lógica	2–4 Aug	1,062	62.8	27.9	24.6	15.9	10.8	2.9	–	4.6	–	–	–	–	–	–	–	–	–	3.3
EM-Analytics/Electomanía	23–30 Jul	877	?	25.0; 98	28.4; 121	16.5; 55	10.1; 24	3.4; 2	3.3; 13	3.5; 7	2.3; 10	1.6; 7	1.1; 5	0.9; 2	0.5; 1	0.6; 1	0.4; 2	0.3; 1	0.1; 1	3.4
SocioMétrica/El Español	26–29 Jul	1,200	?	24.7; 101	26.4; 116	16.1; 56	10.3; 26	5.0; 3	3.1; 13	4.5; 9	2.3; 10	1.4; 6	0.9; 4	0.8; 1	0.4; 1	0.6; 1	0.3; 1	0.4; 1	0.1; 1	1.7
Celeste-Tel/Onda Cero	20–23 Jul	1,100	64.4	25.6; 101	30.0; 131	14.9; 47	9.6; 21	3.3; 2	3.2; 13	4.6; 7	2.2; 8	1.5; 6	1.1; 5	0.9; 2	0.4; 1	0.7; 2	0.4; 2	0.2; 1	0.1; 1	4.4
EM-Analytics/Electomanía	16–23 Jul	1,601	?	25.4; 99	28.1; 120	17.0; 56	9.9; 24	3.0; 1	3.4; 14	3.5; 7	2.3; 9	1.6; 7	1.1; 5	0.9; 2	0.5; 1	0.6; 1	0.4; 2	0.3; 1	0.1; 1	2.7
KeyData/Público	22 Jul	?	64.3	25.2; 102	28.3; 122	15.7; 52	9.8; 25	3.3; 1	3.6; 13	3.9; 6	2.2; 9	1.6; 6	1.2; 5	1.0; 2	0.5; 2	? 1	? 2	? 1	? 1	3.1
GAD3/ABC	16–22 Jul	1,030	73	25.1; 101	31.1; 139	12.4; 37	10.0; 23	3.5; 2	3.3; 13	3.3; 5	2.4; 10	1.4; 6	1.1; 5	1.0; 2	0.5; 2	0.6; 1	0.4; 2	0.2; 1	0.1; 1	6.0
Sigma Dos/Antena 3	19 Jul	?	?	25.1; 103	28.8; 130	14.1; 44	10.0; 25	2.8; 1	3.4; 13	4.8; 10	2.1; 8	1.8; 8	–	–	–	–	–	–	–	3.7
DYM/Henneo	15–19 Jul	1,019	?	24.0; 96/100	28.0; 121/125	16.7; 54/58	10.5; 23/26	4.0; 2/3	–	2.5; 3/4	–	–	–	–	–	–	–	–	–	4.0
Data10/Okdiario	16–17 Jul	1,000	?	24.5; 97	30.3; 133	15.4; 49	9.0; 17	2.3; 1	3.4; 13	4.9; 10	2.3; 10	1.7; 7	1.1; 5	0.8; 1	0.5; 1	0.6; 1	0.4; 3	0.3; 1	0.1; 1	5.8
NC Report/La Razón	12–16 Jul	1,000	64.2	25.9; 101/103	29.8; 126/128	15.3; 50/52	9.2; 20/22	2.7; 1	3.3; 13	3.7; 6	2.4; 9	1.6; 6	1.2; 5	–	–	–	0.4; 2	–	–	3.9
InvyMark/laSexta	12–16 Jul	?	?	26.2	28.0	17.7	9.3	1.4	–	4.5	–	–	–	–	–	–	–	–	–	1.8
EM-Analytics/Electomanía	11–16 Jul	2,001	?	25.4; 99	27.7; 117	17.3; 58	10.0; 24	2.9; 1	3.4; 14	3.8; 8	2.2; 9	1.7; 7	1.1; 5	0.9; 2	0.5; 1	0.6; 1	0.4; 2	0.3; 1	0.1; 1	2.3
Metroscopia	15 Jul	?	?	26.0	28.4	14.7	11.1	2.5	–	3.0	–	–	–	–	–	–	–	–	–	2.4
GESOP/El Periódico	14–15 Jul	802	?	27.3; 118/120	26.0; 116/118	13.1; 40/42	10.0; 24/26	3.9; 2/3	3.4; 12/14	3.8; 4/6	–	–	–	–	–	–	–	–	–	1.3
CIS (SocioMétrica)	2–15 Jul	3,798	62.2	25.1	26.8	15.6	10.1	3.1	3.7	4.0	2.1	1.2	0.8	0.7	0.6	1.0	0.4	0.1	0.1	1.7
CIS	2–15 Jul	3,798	?	28.6	23.4	13.6	10.6	5.5	3.3	3.7	1.9	1.4	0.7	0.7	0.3	0.8	0.3	0.2	0.1	5.2
Simple Lógica	5–12 Jul	1,076	64.9	23.0	26.9	17.4	12.1	2.4	–	3.5	–	–	–	–	–	–	–	–	–	3.9
EM-Analytics/Electomanía	8–10 Jul	1,883	?	26.0; 101	27.9; 118	16.7; 55	9.9; 24	2.9; 1	3.4; 14	3.9; 8	2.2; 9	1.7; 7	1.1; 5	0.9; 2	0.5; 1	0.6; 1	0.4; 2	0.3; 1	0.1; 1	1.9
InvyMark/laSexta	28 Jun–2 Jul	?	?	25.9	28.3	18.1	8.9	1.5	–	4.4	–	–	–	–	–	–	–	–	–	2.4
EM-Analytics/Electomanía	24 Jun–2 Jul	2,539	?	24.9; 95	28.4; 124	16.3; 54	10.1; 25	3.1; 1	3.4; 14	4.2; 8	2.2; 9	1.7; 7	1.1; 5	0.9; 2	0.5; 0	0.6; 1	0.4; 2	0.3; 1	0.1; 1	3.5
Data10/Okdiario	29 Jun–1 Jul	1,000	?	24.3; 96	30.2; 134	15.5; 49	9.1; 18	2.8; 1	3.3; 13	5.0; 10	2.3; 10	1.7; 7	1.1; 5	0.8; 1	0.4; 1	0.6; 1	0.4; 2	0.3; 1	0.1; 1	5.9
Sigma Dos/El Mundo	28 Jun–1 Jul	1,020	?	25.9; 103	29.4; 130	14.4; 44	10.5; 25	2.5; 1	3.0; 12	5.0; 10	1.8; 7	1.5; 8	–	–	–	–	–	–	–	3.5
SocioMétrica/El Español	27 Jun	?	?	24.1; 96	26.2; 115	16.6; 58	10.4; 26	5.2; 4	3.1; 13	4.6; 9	2.3; 10	1.5; 7	1.0; 5	0.8; 1	0.4; 1	0.5; 1	0.3; 2	0.4; 1	0.1; 1	2.1
EM-Analytics/Electomanía	24–26 Jun	1,627	?	25.1; 97	28.6; 123	16.2; 54	10.0; 24	3.0; 1	3.4; 14	4.1; 8	2.3; 9	1.7; 7	1.1; 5	0.9; 2	0.5; 1	0.6; 1	0.4; 2	0.3; 1	0.1; 1	3.5
NC Report/La Razón	23–26 Jun	1,000	63.8	24.7; 97/99	30.4; 129/131	15.1; 49/51	9.0; 19/21	2.6; 1	3.3; 13	4.6; 5/7	2.4; 9	1.7; 7	1.2; 5	–	–	–	0.4; 2	–	–	5.7
KeyData/Público	21 Jun	?	67.4	25.2; 103	28.2; 121	15.8; 52	9.7; 25	3.0; 1	3.5; 13	4.3; 7	2.1; 8	1.6; 6	1.2; 5	1.0; 2	0.5; 2	? 1	? 2	? 1	? 1	3.0
Sigma Dos/Antena 3	21 Jun	?	?	24.5; 96	30.1; 133	15.5; 48	11.4; 27	2.5; 1	3.5; 16	4.4; 9	1.9; 7	2.0; 9	–	–	–	–	–	–	–	5.6
DYM/Henneo	17–21 Jun	1,002	?	25.7; 101/105	27.9; 120/125	16.0; 53/57	9.9; 21/24	3.5; 2/3	–	2.3; 2/3	–	–	–	–	–	–	–	–	–	2.2
Metroscopia	20 Jun	?	?	26.1	30.2	14.6	10.5	2.0	–	4.4	–	–	–	–	–	–	–	–	–	4.1
Celeste-Tel/Onda Cero	14–18 Jun	1,100	64.2	25.3; 98	29.8; 131	15.5; 49	9.5; 21	2.4; 1	3.2; 13	5.7; 9	2.2; 8	1.4; 6	1.1; 5	0.9; 2	0.4; 1	0.7; 2	0.4; 2	0.2; 1	0.1; 1	4.5
EM-Analytics/Electomanía	12–18 Jun	1,332	?	25.9; 102	28.6; 121	15.8; 51	9.6; 23	3.0; 1	3.4; 14	4.0; 9	2.3; 9	1.7; 7	1.2; 5	1.0; 2	0.5; 1	0.6; 1	0.4; 2	0.3; 1	0.1; 1	2.7
CIS	2–15 Jun	3,814	?	27.4	23.9	13.0	12.0	5.7	3.6	4.1	1.6	1.4	1.0	0.8	0.2	0.7	0.4	0.1	0.1	3.5
EM-Analytics/Electomanía	5–11 Jun	1,673	?	25.3; 99	28.4; 121	16.2; 54	10.0; 24	3.1; 1	3.4; 14	3.9; 8	2.3; 9	1.7; 7	1.2; 5	0.9; 2	0.5; 1	0.6; 1	0.4; 2	0.3; 1	0.1; 1	3.1
GAD3/NIUS	7–10 Jun	1,026	65	25.5; 101/103	30.7; 136/138	12.4; 37/39	9.2; 19/21	2.9; 1/2	3.0; 11/12	4.5; 8	2.6; 10/11	1.4; 6/7	1.2; 5	1.1; 2	0.6; 2	0.7; 2	0.4; 2	0.2; 1	0.1; 1	5.2
Simple Lógica	1–9 Jun	1,017	64.4	23.0	27.1	17.0	9.3	3.4	–	6.0	–	–	–	–	–	–	–	–	–	4.1
EM-Analytics/Electomanía	30 May–4 Jun	1,462	?	25.4; 98	27.9; 121	16.8; 55	10.4; 25	3.0; 1	3.5; 14	3.5; 7	2.3; 9	1.7; 7	1.1; 5	0.9; 2	0.5; 1	0.6; 1	0.4; 2	0.3; 1	0.1; 1	2.5
Data10/Okdiario	1–3 Jun	1,000	?	25.5; 103	28.7; 124	15.8; 52	8.6; 18	2.7; 1	3.3; 13	5.2; 10	2.4; 10	1.6; 6	1.1; 5	0.8; 1	0.5; 2	0.6; 1	0.4; 2	0.3; 1	0.1; 1	3.6
Sigma Dos/El Mundo	31 May–1 Jun	1,000	?	25.0; 100	29.5; 132	15.4; 51	10.2; 24	3.2; 2	3.2; 10	4.3; 9	1.8; 8	1.7; 7	–	–	–	–	–	–	–	4.5
SocioMétrica/El Español	26–29 May	1,100	?	25.4; 102	26.5; 114	16.9; 60	9.3; 20	3.1; 1	3.6; 14	4.0; 7	2.6; 11	1.7; 8	1.2; 5	0.9; 2	0.4; 1	0.5; 1	0.4; 2	0.2; 1	0.1; 1	1.1
EM-Analytics/Electomanía	23–28 May	1,272	?	25.4; 97	27.9; 121	16.7; 55	10.7; 26	3.0; 1	3.5; 14	3.5; 7	2.3; 9	1.7; 7	1.1; 5	0.9; 2	0.5; 1	0.6; 1	0.4; 2	0.3; 1	0.1; 1	2.5
DYM/Henneo	21–24 May	1,008	?	24.5; 99/103	28.1; 121/126	16.0; 53/57	9.3; 20/22	3.4; 2/3	–	5.0; 4/6	–	–	–	–	–	–	–	–	–	3.6
NC Report/La Razón	17–22 May	1,000	64.2	25.8; 100/102	30.0; 127/129	14.9; 48/50	9.2; 19/21	2.9; 1/2	3.3; 13	3.9; 4/6	2.3; 9	1.6; 7	1.2; 5	–	–	–	0.4; 2	–	–	4.2
EM-Analytics/Electomanía	17–22 May	1,582	?	25.2; 97	27.3; 119	16.4; 55	11.0; 27	2.9; 1	3.5; 14	3.3; 7	2.4; 10	1.7; 7	1.2; 5	0.9; 2	0.5; 1	0.6; 1	0.4; 2	0.3; 1	0.1; 1	2.1
InvyMark/laSexta	17–21 May	?	?	26.9	27.2	18.4	8.2	1.4	–	4.8	–	–	–	–	–	–	–	–	–	0.3
KeyData/Público	20 May	?	68.9	26.2; 110	27.0; 115	16.4; 54	10.2; 25	3.5; 1	3.5; 13	3.3; 4	2.2; 8	1.5; 6	1.2; 5	1.0; 2	0.5; 2	? 1	? 2	? 1	? 1	0.8
Metroscopia	20 May	?	?	22.8	30.3	12.2	11.3	2.2	–	6.7	–	–	–	–	–	–	–	–	–	7.5
GAD3/ABC	12–18 May	1,202	74	25.4; 103	30.5; 138	13.8; 40	8.3; 17	3.3; 2	3.0; 13	4.1; 6	2.4; 10	1.8; 7	1.2; 5	1.0; 2	0.4; 1	0.7; 2	0.4; 2	0.2; 1	0.1; 1	5.1
Sigma Dos/Antena 3	17 May	?	?	26.0; 101	30.7; 133	15.7; 49	10.0; 23	3.1; 1	3.0; 12	4.0; 7	2.0; 8	1.9; 7	–	–	–	–	–	–	–	4.7
EM-Analytics/Electomanía	10–15 May	1,930	?	26.4; 107	26.9; 115	15.8; 52	10.9; 26	2.9; 1	3.5; 13	2.9; 6	2.4; 10	1.7; 7	1.2; 5	0.9; 2	0.5; 1	0.6; 1	0.4; 2	0.3; 1	0.1; 1	0.5
Celeste-Tel/Onda Cero	10–14 May	1,100	64.5	26.0; 100	28.1; 117	16.2; 59	9.6; 25	2.5; 1	3.2; 13	6.0; 9	2.0; 7	1.3; 6	1.1; 5	0.9; 2	0.4; 1	0.6; 1	0.4; 2	0.3; 1	0.1; 1	2.1
CIS	4–13 May	3,814	?	27.9	23.4	13.7	10.4	5.3	3.0	3.8	1.6	1.1	1.1	0.6	0.3	0.5	0.4	0.2	0.1	4.5
Simple Lógica	4–12 May	1,063	65.5	26.0	26.2	15.9	8.7	4.0	–	4.0	–	–	–	–	–	–	–	–	–	0.2
Hamalgama Métrica/Okdiario	10–11 May	1,000	?	25.5; 99	27.3; 111	17.9; 67	9.0; 23	2.3; 1	3.1; 13	5.9; 10	2.3; 8	1.6; 6	1.3; 5	0.9; 1	0.5; 1	0.6; 1	0.4; 2	0.2; 1	0.1; 1	1.8
NC Report/La Razón	4–8 May	1,000	64.4	26.1; 106/108	26.9; 109/111	17.1; 59/61	9.9; 23/25	2.8; 1/2	3.4; 13	3.7; 5/7	2.3; 8	1.5; 6	1.3; 5	? 1	–	–	0.4; 2	–	–	0.8
InvyMark/laSexta	5–7 May	?	?	26.7	27.3	18.9	7.9	1.2	–	4.4	–	–	–	–	–	–	–	–	–	0.6
Sigma Dos/El Mundo	5–6 May	1,000	?	25.7	30.2	15.2	13.0	3.6	3.1	2.0	2.0	1.9	–	–	–	–	–	–	–	4.5
Demoscopia y Servicios/ESdiario	5–6 May	1,000	?	25.3; 107	25.9; 113	16.9; 61	10.3; 19	2.3; 1	3.4; 12	5.1; 8	2.7; 10	1.6; 6	1.3; 5	1.0; 2	0.4; 1	0.6; 1	0.4; 2	0.3; 1	0.1; 1	0.6
EM-Analytics/Electomanía	4–6 May	1,825	?	26.9; 108	25.8; 110	16.6; 57	11.4; 28	3.2; 1	3.5; 13	2.1; 4	2.5; 10	1.6; 6	1.3; 5	0.9; 2	0.5; 1	0.6; 1	0.4; 2	0.3; 1	0.1; 1	1.1
EM-Analytics/Electomanía	24 Apr–2 May	4,320	?	27.1; 113	24.0; 100	16.9; 59	12.3; 31	4.0; 3	3.6; 13	1.7; 3	2.3; 8	1.6; 6	1.3; 5	0.9; 2	0.5; 1	0.6; 1	0.4; 2	0.3; 1	0.1; 1	3.1
EM-Analytics/Electomanía	18–24 Apr	3,125	?	27.0; 112	23.9; 99	16.9; 59	12.5; 33	4.0; 3	3.6; 14	1.6; 3	2.3; 8	1.6; 6	1.3; 5	0.9; 2	0.5; 0	0.6; 1	0.4; 2	0.3; 1	0.1; 1	3.1
EM-Analytics/Electomanía	10–17 Apr	2,450	?	26.6; 107	24.2; 99	17.2; 63	12.4; 31	3.8; 3	3.6; 14	1.7; 3	2.4; 8	1.6; 7	1.3; 5	0.9; 2	0.5; 2	0.6; 1	0.4; 2	0.3; 1	0.1; 1	2.4
GAD3/NIUS	14–16 Apr	1,001	63	28.7; 121/123	27.0; 114/116	14.5; 46/48	9.2; 18/20	4.5; 3	3.2; 13/14	2.3; 3	2.0; 8	1.9; 7/8	1.1; 5	0.8; 1	0.4; 1	0.6; 1	0.4; 2	0.2; 1	0.1; 1	1.7
InvyMark/laSexta	12–16 Apr	?	?	28.0	24.5	18.3	9.3	3.6	–	–	–	–	–	–	–	–	–	–	–	3.5
Metroscopia	15 Apr	?	?	29.8	24.1	17.6	11.2	2.1	–	1.7	–	–	–	–	–	–	–	–	–	5.7
CIS (SocioMétrica)	5–14 Apr	3,823	62.6	30.0	20.8	18.8	10.8	4.0	3.2	2.3	1.2	1.7	0.9	0.6	0.2	0.4	0.3	0.0	0.1	9.2
CIS	5–14 Apr	3,823	?	31.5	20.6	15.4	10.7	6.7	2.8	1.9	1.5	1.5	0.9	0.6	0.3	0.5	0.4	–	–	10.9
Simple Lógica	5–13 Apr	1,053	65.6	27.9	22.9	17.6	11.1	3.8	–	2.6	–	–	–	–	–	–	–	–	–	5.0
EM-Analytics/Electomanía	2–9 Apr	2,300	?	26.2; 106	24.1; 99	17.0; 61	12.8; 34	3.9; 3	3.6; 14	1.7; 3	2.4; 8	1.6; 7	1.3; 5	0.9; 2	0.5; 2	0.6; 1	0.4; 2	0.3; 1	0.1; 1	2.1
EM-Analytics/Electomanía	26 Mar–2 Apr	2,000	?	26.5; 107	24.1; 101	16.8; 60	13.0; 35	3.7; 2	3.6; 13	1.7; 3	2.5; 9	1.6; 7	1.3; 5	0.9; 2	0.5; 1	0.6; 1	0.4; 2	0.3; 1	0.1; 1	2.4
NC Report/La Razón	26–31 Mar	1,000	63.1	26.6; 108/110	24.8; 105/107	17.4; 59/61	11.5; 28/30	4.0; 1/3	3.3; 13	2.5; 3	2.2; 8	1.5; 6	1.3; 5	? 1	? 2	? 2	0.4; 2	? 1	? 1	1.8
EM-Analytics/Electomanía	22–26 Mar	2,000	?	26.4; 107	24.5; 104	16.6; 56	13.4; 37	3.2; 1	3.5; 13	1.7; 3	2.6; 9	1.6; 7	1.3; 5	0.9; 2	0.5; 1	0.5; 1	0.4; 2	0.3; 1	0.1; 1	1.9
EM-Analytics/Electomanía	16–20 Mar	2,513	?	26.2; 105	24.5; 103	16.7; 57	13.7; 39	2.8; 1	3.6; 14	1.7; 3	2.6; 9	1.6; 7	1.3; 5	0.9; 1	0.5; 1	0.5; 1	0.4; 2	0.3; 1	0.1; 1	1.7
InvyMark/laSexta	15–19 Mar	?	?	28.4	23.9	18.6	9.8	4.4	–	–	–	–	–	–	–	–	–	–	–	4.5
EM-Analytics/Electomanía	15 Mar	2,400	?	26.2; 103	24.6; 103	16.6; 56	13.4; 38	2.4; 1	3.6; 14	1.8; 4	2.5; 9	1.6; 7	1.4; 5	1.1; 2	0.5; 2	0.7; 2	0.4; 2	0.3; 1	0.1; 1	1.6
Metroscopia	15 Mar	?	?	27.9	20.9	19.9	11.8	3.0	–	1.7	–	–	–	–	–	–	–	–	–	7.0
EM-Analytics/Electomanía	12–13 Mar	2,576	?	29.9; 123	23.0; 92	18.1; 64	9.9; 21	2.5; 1	3.6; 14	1.9; 4	2.5; 10	1.6; 6	1.4; 5	1.0; 2	0.5; 2	0.7; 2	0.4; 2	0.3; 1	0.1; 1	6.9
CIS	1–11 Mar	3,820	?	31.3	17.9	15.0	9.6	9.5	3.2	2.0	1.5	1.7	1.0	0.8	0.2	0.6	0.4	–	0.1	13.4
Simple Lógica	1–9 Mar	1,023	64.6	27.1	17.5	18.5	11.0	7.6	–	2.7	–	–	–	–	–	–	–	–	–	8.6
InvyMark/laSexta	1–5 Mar	?	?	26.8	23.2	17.4	10.3	6.6	–	–	–	–	–	–	–	–	–	–	–	3.6
EM-Analytics/Electomanía	28 Feb–5 Mar	1,406	?	28.5; 118	21.2; 90	18.9; 68	10.5; 25	4.9; 4	3.4; 13	1.8; 3	2.4; 9	1.4; 6	1.3; 5	0.9; 2	0.5; 1	0.7; 2	0.4; 2	0.3; 1	0.1; 1	7.3
Sigma Dos/El Mundo	1–3 Mar	1,096	?	27.2	22.9	17.4	11.7	5.4	3.2	0.9	2.0	2.1	–	–	–	–	–	–	–	4.3
KeyData/Público	1 Mar	?	68.5	27.8; 119	21.3; 90	17.7; 64	11.1; 28	5.7; 6	3.6; 13	1.6; 2	2.2; 8	1.5; 6	1.2; 5	1.0; 2	0.5; 2	? 1	? 2	? 1	? 1	6.5
NC Report/La Razón	24–28 Feb	1,000	63.3	27.4; 115/117	23.7; 97/99	18.0; 60/62	10.9; 27/29	4.3; 3/4	3.3; 13	2.5 ?	2.2; 8/9	1.5; 6	1.3; 5	–	–	–	0.4; 2	–	–	3.7
EM-Analytics/Electomanía	20–27 Feb	1,406	?	29.0; 121	20.8; 84	19.0; 70	10.5; 25	5.0; 4	3.4; 13	1.7; 3	2.5; 10	1.3; 6	1.4; 6	0.8; 1	0.5; 1	0.7; 2	0.4; 2	0.3; 1	0.1; 1	8.2
GAD3/NIUS	22–25 Feb	1,000	62	28.6; 120/124	22.2; 92/96	17.1; 59/61	10.1; 22/24	5.9; 7	3.7; 13	1.5; 2	2.2; 8	1.7; 6/7	1.2; 5	1.1; 1/2	0.4; 1/2	0.6; 2	0.4; 2	0.2; 1	0.1; 1	6.4
DYM/Henneo	19–23 Feb	1,002	?	25.4; 116/120	19.6; 86/90	18.1; 66/69	12.5; 32/35	7.5; 9/12	–	–	–	–	–	–	–	–	–	–	–	5.8
Celeste-Tel/Onda Cero	17–23 Feb	1,100	64.4	28.3; 118	22.3; 96	18.2; 60	10.1; 25	4.6; 5	3.6; 14	2.6; 3	2.1; 8	1.6; 6	1.2; 5	1.1; 2	0.5; 2	0.7; 2	0.4; 2	0.3; 1	0.1; 1	6.0
Hamalgama Métrica/Okdiario	19–22 Feb	1,000	?	28.7; 118	22.1; 91	19.1; 64	9.9; 26	3.1; 3	3.4; 14	2.4 ?	–	? 6	? 5	–	–	–	0.4; 2	–	–	6.6
ElectoPanel/Electomanía	17–20 Feb	1,406	?	29.4; 123	20.9; 88	18.4; 65	10.0; 20	5.6; 7	3.4; 13	1.7; 3	2.4; 10	1.3; 6	1.4; 6	0.8; 1	0.5; 2	0.7; 2	0.4; 2	0.3; 1	0.1; 1	8.5
Sigma Dos/El Mundo	15–17 Feb	1,145	?	27.6	23.4	15.6	11.9	6.3	3.2	0.9	2.2	2.0	–	–	–	–	–	–	–	4.2
ElectoPanel/Electomanía	14–16 Feb	1,240	?	29.0; 123	21.6; 89	17.9; 63	10.2; 23	5.6; 6	3.4; 13	1.7; 3	2.4; 10	1.3; 6	1.4; 6	0.8; 1	0.5; 1	0.7; 2	0.4; 2	0.3; 1	0.1; 1	7.4
Metroscopia	15 Feb	?	?	28.7	19.6	19.1	11.3	4.6	–	1.9	–	–	–	–	–	–	–	–	–	9.1
ElectoPanel/Electomanía	6–12 Feb	2,530	?	27.3; 117	22.9; 97	15.8; 53	10.7; 26	7.5; 12	3.3; 13	1.7; 3	2.4; 9	1.5; 6	1.4; 5	0.8; 1	0.5; 2	0.7; 2	0.4; 2	0.3; 1	0.1; 1	4.4
CIS (SocioMétrica)	3–11 Feb	3,869	64.7	28.1	19.7	16.3	11.3	9.0	3.3	2.6	1.3	1.2	0.7	1.1	0.2	0.7	0.3	0.2	0.3	8.4
CIS	3–11 Feb	3,869	?	30.7	18.8	13.6	11.2	9.3	3.5	1.7	1.3	1.5	0.8	0.9	0.4	0.7	0.4	0.2	0.1	11.9
ElectoPanel/Electomanía	30 Jan–6 Feb	1,814	?	27.2; 117	23.5; 101	15.2; 49	10.8; 26	7.4; 12	3.4; 13	1.8; 3	2.3; 9	1.5; 6	1.3; 5	0.8; 1	0.5; 2	0.7; 2	0.4; 2	0.3; 1	0.1; 1	3.7
Simple Lógica	1–5 Feb	1,054	62.0	28.8	18.8	16.9	10.3	9.2	–	2.2	–	–	–	–	–	–	–	–	–	10.0
ElectoPanel/Electomanía	22–29 Jan	1,493	?	27.0; 116	23.4; 102	15.4; 50	11.0; 26	7.3; 12	3.4; 13	1.8; 3	2.3; 9	1.5; 6	1.3; 5	0.8; 1	0.5; 1	0.7; 2	0.4; 2	0.3; 1	0.1; 1	3.6
CIS (SocioMétrica)	7–25 Jan	3,862	62.6	28.6	22.2	15.9	10.0	7.4	2.9	1.9	1.6	1.7	0.8	0.7	0.3	0.6	0.8	0.1	0.0	6.4
CIS	7–25 Jan	3,862	?	30.7	20.5	13.0	10.7	9.3	2.9	1.5	1.5	1.6	0.9	0.6	0.5	0.5	0.6	0.3	–	10.2
ElectoPanel/Electomanía	18–22 Jan	1,470	?	27.1; 116	23.2; 101	15.6; 51	11.0; 26	7.3; 12	3.4; 13	1.7; 3	2.3; 9	1.5; 6	1.3; 5	0.8; 1	0.5; 1	0.7; 2	0.4; 2	0.3; 1	0.1; 1	3.9
InvyMark/laSexta	18–22 Jan	?	?	27.0	23.2	16.9	10.2	7.0	–	–	–	–	–	–	–	–	–	–	–	3.8
Metroscopia	15 Jan	?	?	27.2	22.8	16.5	11.5	6.4	–	1.8	–	–	–	–	–	–	–	–	–	4.4
Celeste-Tel/Onda Cero	11–15 Jan	1,100	64.7	27.0; 113	23.7; 101	14.8; 51	11.8; 30	6.7; 9	3.9; 14	2.5; 3	2.2; 8	1.6; 6	1.2; 5	1.0; 2	0.5; 2	0.9; 2	0.4; 2	0.3; 1	0.1; 1	3.3
ElectoPanel/Electomanía	11–15 Jan	1,382	?	27.2; 118	23.1; 97	15.8; 53	11.1; 27	7.1; 11	3.3; 13	1.7; 3	2.3; 9	1.5; 6	1.3; 5	0.8; 1	0.5; 2	0.7; 1	0.4; 2	0.3; 1	0.1; 1	4.1
Hamalgama Métrica/Okdiario	12–14 Jan	1,000	?	26.4; 109	24.4; 103	15.6; 55	12.5; 31	5.2; 7	3.8; 14	? 2	? 9	? 6	? 5	? 1	? 2	? 2	0.4; 2	? 1	? 1	2.0
Simple Lógica	4–13 Jan	1,045	66.3	26.3	21.1	15.2	10.7	8.9	–	2.6	–	–	–	–	–	–	–	–	–	5.2
SyM Consulting	7–10 Jan	2,915	70.0	26.7	24.6	14.2	9.6	6.6	3.7	–	2.0	1.6	1.1	–	–	–	–	–	–	2.1
ElectoPanel/Electomanía	3–9 Jan	1,562	?	27.2; 117	22.8; 96	16.1; 55	11.2; 28	6.9; 10	3.3; 13	1.7; 3	2.4; 9	1.5; 6	1.3; 5	0.8; 1	0.5; 2	0.6; 1	0.4; 2	0.3; 1	0.1; 1	4.4
SocioMétrica/El Español	28 Dec–5 Jan	1,206	?	26.7; 112	22.9; 97	16.7; 60	10.5; 25	6.7; 10	3.4; 13	2.5; 3	2.7; 10	1.8; 7	1.3; 5	–	0.8; 3	0.6; 2	0.3; 1	0.3; 1	0.1; 1	3.8
ElectoPanel/Electomanía	28 Dec–2 Jan	1,321	?	27.3; 117	23.0; 97	16.0; 54	11.2; 28	6.8; 10	3.3; 13	1.7; 3	2.4; 9	1.5; 6	1.3; 5	0.8; 1	0.5; 2	0.6; 1	0.4; 2	0.3; 1	0.1; 1	4.3

=== 2020 ===
Polling firm/Commissioner	Fieldwork date	Sample size	Turnout	PSOE	PP	Vox	Unidas Podemos	Cs	ERC–Sobiranistes	Más País	JxCat Junts	PNV	EH Bildu	CUP	CC–NCa	BNG	NA+	PRC	TE	Lead
NC Report/La Razón	18–30 Dec	1,000	62.8	26.2; 110/112	24.3; 102/104	15.2; 51/52	11.7; 30/31	6.7; 10/11	3.5; 13/14	2.2; 2	2.3; 8/9	1.5; 6	1.2; 5	1.0; 1	0.4; 1/2	1.0; 2	0.4; 2	0.2; 1	0.1; 1	1.9
Sigma Dos/El Mundo	22–29 Dec	1,144	?	27.9	25.2	13.5	10.8	7.6	3.3	1.0	2.1	1.9	–	–	–	–	–	–	–	2.7
ElectoPanel/Electomanía	21–25 Dec	1,413	?	27.4; 116	22.7; 95	16.3; 57	11.3; 29	6.7; 10	3.3; 13	1.7; 3	2.4; 9	1.5; 6	1.3; 5	0.8; 1	0.5; 1	0.6; 1	0.4; 2	0.3; 1	0.1; 1	4.7
KeyData/Público	24 Dec	?	67.3	27.0; 116	22.8; 97	15.6; 55	11.1; 27	7.5; 11	3.5; 13	2.3; 3	2.2; 9	1.6; 6	1.1; 5	0.9; 1	0.5; 2	? 1	? 2	? 1	? 1	4.2
InvyMark/laSexta	14–18 Dec	?	?	27.4	23.0	16.1	10.2	7.7	–	–	–	–	–	–	–	–	–	–	–	4.4
DYM/Henneo	15–17 Dec	1,000	?	24.0; 104/107	22.9; 99/103	17.4; 59/63	10.4; 24/27	8.2; 13/15	–	–	–	–	–	–	–	–	–	–	–	1.1
ElectoPanel/Electomanía	15–17 Dec	1,413	?	27.3; 114	22.3; 93	16.6; 59	11.4; 29	6.5; 10	3.4; 13	1.6; 3	2.5; 10	1.6; 6	1.3; 5	0.8; 1	0.5; 1	0.7; 2	0.4; 2	0.3; 1	0.1; 1	5.0
Metroscopia	15 Dec	?	?	27.0	21.9	16.9	11.1	6.2	–	1.3	–	–	–	–	–	–	–	–	–	5.1
Celeste-Tel/Onda Cero	9–15 Dec	1,100	64.5	27.1; 114	23.3; 99	14.9; 51	12.0; 31	6.5; 9	3.8; 14	2.7; 3	2.2; 8	1.6; 6	1.1; 5	1.0; 2	0.5; 2	0.9; 2	0.4; 2	0.3; 1	0.1; 1	3.8
GAD3/COPE	30 Nov–14 Dec	2,005	64	28.0; 123	25.2; 108	13.1; 41	9.5; 20	7.1; 11	3.4; 15	1.4; 2	1.8; 7	1.7; 6	1.5; 7	0.8; 1	0.6; 2	1.0; 3	0.4; 2	0.3; 1	0.1; 1	2.8
ElectoPanel/Electomanía	7–11 Dec	1,532	?	27.5; 114	21.8; 91	17.0; 61	11.6; 29	6.3; 10	3.4; 13	1.5; 3	2.6; 10	1.6; 6	1.3; 5	0.8; 1	0.5; 1	0.7; 2	0.4; 2	0.2; 1	0.1; 1	5.7
CIS	1–9 Dec	3,817	?	29.5	19.2	14.0	10.8	10.5	2.9	2.4	1.7	1.4	1.2	0.8	0.5	0.5	0.4	0.1	0.0	10.3
Simple Lógica	30 Nov–9 Dec	1,065	64.8	27.9	19.9	16.2	11.6	7.7	–	–	–	–	–	–	–	–	–	–	–	8.0
Sigma Dos/Antena 3	7 Dec	?	?	28.5	25.5	13.4	12.1	7.0	3.3	0.8	2.1	1.9	–	–	–	–	–	–	–	3.0
Hamalgama Métrica/Okdiario	2–5 Dec	1,000	?	26.2; 108	23.8; 99	15.9; 58	13.0; 32	5.3; 8	3.7; 13	? 3	? 9	? 6	? 5	? 1	? 2	? 2	0.4; 2	? 1	? 1	2.4
ElectoPanel/Electomanía	2–5 Dec	1,670	?	27.2; 113	21.6; 91	17.2; 61	11.9; 30	6.4; 10	3.3; 13	1.5; 3	2.6; 10	1.6; 6	1.3; 5	0.8; 1	0.5; 1	0.7; 2	0.4; 2	0.2; 1	0.1; 1	5.6
SW Demoscopia/infoLibre	26 Nov–5 Dec	1,237	?	28.4; 122	20.7; 89	17.2; 59	11.1; 27	8.4; 10	? 13	–	–	–	–	–	–	–	–	–	–	7.7
ElectoPanel/Electomanía	22–27 Nov	1,310	?	27.2; 112	21.4; 90	17.4; 64	11.8; 30	6.6; 10	3.3; 13	1.5; 3	2.5; 10	1.6; 6	1.3; 5	0.8; 1	0.5; 0	0.7; 2	0.4; 2	0.3; 1	0.1; 1	5.8
KeyData/Público	24 Nov	?	66.9	27.3; 117	22.4; 93	15.9; 57	10.8; 30	6.9; 9	3.6; 13	2.4; 3	2.2; 9	1.7; 6	1.1; 5	0.9; 1	0.4; 2	? 1	? 2	? 1	? 1	4.9
DYM/Henneo	18–20 Nov	1,001	?	23.6; 103/106	23.5; 104/107	17.2; 56/60	9.8; 23/26	8.9; 15/17	–	–	–	–	–	–	–	–	–	–	–	0.1
ElectoPanel/Electomanía	16–20 Nov	2,398	?	27.2; 117	21.1; 89	17.0; 60	11.7; 29	6.4; 10	3.4; 13	2.5; 3	2.7; 10	1.5; 6	1.3; 5	0.7; 1	0.5; 1	0.7; 2	0.4; 2	0.2; 1	0.1; 1	6.1
Metroscopia	15 Nov	?	?	26.5	24.3	15.3	11.5	6.0	–	1.5	–	–	–	–	–	–	–	–	–	2.2
ElectoPanel/Electomanía	10–13 Nov	1,290	?	26.7; 111	20.8; 90	17.4; 63	11.5; 30	6.9; 10	3.3; 13	2.5; 3	2.7; 11	1.5; 6	1.3; 5	0.7; 1	0.5; 1	0.7; 2	0.4; 2	0.2; 1	0.1; 1	5.9
CIS (SocioMétrica)	3–12 Nov	3,853	62.5	28.8	18.0	16.8	11.6	8.5	2.9	2.1	1.7	1.2	1.0	0.8	0.3	0.5	0.5	0.3	0.1	10.8
CIS	3–12 Nov	3,853	?	30.4	18.6	13.2	11.4	9.5	3.2	1.8	1.7	1.5	0.7	0.7	0.4	0.6	0.4	–	–	11.8
Simple Lógica	4–11 Nov	1,036	63.4	29.2	20.5	15.7	11.5	5.1	–	–	–	–	–	–	–	–	–	–	–	8.7
Celeste-Tel/Onda Cero	4–9 Nov	1,100	64.2	27.7; 116	22.5; 95	15.3; 54	11.8; 30	6.7; 10	3.8; 14	2.5; 3	2.1; 8	1.5; 6	1.2; 5	1.0; 1	0.5; 2	0.9; 2	0.4; 2	0.2; 1	0.1; 1	5.2
ElectoPanel/Electomanía	6–7 Nov	1,263	?	26.8; 113	20.6; 86	17.5; 63	11.5; 32	7.1; 11	3.3; 13	2.4; 2	2.7; 11	1.5; 6	1.3; 5	0.7; 1	0.5; 1	0.7; 2	0.4; 2	0.2; 1	0.1; 1	6.2
NC Report/La Razón	30 Oct–7 Nov	1,000	63.1	26.8; 112/113	23.2; 97/98	15.9; 55/56	11.5; 29/30	7.2; 10/11	3.5; 12/13	2.1; 2	2.5; 9/10	1.5; 6	1.3; 5	0.8; 1	0.4; 2	0.8; 2	0.4; 2	0.2; 1	0.1; 1	3.6
ElectoPanel/Electomanía	30–31 Oct	1,730	?	26.9; 114	20.0; 83	17.6; 64	11.6; 31	7.4; 12	3.3; 13	2.3; 3	2.7; 11	1.4; 6	1.3; 5	0.7; 1	0.5; 1	0.7; 2	0.4; 2	0.2; 1	0.1; 1	6.9
InvyMark/laSexta	26–30 Oct	?	?	28.5	23.2	14.7	11.0	7.3	–	–	–	–	–	–	–	–	–	–	–	5.3
DYM/Henneo	22–23 Oct	1,006	?	25.0; 105/109	24.5; 107/111	16.6; 56/60	10.3; 25/27	7.8; 13/16	–	–	–	–	–	–	–	–	–	–	–	0.5
Sigma Dos/El Mundo	22–23 Oct	1,000	?	29.3	24.0	14.9	11.8	6.8	3.0	1.0	2.0	1.9	–	–	–	–	–	–	–	5.3
Hamalgama Métrica/Okdiario	21–23 Oct	1,000	?	26.9; 109	23.1; 98	15.7; 58	12.6; 33	6.1; 8	3.6; 13	? 3	? 8	? 6	? 5	? 1	? 2	? 2	0.4; 2	? 1	? 1	3.8
ElectoPanel/Electomanía	19–22 Oct	4,772	?	27.0; 115	20.2; 85	17.4; 63	11.6; 31	7.5; 12	3.3; 13	2.3; 2	2.6; 10	1.4; 6	1.3; 5	0.7; 1	0.5; 1	0.6; 2	0.4; 2	0.2; 1	0.1; 1	6.8
KeyData/Público	20 Oct	?	66.6	27.4; 117	22.4; 94	15.5; 55	11.5; 29	6.9; 11	3.5; 13	1.9; 2	2.3; 10	1.6; 6	1.1; 5	0.9; 1	0.5; 2	? 1	? 2	? 1	? 1	5.0
SocioMétrica/El Español	15–17 Oct	2,103	?	26.6; 111	22.8; 99	16.3; 58	10.5; 25	7.1; 11	3.2; 12	2.5; 3	3.0; 12	1.8; 7	1.3; 5	–	0.4; 1	0.7; 2	0.4; 2	0.3; 1	0.1; 1	3.8
NC Report/La Razón	13–17 Oct	1,000	62.6	27.0; 114/115	23.6; 98/99	15.6; 53/54	11.4; 27/28	6.3; 9/10	3.4; 12/13	–	2.6; 9/10	1.5; 6	1.2; 5	–	–	–	–	–	–	3.4
ElectoPanel/Electomanía	12–16 Oct	1,450	?	27.0; 116	20.4; 85	17.0; 60	11.6; 31	7.7; 14	3.3; 13	2.3; 2	2.7; 10	1.5; 6	1.3; 5	0.7; 1	0.5; 1	0.7; 2	0.4; 2	0.2; 1	0.1; 1	6.6
Metroscopia	15 Oct	?	?	28.5	22.4	18.0	10.8	5.2	–	2.0	–	–	–	–	–	–	–	–	–	6.1
GIPEyOP	23 Sep–14 Oct	1,955	59.4	21.0	17.4	19.7	14.7	5.5	3.7	4.1	3.1	1.8	1.6	2.1	0.5	1.1	0.1	–	–	1.3
Sigma Dos/Antena 3	10 Oct	?	?	28.1	24.1	14.0	12.4	7.2	3.2	0.9	1.7	1.9	–	–	–	–	–	–	–	4.0
InvyMark/laSexta	5–9 Oct	?	?	28.8	22.7	15.1	11.1	7.4	–	–	–	–	–	–	–	–	–	–	–	6.1
ElectoPanel/Electomanía	5–9 Oct	1,265	?	27.1; 117	20.7; 87	16.7; 59	11.5; 29	7.9; 14	3.3; 13	2.2; 2	2.7; 10	1.4; 6	1.2; 5	0.7; 1	0.5; 1	0.6; 2	0.4; 2	0.2; 1	0.1; 1	6.4
Simple Lógica	1–9 Oct	1,060	63.6	27.2	19.5	17.1	11.0	7.5	–	–	–	–	–	–	–	–	–	–	–	7.7
CIS (SocioMétrica)	1–7 Oct	2,924	62.5	30.6	20.0	15.9	11.1	6.6	2.8	2.1	1.7	1.6	1.3	0.7	0.2	0.4	0.5	0.1	0.2	10.6
CIS	1–7 Oct	2,924	?	30.8	18.9	12.5	11.7	8.8	3.3	1.8	1.8	1.3	1.1	0.5	0.2	0.5	0.4	0.2	0.1	11.9
ElectoPanel/Electomanía	1–3 Oct	1,265	?	27.1; 117	20.7; 88	16.4; 59	11.4; 28	8.3; 14	3.4; 13	2.2; 2	2.6; 10	1.4; 6	1.2; 5	0.7; 1	0.5; 1	0.6; 2	0.4; 2	0.2; 1	0.1; 1	6.4
GAD3/ABC	28 Sep–2 Oct	960	?	27.3; 118	23.8; 103	14.6; 46	11.3; 29	5.8; 9	3.5; 15	1.5; 2	1.9; 8	1.9; 7	1.2; 5	0.8; 1	0.4; 1	0.8; 2	0.4; 2	0.3; 1	0.1; 1	3.5
ElectoPanel/Electomanía	22–25 Sep	1,410	?	27.4; 118	20.2; 88	16.9; 60	10.9; 26	8.4; 14	3.4; 13	2.3; 2	2.7; 10	1.4; 6	1.2; 5	0.7; 1	0.5; 1	0.6; 2	0.4; 2	0.2; 1	0.1; 1	7.2
InvyMark/laSexta	21–25 Sep	?	?	29.1	21.8	14.6	11.6	7.7	–	–	–	–	–	–	–	–	–	–	–	7.3
DYM/Henneo	16–20 Sep	1,008	?	25.8; 109/111	24.0; 105/108	13.7; 44/47	10.8; 27/30	8.8; 15/18	–	–	–	–	–	–	–	–	–	–	–	1.8
Demoscopia y Servicios/ESdiario	17–19 Sep	1,000	?	25.7; 108	23.5; 101	15.3; 54	13.2; 34	6.5; 9	3.1; 11	1.6; 2	2.7; 10	1.5; 6	1.4; 6	0.9; 2	0.4; 1	0.6; 2	0.4; 2	0.3; 1	0.1; 1	2.2
ElectoPanel/Electomanía	16–19 Sep	1,632	?	27.3; 119	20.1; 87	16.6; 59	11.1; 27	8.7; 14	3.4; 13	2.2; 2	2.6; 10	1.5; 6	1.2; 5	0.7; 1	0.5; 1	0.7; 2	0.4; 2	0.2; 1	0.1; 1	7.2
NC Report/La Razón	15–19 Sep	1,000	62.4	26.8; 115/116	24.1; 100/101	15.2; 52/53	11.3; 27/28	6.3; 9/10	3.4; 12/13	2.4; 2/3	2.6; 9/10	1.5; 6	1.2; 5	? 1/2	? 2	? 2	0.4; 2	? 1	? 1	2.7
KeyData/Público	18 Sep	?	67.2	27.7; 118	22.8; 98	14.7; 47	11.4; 31	7.7; 13	3.6; 13	1.9; 2	2.3; 9	1.6; 6	1.2; 5	0.9; 1	0.5; 2	? 1	? 2	? 1	? 1	4.9
Metroscopia	17 Sep	?	59	28.3; 121	21.0; 88	17.5; 64	10.2; 25	5.7; 8	2.7; 9	–	–	–	–	–	–	–	0.4; 2	–	–	7.3
InvyMark/laSexta	7–11 Sep	?	?	28.6	22.4	14.5	11.3	7.3	–	–	–	–	–	–	–	–	–	–	–	6.2
ElectoPanel/Electomanía	7–11 Sep	1,227	?	27.0; 118	20.3; 87	16.6; 59	11.1; 27	8.6; 14	3.4; 13	2.2; 2	2.7; 11	1.3; 6	1.2; 5	0.7; 1	0.5; 1	0.6; 2	0.4; 2	0.2; 1	0.1; 1	6.7
Simple Lógica	1–11 Sep	1,065	63.4	28.1	22.1	15.8	12.3	6.1	–	–	–	–	–	–	–	–	–	–	–	6.0
CIS (SocioMétrica)	1–7 Sep	2,904	61.8	28.5	19.1	15.0	12.3	9.7	2.5	1.6	1.5	1.5	0.9	0.6	0.3	0.9	0.4	0.1	–	9.4
CIS	1–7 Sep	2,904	?	31.5	18.1	11.7	12.2	10.6	2.8	1.5	1.7	1.2	0.8	0.6	0.6	0.8	0.5	0.2	–	13.4
Sigma Dos/Antena 3	6 Sep	?	?	28.9	25.3	13.5	12.1	6.2	3.3	0.9	1.6	1.9	–	–	–	–	–	–	–	3.6
ElectoPanel/Electomanía	30 Aug–3 Sep	1,240	?	27.5; 119	20.8; 89	16.4; 59	10.6; 25	8.2; 14	3.4; 13	2.3; 2	2.7; 10	1.4; 6	1.2; 5	0.7; 1	0.5; 1	0.7; 2	0.4; 2	0.2; 1	0.1; 1	6.7
SocioMétrica/El Español	28–30 Aug	1,620	?	27.3; 118	24.1; 104	14.3; 45	9.6; 22	8.7; 15	3.4; 13	2.3; 3	2.7; 10	1.7; 7	1.3; 5	0.8; 1	0.6; 2	0.6; 1	0.4; 2	0.2; 1	0.1; 1	3.2
NC Report/La Razón	25–29 Aug	1,000	62.1	26.9; 113/115	24.7; 105/107	15.0; 49/51	10.7; 26/27	5.7; 8/9	3.5; 12/13	2.4; 2/3	2.5; 8/9	1.5; 6/7	1.3; 5	? 2	? 2	? 2	? 2	? 1	? 1	2.2
ElectoPanel/Electomanía	23–27 Aug	1,430	?	27.4; 119	21.4; 90	15.8; 56	11.5; 28	7.5; 13	3.5; 13	2.1; 2	2.7; 10	1.4; 6	1.2; 5	0.7; 1	0.5; 1	0.7; 2	0.4; 2	0.2; 1	0.1; 1	6.0
SW Demoscopia	19–21 Aug	1,001	?	28.7; 121/126	20.2; 85/90	15.9; 51/56	11.4; 29/32	9.5; 13/17	3.6; 12/14	1.2 ?	2.5 ?	1.5 ?	1.3 ?	–	–	–	–	–	–	8.5
ElectoPanel/Electomanía	18–21 Aug	1,520	?	27.2; 118	22.1; 94	15.3; 52	11.2; 28	7.4; 13	3.5; 13	2.1; 2	2.8; 11	1.3; 6	1.2; 5	0.7; 1	0.5; 1	0.7; 2	0.4; 2	0.2; 1	0.1; 1	5.1
ElectoPanel/Electomanía	10–13 Aug	1,802	?	26.7; 116	22.9; 101	14.7; 48	11.5; 29	7.2; 11	3.6; 13	2.1; 2	2.9; 11	1.3; 6	1.3; 5	0.7; 1	0.5; 1	0.7; 2	0.4; 2	0.2; 1	0.1; 1	3.8
Simple Lógica	3–6 Aug	1,046	65.1	29.2	22.9	13.5	11.4	6.3	–	–	–	–	–	–	–	–	–	–	–	6.3
ElectoPanel/Electomanía	3–6 Aug	2,150	?	26.8; 115	23.0; 101	14.1; 45	11.6; 30	7.7; 14	3.8; 13	2.1; 2	3.0; 11	1.3; 6	1.3; 5	0.6; 1	0.5; 1	0.7; 2	0.4; 2	0.2; 1	0.1; 1	3.8
ElectoPanel/Electomanía	3–4 Aug	1,530	?	27.5; 118	23.1; 101	14.1; 45	10.6; 26	7.9; 14	3.7; 14	2.1; 2	2.8; 11	1.4; 6	1.3; 5	0.6; 1	0.5; 1	0.7; 2	0.4; 2	0.2; 1	0.1; 1	4.4
Celeste-Tel/eldiario.es	27–31 Jul	1,100	64.1	28.7; 121	24.4; 101	14.6; 47	11.9; 29	5.3; 7	3.5; 13	2.2; 3	2.2; 8	1.6; 6	1.2; 5	1.0; 2	0.6; 2	0.9; 2	0.4; 2	0.2; 1	0.1; 1	4.3
ElectoPanel/Electomanía	25–31 Jul	1,700	?	28.9; 126	23.0; 100	14.2; 45	10.0; 22	7.7; 13	3.7; 14	1.9; 2	2.4; 9	1.4; 6	1.3; 5	0.6; 1	0.5; 1	0.7; 2	0.4; 2	0.2; 1	0.1; 1	5.9
Metroscopia	26 Jul	?	?	29.7	24.8	13.0	10.7	5.3	–	1.3	–	–	–	–	–	–	–	–	–	4.9
InvyMark/laSexta	20–24 Jul	?	?	29.1	21.4	14.0	11.9	7.9	–	–	–	–	–	–	–	–	–	–	–	7.7
ElectoPanel/Electomanía	20–24 Jul	1,500	?	29.1; 126	22.7; 99	14.1; 45	9.9; 22	7.9; 14	3.8; 14	2.0; 2	2.4; 9	1.4; 6	1.3; 5	0.6; 1	0.5; 1	0.7; 2	0.4; 2	0.2; 1	0.1; 1	6.4
CIS	9–19 Jul	2,926	?	32.4	19.4	12.3	12.6	8.7	2.8	1.6	1.3	1.0	1.0	0.5	0.5	0.8	0.4	0.3	0.0	13.0
NC Report/La Razón	14–18 Jul	1,000	62.2	26.4; 110/112	25.2; 108/110	14.9; 49/51	10.7; 26/27	5.5; 7/8	3.6; 13/14	2.1; 2	2.4; 8/9	1.6; 6/7	1.3; 5	? 1	? 2	? 2	0.4; 2	? 1	? 1	1.2
KeyData/Público	17 Jul	?	68.0	27.7; 119	23.7; 101	12.9; 44	12.4; 33	7.2; 10	3.6; 13	1.9; 2	2.3; 9	1.7; 6	1.2; 5	0.9; 1	0.5; 2	? 1	? 2	? 1	? 1	4.0
ElectoPanel/Electomanía	12–17 Jul	1,500	?	27.5; 120	23.4; 101	14.5; 46	10.3; 25	7.5; 13	3.6; 13	2.1; 2	2.7; 10	1.4; 6	1.3; 5	0.7; 1	0.5; 2	0.7; 2	0.4; 2	0.2; 1	0.1; 1	4.1
GAD3/ABC	6–14 Jul	2,300	?	29.1; 117	27.6; 121	11.2; 33	10.1; 25	5.2; 6	? 15	1.8; 2	? 8	? 7	? 5	? 1	? 2	? 4	? 2	? 1	? 1	1.5
ElectoPanel/Electomanía	3–10 Jul	3,700	?	26.6; 115	22.9; 100	15.0; 49	11.2; 28	8.6; 14	3.7; 13	1.9; 2	2.8; 11	1.4; 6	1.2; 5	0.7; 1	0.5; 1	0.5; 1	0.3; 2	0.2; 1	0.1; 1	3.7
IMOP/CIS	1–9 Jul	3,032	?	32.1	21.2	11.6	12.1	8.8	2.7	0.9	1.5	1.3	0.8	0.6	0.4	0.7	0.4	0.1	0.0	10.9
Simple Lógica	1–8 Jul	1,035	64.1	29.1	21.8	15.0	12.5	6.4	–	–	–	–	–	–	–	–	–	–	–	7.3
ElectoPanel/Electomanía	29 Jun–2 Jul	3,100	?	26.3; 113	23.5; 102	14.6; 46	11.9; 30	8.5; 14	3.5; 13	1.9; 2	2.6; 11	1.3; 6	1.2; 5	0.8; 1	0.5; 2	0.5; 1	0.4; 2	0.2; 1	0.1; 1	2.8
DYM/Henneo	24–27 Jun	1,000	?	26.0; 110/113	22.4; 98/101	15.1; 49/52	11.3; 29/32	8.3; 14/17	–	–	–	–	–	–	–	–	–	–	–	3.6
GESOP	22–26 Jun	750	?	28.5; 123	23.5; 103	13.0; 40	13.5; 38	6.0; 7	3.0; 12	–	2.0; 8	–	–	–	–	–	–	–	–	5.0
InvyMark/laSexta	22–26 Jun	?	?	27.8	21.0	14.1	12.8	8.7	–	–	–	–	–	–	–	–	–	–	–	6.8
ElectoPanel/Electomanía	22–26 Jun	3,220	?	26.3; 111	24.2; 106	14.2; 45	11.7; 29	8.0; 14	3.5; 13	2.0; 2	2.6; 11	1.3; 6	1.2; 5	0.8; 1	0.5; 2	0.5; 1	0.4; 2	0.2; 1	0.1; 1	2.1
Demoscopia y Servicios/ESdiario	17–19 Jun	1,000	?	25.0; 102	24.2; 108	15.1; 50	13.7; 37	6.2; 8	3.1; 11	1.5; 2	2.8; 11	1.5; 6	1.4; 6	1.0; 2	0.4; 1	0.6; 2	0.4; 2	0.3; 1	0.1; 1	0.8
ElectoPanel/Electomanía	13–19 Jun	3,530	?	25.5; 106	24.6; 110	14.2; 45	11.8; 30	8.2; 14	3.6; 13	1.9; 2	2.6; 11	1.3; 6	1.2; 5	0.8; 1	0.5; 2	0.5; 1	0.4; 2	0.2; 1	0.1; 1	0.9
Sigma Dos/El Mundo	15–17 Jun	1,000	?	28.7	26.0	11.7	12.0	8.3	3.1	1.2	2.0	1.9	–	–	–	–	–	–	–	2.7
Metroscopia	15 Jun	?	?	29.4	22.8	14.3	11.9	6.7	–	–	–	–	–	–	–	–	–	–	–	6.6
NC Report/La Razón	9–13 Jun	1,000	61.7	26.0; 109/111	25.1; 109/111	14.8; 47/49	12.1; 29/31	5.6; 7/9	3.7; 13/14	1.9; 2	2.4; 8/9	1.6; 6/7	1.3; 5	1.0; 2	0.5; 2	0.5; 1	0.4; 2	0.3; 1	0.1; 1	0.9
ElectoPanel/Electomanía	6–12 Jun	2,000	?	25.9; 109	24.7; 110	14.1; 44	11.7; 29	7.9; 14	3.6; 13	2.0; 2	2.6; 10	1.3; 6	1.2; 5	0.8; 1	0.5; 2	0.5; 1	0.4; 2	0.2; 1	0.1; 1	1.2
CIS (SocioMétrica)	1–9 Jun	4,258	65.1	31.2	21.8	13.0	11.4	9.0	2.4	2.0	1.3	1.4	0.9	0.8	0.4	0.5	0.2	0.1	–	9.4
IMOP/CIS	1–9 Jun	4,258	?	31.2	20.0	12.5	11.4	9.4	2.6	1.3	1.2	1.4	0.9	0.7	0.4	0.6	0.3	0.1	0.0	11.2
Simple Lógica	1–5 Jun	1,012	62.7	29.9	21.7	15.1	12.0	7.6	–	–	–	–	–	–	–	–	–	–	–	8.2
Celeste-Tel/eldiario.es	1–5 Jun	1,100	61.9	27.0; 113	23.1; 100	15.2; 52	12.3; 32	6.7; 11	3.8; 13	1.8; 2	2.4; 8	1.6; 6	1.2; 5	0.9; 1	0.5; 2	0.5; 1	0.4; 2	0.3; 1	0.1; 1	3.9
GAD3/ABC	18 May–5 Jun	3,104	?	28.3; 121	25.4; 111	11.2; 33	10.5; 27	7.6; 13	? 14	1.6; 2	? 9	? 6	? 5	? 1	? 2	? 2	? 2	? 1	? 1	2.9
ElectoPanel/Electomanía	2–3 Jun	1,400	?	25.6; 107	25.1; 111	14.0; 44	11.7; 29	7.8; 14	3.6; 13	1.9; 2	2.6; 11	1.3; 6	1.2; 5	0.8; 1	0.5; 2	0.5; 1	0.4; 2	0.2; 1	0.1; 1	0.5
ElectoPanel/Electomanía	29–31 May	2,200	?	26.2; 107	25.6; 113	13.8; 43	11.5; 29	7.2; 13	3.6; 13	1.8; 2	2.7; 11	1.2; 6	1.2; 5	0.8; 1	0.5; 2	0.5; 1	0.4; 2	0.2; 1	0.1; 1	0.6
SocioMétrica/El Español	27–29 May	1,872	?	26.9; 113	24.4; 108	14.6; 47	10.9; 27	7.9; 14	3.6; 14	1.4; 0	2.3; 9	1.6; 6	1.0; 5	0.7; 1	0.6; 2	–	0.4; 2	0.3; 1	0.1; 1	2.5
InvyMark/laSexta	25–29 May	?	?	26.9	20.0	15.5	13.2	8.6	–	–	–	–	–	–	–	–	–	–	–	6.9
DYM/Henneo	21–24 May	1,041	?	25.1; 108/112	22.0; 97/100	15.8; 52/54	11.3; 29/32	9.0; 16/18	–	–	–	–	–	–	–	–	–	–	–	3.1
ElectoPanel/Electomanía	18–23 May	4,500	?	26.4; 109	25.4; 111	13.9; 45	11.5; 29	7.2; 11	3.4; 13	1.9; 2	2.7; 11	1.4; 6	1.1; 5	0.8; 1	0.5; 2	0.5; 1	0.4; 2	0.2; 1	0.1; 1	1.0
KeyData/Público	17 May	?	65.3	27.8; 119	23.3; 100	14.1; 46	12.1; 33	6.8; 9	3.5; 13	1.6; 2	2.2; 8	1.6; 6	1.1; 5	1.0; 2	0.5; 2	? 1	? 2	? 1	? 1	4.5
Sigma Dos/Antena 3	17 May	?	?	29.7	26.4	11.8	11.4	6.0	3.6	1.0	1.9	1.9	–	–	–	–	–	–	–	3.3
NC Report/La Razón	12–16 May	1,000	62.1	26.0; 108/110	24.9; 107/109	14.6; 49/51	12.5; 31/33	5.2; 6/8	3.6; 13/14	–	2.6; 8/9	1.7; 6/7	1.2; 5	–	–	–	–	–	–	1.1
Hamalgama Métrica/Okdiario	12–15 May	1,000	?	26.1; 110	25.4; 109	15.3; 52	11.6; 31	4.0; 4	3.7; 14	1.5; 3	2.4; 8	1.6; 6	1.2; 5	? 1	? 2	? 1	0.4; 2	? 1	? 1	0.7
GESOP/El Periódico	11–15 May	750	?	27.5; 118/121	22.8; 99/102	14.0; 45/48	11.3; 29/32	6.5; 9/10	3.4; 12/13	–	2.1; 8	1.8; 7	1.2; 5	–	–	–	–	–	–	4.7
SW Demoscopia/Grupo Viva	8–15 May	2,000	?	28.1; 118/121	21.2; 89/93	15.8; 51/54	11.8; 31/34	8.9; 12/16	3.7; 12/14	1.5 ?	2.4 ?	1.5 ?	0.9 ?	0.8 ?	0.4 ?	–	0.4 ?	0.2 ?	–	6.9
GIPEyOP	28 Apr–14 May	8,387	64.9	27.3; 117	21.2; 86	15.8; 56	13.0; 36	5.6; 8	3.8; 14	2.3; 3	1.8; 7	1.5; 6	1.5; 6	1.4; 4	0.7; 2	0.9; 2	0.6; 2	–	–	6.1
Metroscopia	11–13 May	?	?	28.3	24.0	13.1	11.2	6.8	–	–	–	–	–	–	–	–	–	–	–	4.3
ElectoPanel/Electomanía	11–13 May	1,738	?	26.1; 108	25.3; 111	14.1; 44	11.4; 29	7.4; 13	3.3; 13	1.8; 2	2.7; 11	1.3; 6	1.2; 5	0.8; 1	0.5; 2	0.6; 1	0.4; 2	0.3; 1	0.1; 1	0.8
CIS (SocioMétrica)	4–13 May	3,800	68.1	29.8	22.3	11.8	12.0	9.9	2.7	2.0	1.3	1.3	0.7	0.8	0.4	0.5	0.4	0.3	0.1	7.5
Intercampo/CIS	4–13 May	3,800	?	31.1	20.3	11.3	11.5	10.5	2.9	1.4	1.2	1.3	0.7	0.7	0.4	0.5	0.3	0.2	0.1	10.8
Demoscopia y Servicios/ESdiario	7–9 May	1,200	?	25.1; 104	23.9; 106	15.2; 52	13.6; 38	6.4; 8	3.2; 11	1.4; 2	2.7; 10	1.5; 6	1.3; 5	1.2; 2	0.4; 1	0.5; 1	0.4; 2	0.3; 1	0.1; 1	1.2
SW Demoscopia	5–8 May	1,104	?	28.4; 118/123	20.3; 84/89	16.2; 53/58	12.0; 31/35	9.0; 12/16	3.5; 11/14	1.2 ?	2.3 ?	1.5 ?	0.9 ?	0.8 ?	0.4 ?	–	0.4 ?	0.2 ?	–	8.1
Celeste-Tel/eldiario.es	4–8 May	1,100	62.3	27.4; 116	22.2; 95	15.6; 54	12.9; 34	6.5; 9	3.7; 13	1.6; 2	2.5; 8	1.6; 6	1.2; 5	0.8; 1	0.4; 2	0.5; 1	0.4; 2	0.3; 1	0.1; 1	5.2
Simple Lógica	4–8 May	1,019	63.8	30.8	21.7	11.8	12.2	9.8	–	–	–	–	–	–	–	–	–	–	–	9.1
GAD3/ABC	4–8 May	1,004	66	28.7; 120	27.1; 115	11.7; 35	10.9; 28	5.9; 8	? 13	1.4; 2	? 7	? 6	? 5	? 3	? 1	? 3	? 2	? 1	? 1	1.6
ElectoPanel/Electomanía	2–7 May	4,753	?	26.3; 109	24.9; 109	14.1; 44	11.4; 28	7.6; 14	3.3; 13	1.8; 2	2.7; 11	1.3; 6	1.2; 5	0.8; 1	0.5; 2	0.6; 1	0.4; 2	0.3; 1	0.1; 1	1.4
Sináptica/Público	28 Apr–4 May	1,001	?	25.1	22.3	15.7	13.1	7.5	3.3	2.2	2.6	1.2	1.6	1.3	–	–	–	–	–	2.8
InvyMark/laSexta	27 Apr–1 May	?	?	27.9	20.4	17.0	12.3	6.9	–	–	–	–	–	–	–	–	–	–	–	7.5
NC Report/La Razón	27–30 Apr	1,000	62.5	26.3; 112/114	23.2; 97/99	15.4; 51/53	13.0; 33/35	6.2; 8/9	3.5; 12/13	1.7; 1/2	2.7; 9/10	1.6; 6	1.1; 5	0.9; 2	0.5; 2	0.5; 1	0.4; 2	0.3; 1	0.1; 1	3.1
ElectoPanel/Electomanía	26–29 Apr	1,480	?	27.4; 119	23.8; 102	14.2; 45	11.4; 28	7.3; 12	3.4; 13	1.8; 2	2.7; 10	1.4; 6	1.2; 5	0.9; 1	0.5; 2	0.6; 1	0.4; 2	0.3; 1	0.1; 1	3.6
DYM/Henneo	23–25 Apr	1,000	?	25.1; 108/112	22.4; 99/103	15.3; 51/53	12.1; 32/34	7.8; 12/14	–	2.3; 3	–	–	–	–	–	–	–	–	–	2.7
SocioMétrica/El Español	21–24 Apr	1,200	?	28.2; 116	25.4; 107	14.5; 49	11.0; 27	7.5; 12	3.2; 13	1.2; 0	2.4; 9	1.5; 6	1.0; 5	0.7; 1	0.3; 1	0.4; 1	0.3; 1	0.3; 1	0.1; 1	2.8
Metroscopia	20–24 Apr	?	?	26.7	25.1	13.6	12.0	5.6	–	–	–	–	–	–	–	–	–	–	–	1.6
ElectoPanel/Electomanía	20–22 Apr	1,500	?	28.3; 123	23.7; 101	13.8; 44	11.6; 29	7.1; 10	3.6; 13	1.7; 2	2.4; 9	1.3; 6	1.2; 5	0.9; 1	0.5; 2	0.6; 1	0.4; 2	0.3; 1	0.1; 1	4.6
KeyData/Público	17 Apr	?	69.3	28.2; 124	22.3; 95	14.5; 47	12.4; 33	6.4; 9	3.4; 13	1.9; 2	2.0; 7	1.5; 6	1.0; 5	1.0; 2	0.4; 2	? 1	? 2	? 1	? 1	5.9
Hamalgama Métrica/Okdiario	14–17 Apr	1,000	63.4	26.8; 112	22.7; 100	15.0; 51	13.4; 37	5.3; 7	3.6; 13	1.6; 3	2.5; 8	1.6; 6	1.2; 5	? 1	? 2	? 1	? 2	? 1	? 1	4.1
Sigma Dos/El Mundo	13–15 Apr	1,000	?	31.7	25.4	11.9	11.5	5.4	3.6	1.3	1.9	1.9	–	–	–	–	–	–	–	6.3
ElectoPanel/Electomanía	8–14 Apr	3,500	?	28.1; 123	23.6; 101	13.9; 43	11.5; 27	7.5; 13	3.6; 13	1.8; 2	2.4; 9	1.3; 6	1.1; 5	0.9; 1	0.5; 2	0.6; 1	0.4; 2	0.3; 1	0.1; 1	4.5
ElectoPanel/Electomanía	2–7 Apr	2,115	?	25.9; 113	23.5; 103	14.3; 46	11.9; 30	8.3; 14	3.7; 13	1.9; 2	2.5; 9	1.4; 6	1.2; 5	0.9; 2	0.6; 2	0.6; 1	0.4; 2	0.3; 1	0.1; 1	2.4
Simple Lógica	1–7 Apr	1,057	64.5	28.2	22.2	16.0	11.0	5.7	–	–	–	–	–	–	–	–	–	–	–	6.0
Celeste-Tel/eldiario.es	1–7 Apr	1,100	62.6	27.9; 118	20.5; 85	16.3; 58	13.7; 37	6.9; 9	3.7; 13	1.7; 2	2.3; 8	1.5; 6	1.2; 5	1.0; 2	0.5; 2	0.5; 1	0.4; 2	0.3; 1	0.1; 1	7.4
CIS (SocioMétrica)	30 Mar–7 Apr	3,000	69.0	30.6	23.0	13.9	12.3	7.1	3.6	1.2	1.4	1.3	0.6	0.5	0.3	0.4	0.4	0.2	0.1	7.6
Intercampo/CIS	30 Mar–7 Apr	3,000	?	31.2	21.1	13.0	12.0	7.6	3.3	1.5	1.4	1.2	0.5	0.6	0.4	0.5	0.3	0.2	0.1	10.1
Sigma Dos/Antena 3	25 Mar–1 Apr	?	?	32.2	24.3	13.8	11.0	4.4	3.7	1.5	1.9	1.8	–	–	–	–	–	–	–	7.9
SW Demoscopia	27–31 Mar	1,102	?	25.5; 106/111	21.6; 93/98	16.9; 55/60	12.6; 30/35	5.1; 5/10	3.8 ?	2.3; 1/3	2.6 ?	1.7 ?	1.2 ?	0.9 ?	0.6 ?	–	0.5 ?	0.3 ?	–	3.9
KeyData/Público	30 Mar	?	69.3	27.9; 119	20.8; 87	16.0; 57	13.6; 37	6.2; 8	3.5; 13	2.0; 2	2.1; 8	1.6; 6	1.0; 5	1.0; 2	0.5; 2	? 0	? 2	? 1	? 1	7.1
ElectoPanel/Electomanía	26–30 Mar	2,500	?	25.2; 106	23.2; 104	14.2; 47	12.0; 32	8.9; 15	3.8; 13	2.0; 2	2.6; 10	1.3; 6	1.2; 5	0.9; 2	0.6; 2	0.7; 2	0.4; 2	0.2; 1	0.1; 1	2.0
DYM/Henneo	26–27 Mar	1,001	?	26.8	23.1	14.4	11.8	7.2	–	1.9	–	–	–	–	–	–	–	–	–	3.7
SyM Consulting/La Nueva Crónica	23–26 Mar	3,104	70.7	26.2; 115/118	19.9; 83/85	15.7; 62/65	11.8 (Note: The poll does not give data for the regional En Comú Podem and Galicia en Común alliances, awarding 8.7% and 14/16 seats to Unidas Podemos. For comparison viability purposes, results for the regional alliances are considered to remain the same as in the general election (3.1% and 9 seats).); 23/25	5.2; 6/9	4.0; 12/14	–	–	–	–	–	–	–	–	–	–	6.3
Demoscopia y Servicios/ESdiario	16–17 Mar	1,000	65.2	24.5; 101	23.4; 103	14.5; 52	13.6; 37	8.3; 13	3.0; 12	1.3; 1	2.8; 9	1.6; 7	1.2; 5	1.3; 3	0.5; 2	0.5; 2	0.4; 2	0.3; 1	0.1; 1	1.1
ElectoPanel/Electomanía	12–13 Mar	1,200	?	25.5; 109	21.7; 91	15.1; 54	13.4; 36	7.8; 13	3.8; 13	1.8; 2	2.7; 10	1.4; 6	1.2; 5	1.0; 2	0.5; 2	0.8; 2	0.4; 2	0.3; 1	0.1; 1	3.8
CIS	1–13 Mar	3,912	?	31.9	19.6	14.8	12.9	7.2	2.4	1.2	1.2	1.5	1.2	0.5	0.4	0.6	0.4	0.1	0.1	12.3
Simple Lógica	2–6 Mar	1,029	67.6	27.7	20.9	15.1	14.9	7.7	–	–	–	–	–	–	–	–	–	–	–	6.8
InvyMark/laSexta	2–6 Mar	?	?	28.8	21.1	17.6	13.2	3.3	–	–	–	–	–	–	–	–	–	–	–	7.7
SocioMétrica/El Español	5 Mar	?	?	27.9	21.0	16.4	12.3	5.6	–	–	–	–	–	–	–	–	–	–	–	6.9
KeyData/Público	5 Mar	?	71.2	27.7; 119	20.6; 87	16.0; 58	13.6; 37	6.0; 8	3.4; 12	1.9; 2	2.1; 9	1.6; 6	0.9; 5	0.9; 2	0.5; 2	? 0	? 2	? 1	? 1	7.1
ElectoPanel/Electomanía	1–5 Mar	1,250	?	27.7; 116	20.3; 86	17.0; 61	13.2; 36	5.5; 6	3.7; 14	1.9; 2	2.7; 10	1.4; 6	1.1; 5	0.9; 1	0.5; 2	0.5; 1	0.4; 2	0.3; 1	0.1; 1	7.4
SW Demoscopia	24–28 Feb	1,302	?	27.8; 116/120	19.7; 80/84	18.8; 68/72	13.2; 33/37	3.9; 3/6	3.6 ?	2.4; 2/3	2.3 ?	1.6 ?	1.1 ?	1.0 ?	0.6 ?	–	0.4 ?	0.3 ?	–	8.1
ElectoPanel/Electomanía	23–25 Feb	1,250	?	27.7; 118	20.4; 87	17.0; 60	13.3; 36	5.3; 4	3.6; 14	1.8; 2	2.7; 10	1.5; 6	1.1; 5	0.9; 1	0.5; 2	0.5; 1	0.4; 2	0.2; 1	0.1; 1	7.3
InvyMark/laSexta	17–21 Feb	?	?	29.1	21.0	17.0	13.4	3.5	–	–	–	–	–	–	–	–	–	–	–	8.1
Metroscopia	15 Feb	?	?	26.9	21.0	16.2	13.8	4.8	–	–	–	–	–	–	–	–	–	–	–	5.9
NC Report/La Razón	6–14 Feb	1,000	62.9	26.9; 114/116	22.2; 92/94	16.1; 54/56	13.2; 34/36	5.6; 8	3.4; 12/13	1.7; 2	2.9; 10/11	1.5; 6	1.1; 5	0.9; 2	0.5; 2	0.5; 1	0.5; 2	0.3; 1	0.1; 1	4.7
Simple Lógica	3–11 Feb	1,073	67.5	28.5	17.6	16.1	14.0	7.9	–	–	–	–	–	–	–	–	–	–	–	10.9
CIS (SocioMétrica)	1–11 Feb	2,957	65.1	28.2	19.9	14.2	14.0	8.2	3.6	2.3	2.0	1.4	1.2	1.0	0.2	0.5	0.3	0.1	0.1	8.3
CIS	1–11 Feb	2,957	?	30.9	18.9	13.4	13.6	8.1	3.3	1.6	1.8	1.3	1.1	1.0	0.2	0.7	0.3	0.1	0.1	12.0
Celeste-Tel/eldiario.es	3–7 Feb	1,100	63.8	27.6; 117	20.2; 86	16.9; 59	13.5; 36	6.2; 9	3.3; 12	2.0; 2	2.7; 9	1.5; 6	1.1; 5	1.0; 2	0.5; 2	0.5; 1	0.4; 2	0.3; 1	0.1; 1	7.4
ElectoPanel/Electomanía	3–5 Feb	1,490	?	27.2; 115	19.9; 86	16.8; 59	13.4; 36	6.1; 9	3.7; 14	1.8; 2	2.7; 10	1.5; 6	1.1; 5	0.9; 1	0.5; 2	0.5; 1	0.4; 2	0.2; 1	0.1; 1	7.3
ElectoPanel/Electomanía	30 Jan–1 Feb	1,250	?	26.7; 112	19.8; 86	16.9; 59	13.6; 37	6.8; 10	3.4; 13	1.8; 2	3.0; 12	1.5; 6	1.1; 5	0.8; 1	0.5; 2	0.5; 1	0.4; 2	0.2; 1	0.1; 1	6.9
InvyMark/laSexta	27–31 Jan	?	?	29.7	20.4	16.8	13.5	3.9	–	–	–	–	–	–	–	–	–	–	–	9.3
SW Demoscopia	27–31 Jan	1,307	?	27.0; 113/118	19.4; 78/83	18.7; 71/76	13.7; 35/39	4.7; 3/7	3.8 ?	2.2; 2/4	2.3 ?	1.6 ?	1.0 ?	1.1 ?	0.6 ?	–	0.4 ?	0.3 ?	–	7.6
Metroscopia	13–29 Jan	4,237	?	26.8	20.5	15.3	13.3	6.1	–	2.7	–	–	–	–	–	–	–	–	–	6.3
ElectoPanel/Electomanía	21–23 Jan	1,250	?	26.3; 111	19.4; 85	17.1; 61	13.7; 37	6.8; 10	3.7; 13	1.8; 2	2.7; 11	1.5; 7	1.2; 5	0.9; 1	0.5; 2	0.5; 1	0.4; 2	0.2; 1	0.1; 1	6.9
KeyData/Público	21 Jan	?	69.0	27.7; 118	21.0; 90	15.6; 57	14.0; 38	5.8; 7	3.4; 12	1.8; 2	2.3; 9	1.6; 6	1.1; 4	0.9; 1	0.6; 2	? 0	? 2	? 1	? 1	6.7
SocioMétrica/El Español	15–18 Jan	1,100	?	27.7; 118	21.2; 87	16.3; 60	12.5; 32	5.5; 6	3.6 ?	2.1; 1	2.2 ?	1.6 ?	1.1 ?	1.0 ?	0.5 ?	0.5 ?	0.4 ?	0.3 ?	0.1 ?	6.5
InvyMark/laSexta	13–17 Jan	?	?	30.3	20.2	16.6	13.6	3.8	–	–	–	–	–	–	–	–	–	–	–	10.1
NC Report/La Razón	7–17 Jan	1,000	63.5	26.7; 114/116	22.1; 93/95	16.1; 54/57	13.4; 35/37	5.4; 6/7	3.3; 12/13	1.8; 3	2.6; 8/9	1.5; 6	1.0; 5	1.1; 2	0.5; 2	0.5; 1	0.5; 2	0.3; 1	0.1; 1	4.6
ElectoPanel/Electomanía	13–15 Jan	2,500	?	26.4; 113	19.1; 81	16.9; 60	14.0; 38	7.2; 12	3.7; 13	1.8; 2	2.7; 10	1.5; 7	1.2; 5	0.8; 1	0.5; 2	0.5; 1	0.4; 2	0.2; 1	0.1; 1	7.3
CIS (Kiko Llaneras)	2–13 Jan	2,929	?	28.0	22.0	14.5	12.5	7.0	–	2.0	–	–	–	–	–	–	–	–	–	6.0
CIS (SocioMétrica)	2–13 Jan	2,929	66.5	27.4	21.7	14.4	13.1	7.1	3.5	1.5	1.8	1.6	1.3	1.0	0.4	0.4	0.1	0.0	0.1	5.7
CIS	2–13 Jan	2,929	?	30.4	19.9	13.4	13.8	6.5	3.9	1.8	1.4	1.6	1.3	1.0	0.3	0.5	0.1	–	0.1	10.5
Simple Lógica	7–10 Jan	1,097	66.4	26.5	20.3	14.4	15.5	7.9	–	–	–	–	–	–	–	–	–	–	–	6.2
InvyMark/laSexta	7–10 Jan	?	?	29.9	20.7	16.4	13.3	4.0	–	1.9	–	–	–	–	–	–	–	–	–	9.2
GAD3/ABC	7–10 Jan	1,000	?	26.3; 109	23.2; 103	15.0; 51	12.4; 32	7.3; 12	? 13	1.5; 3	? 9	? 6	? 4	? 2	? 1	? 1	? 2	? 1	? 1	3.1
Celeste-Tel/eldiario.es	2–9 Jan	1,100	64.1	27.0; 115	20.3; 87	16.4; 57	13.9; 38	6.1; 9	3.2; 12	2.0; 3	2.8; 9	1.4; 6	1.1; 5	1.3; 2	0.5; 2	0.5; 1	0.4; 2	0.3; 1	0.1; 1	6.7
ElectoPanel/Electomanía	7–8 Jan	1,250	?	26.6; 112	19.1; 81	17.1; 62	14.0; 39	6.8; 10	3.6; 13	1.8; 2	2.7; 10	1.5; 7	1.2; 5	0.8; 1	0.5; 2	0.5; 1	0.4; 2	0.2; 1	0.1; 1	7.5
SW Demoscopia	30 Dec–2 Jan	1,304	?	26.9; 113/118	19.5; 80/84	18.6; 71/76	13.3; 34/37	4.9; 3/8	3.7 ?	2.6; 2/4	2.2 ?	1.6 ?	1.1 ?	1.0 ?	0.6 ?	–	0.4 ?	0.3 ?	–	7.4
ElectoPanel/Electomanía	29 Dec–2 Jan	1,250	?	26.8; 114	19.9; 83	16.7; 59	14.2; 39	6.6; 10	3.4; 13	1.8; 2	2.6; 9	1.6; 7	1.2; 5	0.9; 1	0.5; 2	0.5; 1	0.4; 2	0.3; 1	0.1; 1	6.9

=== 2019 ===
Polling firm/Commissioner	Fieldwork date	Sample size	Turnout	PSOE	PP	Vox	Unidas Podemos	Cs	ERC–Sobiranistes	Más País	JxCat	PNV	EH Bildu	CUP	CC–NCa	BNG	NA+	PRC	TE	Lead
ElectoPanel/Electomanía	25–28 Dec	1,250	?	26.6; 114	20.4; 86	16.2; 58	13.7; 38	6.8; 10	3.3; 13	1.6; 2	2.6; 9	1.6; 7	1.2; 5	0.8; 1	0.5; 2	0.5; 1	0.4; 2	0.3; 1	0.1; 1	6.2
Sigma Dos/El Mundo	26–27 Dec	1,000	?	27.5	20.1	16.0	15.4	4.8	3.5	2.3	2.0	1.6	–	–	–	–	–	–	–	7.4
KeyData/Público	23 Dec	?	74.3	26.4; 118	20.4; 91	15.0; 53	12.8; 37	6.0; 8	3.4; 14	1.8; 3	1.9; 7	1.5; 6	1.1; 5	? 1	0.5; 2	? 1	? 2	? 1	? 1	6.0
SocioMétrica/El Español	20–21 Dec	2,160	?	27.2; 115	21.6; 91	16.2; 59	12.6; 34	5.8; 7	3.8; 14	2.0; 1	2.6; 10	1.8; 7	1.1; 5	0.9; 1	0.6; 1	0.5; 1	0.3; 1	0.3; 1	0.1; 1	5.6
ElectoPanel/Electomanía	17–19 Dec	1,250	?	26.7; 114	20.1; 83	16.6; 59	13.4; 37	7.3; 12	3.3; 13	1.9; 2	2.6; 9	1.6; 7	1.2; 5	0.8; 1	0.5; 2	0.5; 1	0.4; 2	0.3; 1	0.1; 1	6.6
CIS	29 Nov–19 Dec	4,800	?	28.3	20.0	15.2	12.8	5.6	3.6	2.3	2.2	1.6	1.1	1.0	0.5	0.5	0.4	0.3	0.1	8.3
Metroscopia	15 Dec	?	?	27.3	22.5	16.3	13.3	6.1	–	–	–	–	–	–	–	–	–	–	–	4.8
NC Report/La Razón	10–13 Dec	1,000	64.9	27.1; 116/118	21.6; 90/93	15.6; 52/54	13.1; 35/36	5.8; 7/8	3.5; 12/13	2.0; 3	2.3; 8/9	1.5; 6	1.1; 5	1.1; 2	0.5; 2	0.5; 1	0.5; 2	0.3; 1	0.1; 1	5.5
InvyMark/laSexta	9–13 Dec	?	?	28.8	21.6	16.4	13.7	3.9	–	1.9	–	–	–	–	–	–	–	–	–	7.2
ElectoPanel/Electomanía	10–12 Dec	1,250	?	26.6; 112	19.6; 83	16.6; 58	13.7; 38	7.6; 13	3.2; 13	1.8; 2	2.7; 10	1.6; 7	1.1; 5	0.7; 1	0.5; 2	0.5; 1	0.4; 2	0.3; 1	0.1; 1	7.0
Simple Lógica	2–12 Dec	1,064	64.9	27.0	20.5	13.8	16.4	6.4	–	–	–	–	–	–	–	–	–	–	–	6.5
ElectoPanel/Electomanía	3–5 Dec	1,250	?	26.8; 116	19.5; 84	16.5; 58	13.8; 37	7.1; 11	3.1; 11	1.7; 2	2.8; 11	1.6; 7	1.1; 5	0.7; 1	0.5; 2	0.5; 1	0.4; 2	0.3; 1	0.1; 1	7.3
ElectoPanel/Electomanía	21–27 Nov	1,250	?	26.3; 112	19.3; 83	16.7; 59	13.6; 38	7.7; 13	3.5; 13	2.1; 2	2.5; 8	1.6; 7	1.2; 5	0.9; 2	0.5; 2	0.5; 1	0.4; 2	0.3; 1	0.1; 1	7.0
GAD3/ABC	19–27 Nov	?	?	27.7; 117	23.0; 99	14.1; 45	13.0; 34	6.5; 9	3.4; 14	1.8; 3	2.0; 8	1.6; 7	1.0; 4	1.0; 2	0.5; 2	0.7; 2	0.4; 2	0.2; 1	0.1; 1	4.7
ElectoPanel/Electomanía	13–20 Nov	1,250	?	26.4; 113	20.1; 84	16.3; 58	13.6; 38	7.3; 12	3.6; 13	2.1; 2	2.2; 8	1.6; 7	1.1; 5	1.0; 2	0.5; 2	0.5; 1	0.4; 2	0.3; 1	0.1; 1	6.3
ElectoPanel/Electomanía	12 Nov	1,510	?	27.5; 117	21.4; 91	15.6; 55	13.7; 38	5.8; 6	3.6; 13	2.0; 2	2.2; 8	1.6; 6	1.2; 5	1.0; 2	0.5; 2	0.5; 1	0.4; 2	0.3; 1	0.1; 1	6.1
November 2019 general election	10 Nov	—N/a	66.2	28.0; 120	20.8; 89	15.1; 52	12.9; 35	6.8; 10	3.6; 13	2.4; 3	2.2; 8	1.6; 6	1.1; 5	1.0; 2	0.5; 2	0.5; 1	0.4; 2	0.3; 1	0.1; 1	7.2
