= Spanish government formation =

Spanish government formation may refer to:

- 2015–2016 Spanish government formation
- 2019–2020 Spanish government formation
- 2023 Spanish government formation
