= 2021 PSOE federal party congress =

- 26 September 2021 (primary) (Note: The primary election was left uncontested on 13 September, as a result of Pedro Sánchez's candidacy being the only one fielded.); 15–17 October 2021 (congress)

1,077 delegates in the Federal Congress Plurality of delegates needed to win
- Turnout: 1,027 (95.4%)
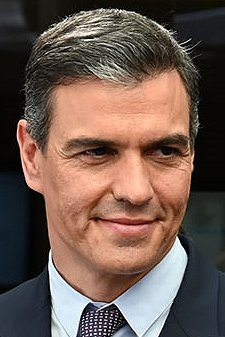

Candidate	Pedro Sánchez	Blank ballots
Popular vote	Uncontested	Uncontested
Executive	975 (94.9%)	52 (5.1%)
Committee	967 (94.3%)	58 (5.7%)
Party leader before election
Pedro Sánchez
Party leader after
election
Pedro Sánchez

The Spanish Socialist Workers' Party (PSOE) held its 40th federal congress in Valencia from 15 October to 17 October 2021, to renovate its governing bodies—including the post of secretary-general, which amounted to that of party leader—and establish the party platform and policy until the next congress

A primary election to elect the new party secretary-general was initially scheduled for 26 September, but as a result of no opposing candidates running for election, Pedro Sánchez was proclaimed unopposed as party leader on 13 September.

== Background ==
Following the election of Pedro Sánchez as prime minister of Spain after a nine month-long government formation process, speculation emerged on the date of the next PSOE party congress; with the previous one having been held in June 2017, this meant a tentative date for the 40th congress of no later than June 2021. In late January 2020, online newspaper El Confidencial reported that Sánchez did not intend to convene the congress until autumn 2020 or early 2021, thus allowing him to focus in the organization of his coalition government and the negotiation of the budget laws.

With initial plans being redrawn as a result of the COVID-19 pandemic, the PSOE's executive commission voted on 11 January 2021 on a postponement to have the 40th congress held in October, with Valencia being selected as the host city on 15 March. with this being confirmed by the party's federal committee—the supreme decision-making body between congresses—on 3 July.

== Timetable ==
The key dates are listed below (all times are CET):

- 3 July: Official announcement of the congress.
- Primaries:
  - 1 September: Submission of pre-candidacies and start of endorsement collection period.
  - 10 September: End of endorsement collection period.
  - 10–12 September: Proclamation of candidates.
  - 13 September: Official start of internal information campaign.
  - 25 September: Last day of internal information campaign.
- Congress delegations:
  - 1 September: Start of pre-candidacy submission period.
  - 3 September: End of pre-candidacy submission period and start of endorsement collection period.
  - 13 September: End of endorsement collection period.
  - 13–15 September: Proclamation of candidates.
  - 16 September: Official start of internal information campaign.
  - 25 September: Last day of internal information campaign.
- 26 September: Election of congress delegations and 1st round of primary election.
- 1–3 October: Pre-congress conventions.
- 3 October: 2nd round of primary election (if required).
- 15–17 October: Federal congress.

== Candidates ==
Candidate	Notable positions	Announced	Ref.
=== Proclaimed ===
Candidates who met endorsement requirements and were officially proclaimed to contest the party congress.
Pedro Sánchez (age 49)	Prime Minister of Spain (since 2018); Secretary-General of the PSOE (2014–2016 and since 2017); Member of the Congress of Deputies for Madrid (2009–2011, 2013–2016 and since 2019); Leader of the Opposition of Spain (2014–2016 and 2017–2018); City Councillor of Madrid (2004–2009)	1 September 2021	

== Results ==
Summary of the 17 October 2021 PSOE congress results
Candidate	Executive		Committee	
Candidate	Votes	%	Votes	%
Pedro Sánchez	975	94.94	967	94.34
Blank ballots	52	5.06	58	5.66
Total	1,027		1,025	
Valid votes	1,027	100.00	1,025	99.81
Invalid votes	0	0.00	2	0.19
Votes cast / turnout	1,027	95.36	1,027	95.36
Not voting	50	4.64	50	4.64
Total delegates	1,077		1,077	

Vote by delegates (Executive Commission)
Sánchez	94.94%
Blank ballots	5.06%

Vote by delegates (Federal Committee)
Sánchez	94.34%
Blank ballots	5.66%
