= 12th Basque Parliament =

Meeting of the Basque Parliament

←	11th

Overview
- Legislative body: Basque Parliament
- Term: 3 August 2020 –
- Election: 12 July 2020
- Government: Urkullu III
- Website: legebiltzarra.eus

Deputies
- Members: 75
- President: Bakartxo Tejeria (EAJ/PNV)
- First Vice-President: Txarli Prieto (PSE-EE)
- Second Vice-President: Eba Blanco (EH Bildu)
- First Secretary: Iñigo Iturrate (EAJ/PNV)
- Second Secretary: Gustavo Angulo (EP-EA)

The 12th Basque Parliament is the current meeting of the Basque Parliament. Its membership was determined by the results of the 2020 regional election held on 12 July 2020. It met for the first time on 3 August 2020.

== Election ==
The 12th Basque regional election was held on 12 July 2020. The governing coalition, composed of the Basque Nationalist Party and the Socialist Party of the Basque Country–Basque Country Left, increased its number of seats and obtained a majority.

Alliance	Votes	%	Seats	+/–
Basque Nationalist Party	349,960	38.70	31	+3
EH Bildu	249,580	27.60	21	+3
Socialist Party of the Basque Country–Basque Country Left	122,248	13.52	10	+1
United We Can–United Left	72,113	7.97	6	-5
People's Party+Citizens	60,650	6.71	6	-3
Vox	17,569	1.94	1	+1
Others/blanks	32,222	3.56	0	–
Total	904,342	100.00	75	–

== History ==
The new parliament met for the first time on 12 July 2020 and elected Bakartxo Tejeria as president of the chamber in the first round of voting.

Other members of the Bureau of the Basque Parliament were also elected on 12 July 2020: Txarli Prieto (PSE-EE), First Vice-president; Eba Blanco (EH Bildu), Second Vice-president; Iñigo Iturrate (EAJ/PNV), First Secretary; and Gustavo Angulo (EP-EA), Second Secretary.

President
Candidate		Votes
Bakartxo Tejeria	EAJ/PNV	41
Amaia Martínez	Vox	1
Blank		33
Total		75

Vice-president
Candidate		Votes
Txarli Prieto	PSE-EE	41
Eba Blanco	EH Bildu	21
Amaia Martínez	Vox	1
Blank		12
Total		75

Secretary
Candidate		Votes
Iñigo Iturrate	EAJ/PNV	37
Gustavo Angulo	EP-EA	11
Laura Garrido	PP+Cs	6
Amaia Martínez	Vox	1
Blank		20
Total		75

A month later, on 3 September, Iñigo Urkullu was re-elected Lehendakari.

== Deaths, disqualifications and resignations ==
The 12th parliament saw the following deaths, disqualifications and resignations:

- 8 September 2020 - Iñaki Arriola (PSE-EE) resigned after being appointed Regional Minister of Territorial Planning, Housing and Transport in the Third Urkullu Government. He was replaced by Miren Gallástegui (PSE-EE).
- 9 September 2020 - Idoia Mendia (PSE-EE) resigned after being appointed Second Vice Lehendakari in the Third Urkullu Government. She was replaced by Ekain Rico (PSE-EE).
- 21 September 2020 - Arantxa Tapia (EAJ/PNV) resigned after being appointed Regional Minister of Economic Development, Sustainability and Environment in the Third Urkullu Government. She was replaced by Aitor Aldasoro (EAJ/PNV).
- 2 October 2020 - Jone Berriozabal (EAJ/PNV) resigned after being appointed deputy minister of Institutional Relations in the Ministry of Public Governance and Self-Government of the Third Urkullu Government. She was replaced by Ana Ruiz de Alegria (EAJ/PNV).
- 25 April 2021 - Ander Rodriguez (EH Bildu) resigned after joinging the University of the Basque Country as a pre-doctoral investigator. He was replaced by Garikoitz Mujika (EH Bildu).
- 3 June 2021 - Nerea Lupardo (EAJ/PNV) resigned after being appoint director of the Euskalduna Conference Centre and Concert Hall. She was replaced by Ainara Zelaia (EAJ/PNV).
- 8 July 2021 - Aitor Aldasoro (EAJ/PNV) resigned in order to become an advisor to Arantxa Tapia. He was replaced by Elena Lete (EAJ/PNV).
- 31 January 2022 - Kerman Orbegozo (EAJ/PNV) resigned after becoming a member of the San Sebastián city council. He was replaced by Garikoitz Mendizabal (EAJ/PNV).
- 31 March 2023 - Luis Javier Telleria (EAJ/PNV) retired and resigned. He was replaced by Miren Josebe Santamaría (EAJ/PNV).
- 23 June 2023 - Maddalen Iriarte (EH Bildu) resigned after becoming a member of the General Assembly of Gipuzkoa following the 2023 Basque foral elections. She was replaced by Roke Akizu (EH Bildu).
- 24 June 2023 - Iker Casanova (EH Bildu) resigned after becoming a member of the General Assembly of Biscay following the 2023 Basque foral elections. He was replaced by Diana Urrea (EH Bildu).
- 30 June 2023 - Irune Berasaluze (EAJ/PNV) resigned after being appointed spokesperson and deputy of Governance in the new Gipuzkoa Provincial Council formed following the 2023 Basque foral elections. She was replaced by Markel Aranburu (EAJ/PNV).
- 6 July 2023 - Leixuri Arrizabalaga (EAJ/PNV) resigned after being appointed spokesperson and deputy of Basque Language, Culture and Sport in the new Biscay Provincial Council formed following the 2023 Basque foral elections. She was replaced by Josune Escota (EAJ/PNV).
- 6 July 2023 - Itxaso Berrojalbiz (EAJ/PNV) resigned after being appointed deputy of Finance in the new Biscay Provincial Council formed following the 2023 Basque foral elections. She was replaced by Ainhoa Santisteban (EAJ/PNV).
- 6 July 2023 - Sonia Perez (PSE-EE) resigned after being appointed deputy of Transport, Mobility and Tourism in the new Biscay Provincial Council formed following the 2023 Basque foral elections. She was replaced by Beatriz Gámiz (PSE-EE).
- 7 July 2023 - Maialen Gurrutxaga (EAJ/PNV) resigned after becoming mayor of Elgoibar. She was replaced by Olatz Peon (EAJ/PNV).
- 18 July 2023 - Laura Pérez (EAJ/PNV) resigned after being appointed to the Provincial Council of Álava. She was replaced by Aitor de la Villa (EAJ/PNV).
- 9 September 2023 - Unai Fernandez de Betoño (EH Bildu) resigned after becoming a member of the Vitoria-Gasteiz City Council. He was replaced by Gorka Ortiz de Guinea (EH Bildu).
- 28 September 2023 - Joseba Díez (EAJ/PNV) resigned after being appointed spokesperson of EAJ/PNV group in the General Assembly of Araba. He was replaced by Gerardo Bengoa (EAJ/PNV).

== Members ==
Name	Constituency	Party	Alliance	Group	Took office	Left office	Notes
Jasone Agirre Garitaonandia	Biscay	Indep.	EH Bildu	EH Bildu	3 August 2020		
Iñaki Aguirre Arizmendi	Gipuzkoa	EAJ/PNV		Basque Nationalists	3 August 2020		
Jon Aiartza Zallo	Biscay	EAJ/PNV		Basque Nationalists	3 August 2020		
Aitor Aldasoro Iturbe	Gipuzkoa	EAJ/PNV		Basque Nationalists	22 September 2020	8 July 2021	Replaced Arantxa Tapia. Replaced by Elena Lete.
Alberto Alonso Martín	Álava	PSE-EE		Basque Socialists	3 August 2020		
Gorka Álvarez Martínez	Biscay	EAJ/PNV		Basque Nationalists	3 August 2020		
Eneko Andueza Lorenzo	Gipuzkoa	PSE-EE		Basque Socialists	3 August 2020		
Gustavo Angulo García	Álava	Podemos	EP-EA	Elkarrekin Podemos-IU	3 August 2020		
Ikoitz Arrese Otegi	Biscay	Sortu	EH Bildu	EH Bildu	3 August 2020		
Iñaki Arriola López	Gipuzkoa	PSE-EE		Basque Socialists	3 August 2020	8 September 2020	Replaced by Miren Gallástegui.
Leixuri Arrizabalaga Arruza	Biscay	EAJ/PNV		Basque Nationalists	3 August 2020		
María Eugenia Arrizabalaga Olaizola	Gipuzkoa	EAJ/PNV		Basque Nationalists	3 August 2020		
Mikel Arruabarrena Azpitarte	Biscay	EAJ/PNV		Basque Nationalists	3 August 2020		
Julen Arzuaga Gumuzio	Biscay	Sortu	EH Bildu	EH Bildu	3 August 2020		
Jon Andoni Atutxa Sainz	Biscay	EAJ/PNV		Basque Nationalists	3 August 2020		
Carmelo Barrio Baroja	Álava	PP	PP+Cs	People's-Citizens	3 August 2020		
Irune Berasaluze Lazkano	Gipuzkoa	EAJ/PNV		Basque Nationalists	3 August 2020		
Jone Berriozabal Bóveda	Álava	EAJ/PNV		Basque Nationalists	3 August 2020	2 October 2020	Replaced by Ana Ruiz de Alegria.
Itxaso Berrojalbiz Zabala	Biscay	EAJ/PNV		Basque Nationalists	3 August 2020		
Eba Blanco de Angulo	Álava	EA	EH Bildu	EH Bildu	3 August 2020		
Iker Casanova Alonso	Biscay	Sortu	EH Bildu	EH Bildu	3 August 2020		
Susana Corcuera Leunda	Gipuzkoa	PSE-EE		Basque Socialists	3 August 2020		
Joseba Díez Antxustegi	Álava	EAJ/PNV		Basque Nationalists	3 August 2020		
Joseba Egibar Artola	Gipuzkoa	EAJ/PNV		Basque Nationalists	3 August 2020		
Josu Erkoreka Gervasio	Biscay	EAJ/PNV		Basque Nationalists	3 August 2020		
Josu Estarrona Elizondo	Álava	Alternatiba	EH Bildu	EH Bildu	3 August 2020		
Itxaso Etxebarria Astondoa	Álava	Indep.	EH Bildu	EH Bildu	3 August 2020		
Oihana Etxebarrieta Legrand	Gipuzkoa	Indep.	EH Bildu	EH Bildu	3 August 2020		
Unai Fernandez de Betoño Saenz de Lacuesta	Álava	Indep.	EH Bildu	EH Bildu	3 August 2020		
Miren Gallástegui Oyarzábal	Gipuzkoa	PSE-EE		Basque Socialists	16 September 2020		Replaces Iñaki Arriola.
Pazis Garcia Ortega	Biscay	Indep.	EH Bildu	EH Bildu	3 August 2020		
Maria Garde Ramirez	Álava	Indep.	EH Bildu	EH Bildu	3 August 2020		
Laura Garrido Knörr	Álava	PP	PP+Cs	People's-Citizens	3 August 2020		
José Manuel Gil Vegas	Álava	Cs	PP+Cs	People's-Citizens	3 August 2020		
Isabel González Rodríguez	Biscay	Podemos	EP-EA	Elkarrekin Podemos-IU	3 August 2020		
Luis Ignacio Gordillo Pérez	Biscay	Cs	PP+Cs	People's-Citizens	3 August 2020		
Miren Edurne Gorrotxategi Azurmendi	Biscay	Podemos	EP-EA	Elkarrekin Podemos-IU	3 August 2020		
Unai Grajales Rodríguez	Álava	EAJ/PNV		Basque Nationalists	3 August 2020		
Maialen Gurrutxaga Uranga	Gipuzkoa	EAJ/PNV		Basque Nationalists	3 August 2020		
Jon Hernández Hidalgo	Gipuzkoa	PCE-EPK	EP-EA	Elkarrekin Podemos-IU	3 August 2020		
Maitane Ipiñazar Miranda	Biscay	EAJ/PNV		Basque Nationalists	3 August 2020		
Maddalen Iriarte Okiñena	Gipuzkoa	Indep.	EH Bildu	EH Bildu	3 August 2020		
Ibai Iriarte San Vicente	Gipuzkoa	Indep.	EH Bildu	EH Bildu	3 August 2020		
Carlos Iturgaiz Angulo	Biscay	PP	PP+Cs	People's-Citizens	3 August 2020		
Iñigo Iturrate Ibarra	Biscay	EAJ/PNV		Basque Nationalists	3 August 2020		
Eva Juez Garmendia	Gipuzkoa	EAJ/PNV		Basque Nationalists	3 August 2020		
Nerea Kortajarena Ibáñez	Gipuzkoa	Indep.	EH Bildu	EH Bildu	3 August 2020		
Estibaliz Larrauri Aranguren	Álava	EAJ/PNV		Basque Nationalists	3 August 2020		
Muriel Larrea Laso	Gipuzkoa	PP	PP+Cs	People's-Citizens	3 August 2020		
Elena Lete García	Gipuzkoa	EAJ/PNV		Basque Nationalists	15 July 2021		Replaces Aitor Aldasoro.
Nerea Lupardo Atutxa	Biscay	EAJ/PNV		Basque Nationalists	3 August 2020	3 June 2021	Replaced by Ainara Zelaia.
Lore Martinez Axpe	Gipuzkoa	EA	EH Bildu	EH Bildu	3 August 2020		
Amaia Martínez Grisaleña	Álava	Vox		Mixed-Vox	3 August 2020		
Iñigo Martínez Zatón	Álava	PCE-EPK	EP-EA	Elkarrekin Podemos-IU	3 August 2020		
Idoia Mendia Cueva	Biscay	PSE-EE		Basque Socialists	3 August 2020	9 September 2020	Replaced by Ekain Rico.
Garikoitz Mendizabal Etxeberria	Gipuzkoa	EAJ/PNV		Basque Nationalists	1 February 2022		Replaces Kerman Orbegozo.
Rakel Molina Pérez	Álava	EAJ/PNV		Basque Nationalists	3 August 2020		
Garikoitz Mujika Iriondo	Gipuzkoa	Sortu	EH Bildu	EH Bildu	26 April 2021		Replaces Ander Rodríguez.
Kerman Orbegozo Uribe	Gipuzkoa	EAJ/PNV		Basque Nationalists	3 August 2020	31 January 2022	Replaced by Garikoitz Mendizabal.
Mikel Otero Gabirondo	Álava	Indep.	EH Bildu	EH Bildu	3 August 2020		
José Antonio Pastor Garrido	Biscay	PSE-EE		Basque Socialists	3 August 2020		
Laura Pérez Borinaga	Álava	EAJ/PNV		Basque Nationalists	3 August 2020		
Sonia Pérez Ezquerra	Biscay	PSE-EE		Basque Socialists	3 August 2020		
Leire Pinedo Bustamante	Biscay	EA	EH Bildu	EH Bildu	3 August 2020		
Txarli Prieto San Vicente	Álava	PSE-EE		Basque Socialists	3 August 2020		
Ekain Rico Lezama	Biscay	PSE-EE		Basque Socialists	11 September 2020		Replaces Idoia Mendia.
Ander Rodriguez Lejarza	Gipuzkoa	Alternatiba	EH Bildu	EH Bildu	3 August 2020	25 April 2021	Replaced by Garikoitz Mujika
Arkaitz Rodriguez Torres	Gipuzkoa	Sortu	EH Bildu	EH Bildu	3 August 2020		
Ana Ruiz de Alegria Maestu	Álava	EAJ/PNV		Basque Nationalists	6 October 2020		Replaces Jone Berriozabal.
Eraitz Saez de Egilaz Ramos	Gipuzkoa	Indep.	EH Bildu	EH Bildu	3 August 2020		
María Jesús San José López	Álava	PSE-EE		Basque Socialists	3 August 2020		
Gloria Sánchez Martín	Álava	PSE-EE		Basque Socialists	3 August 2020		
David Soto Rodríguez	Gipuzkoa	Podemos	EP-EA	Elkarrekin Podemos-IU	3 August 2020		
José Antonio Suso Pérez de Arenaza	Álava	EAJ/PNV		Basque Nationalists	3 August 2020		
Arantxa Tapia Otaegi	Gipuzkoa	EAJ/PNV		Basque Nationalists	3 August 2020	21 September 2020	Replaced by Aitor Aldasoro.
Bakartxo Tejeria Otermin	Gipuzkoa	EAJ/PNV		Basque Nationalists	3 August 2020		
Luis Javier Telleria Orriols	Álava	EAJ/PNV		Basque Nationalists	3 August 2020		
Rebeka Ubera Aranzeta	Gipuzkoa	Indep.	EH Bildu	EH Bildu	3 August 2020		
Iñigo Urkullu Renteria	Álava	EAJ/PNV		Basque Nationalists	3 August 2020		
Aitor Urrutia Oianguren	Gipuzkoa	EAJ/PNV		Basque Nationalists	3 August 2020		
Alaitz Zabala Zarate	Biscay	EAJ/PNV		Basque Nationalists	3 August 2020		
Ainara Zelaia Markaida	Biscay	EAJ/PNV		Basque Nationalists	4 June 2021		Replaces Nerea Lupardo.
Irune Zuluaga Zamalloa	Biscay	EAJ/PNV		Basque Nationalists	3 August 2020		
