= 2002 PP national party congress =

- 25–27 January 2002

3,156 delegates in the National Congress Plurality needed to win
- Opinion polls
- Turnout: 2,541 (80.5%)
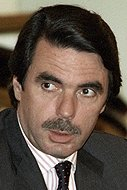

Candidate	José María Aznar	Blank ballots
Delegate vote	2,528 (99.6%)	10 (0.4%)
Board	2,525 (99.5%)	12 (0.5%)
President before election
José María Aznar
Elected President
José María Aznar

The People's Party (PP) held its 14th national congress in Madrid from 25 to 27 January 2002, to renovate its governing bodies—including the post of president, which amounted to that of party leader—and establish the party platform and policy until the next congress

It saw José María Aznar being re-elected unopposed for a fifth term as party president, with 99.6% of the delegate vote in the congress (2,528 votes) and 0.4% of blank ballots (10).

== Candidates ==
Candidate	Notable positions	Announced	Ref.
=== Proposed ===
Candidates who were officially proposed to contest the party congress.
José María Aznar (age 48)	President pro tempore of the Council of the European Union (since 2002); Prime Minister of Spain (since 1996); President of the PP (since 1990); Member of the Congress of Deputies for Madrid (since 1989); Leader of the Opposition of Spain (1989–1996); President of AP/PP of Castile and León (1985–1991); President of the Regional Government of Castile and León (1987–1989); Member of the Cortes of Castile and León for Ávila (1987–1989); Member of the Congress of Deputies for Ávila (1982–1987); Secretary-General of AP in La Rioja (1979–1980)	29 October 2001	

=== Declined ===
The individuals in this section were the subject of speculation about their possible candidacy, but publicly denied or recanted interest in running:

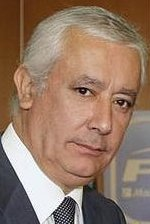
Javier Arenas

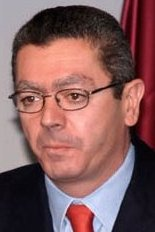
Alberto Ruiz-Gallardón

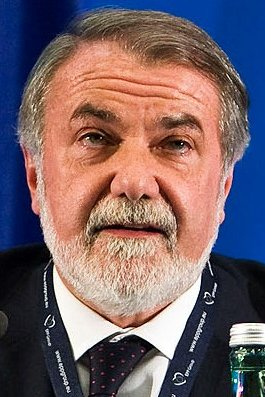
Jaime Mayor Oreja

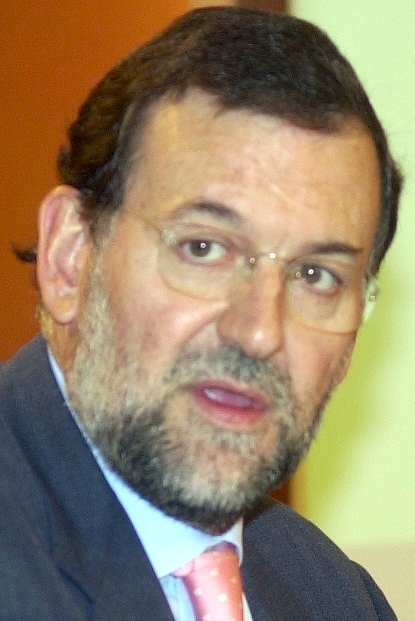
Mariano Rajoy

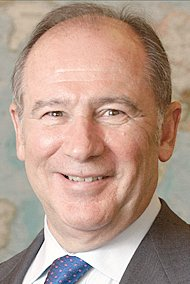
Rodrigo Rato
- Javier Arenas (age 44) — Member of the Congress of Deputies for Seville (1989–1994 and since 2000); Secretary-General of the PP (since 1999); Minister of Labour and Social Affairs of Spain (1996–1999); President of the PP of Andalusia (1993–1999); Senator appointed by the Parliament of Andalusia (1994–1996); Member of the Parliament of Andalusia for Seville (1986–1989 and 1994–1996).
- Alberto Ruiz-Gallardón (age 43) — President of the Community of Madrid (since 1995); Member of the Assembly of Madrid (since 1987); Spokesperson of the People's Parliamentary Group in the Senate (1993–1995); Senator appointed by the Assembly of Madrid (1987–1995); Spokesperson of the People's Group in the Assembly of Madrid (1987–1993); Vice President of AP (1987–1989); Secretary-General of AP (1986–1987); City Councillor of Madrid (1983–1987).
- Jaime Mayor Oreja (age 50) — Member of the Basque Parliament for Biscay (since 2001); Deputy Secretary-General of the PP (since 1996); Member of the Congress of Deputies for Biscay (1989–1990 and 2000–2001); Minister of the Interior of Spain (1996–2001); Member of the Congress of Deputies for Álava (1996–2000); Spokesperson of the People's Group in the Basque Parliament (1990–1996); Member of the Basque Parliament for Álava (1990–1996); President of the PP of the Basque Country (1989–1996); Member of the Basque Parliament for Gipuzkoa (1980 and 1984–1986); Delegate of the Government of Spain in the Basque Country (1982–1983); Member of the Congress of Deputies for Gipuzkoa (1982); Minister of Industry, Tourism and Trade of the Basque Country (1979–1980).
- Mariano Rajoy (age 46) — Minister of the Interior of Spain (since 2001); First Deputy Prime Minister of Spain (since 2000); Deputy Secretary-General of the PP (since 1990); Member of the Congress of Deputies for Pontevedra (1986 and since 1989); Minister of the Presidency of Spain (2000–2001); Minister of Education and Culture of Spain (1999–2000); Minister of Public Administrations of Spain (1996–1999); President of AP/PP in the province of Pontevedra (1983–1986 and 1987–1991); Vice President of the Xunta de Galicia (1986–1987); President of the Provincial Deputation of Pontevedra (1983–1986); City Councillor of Pontevedra (1983–1986); Member of the Parliament of Galicia for Pontevedra (1981–1985); Director-General of Institutional Relations of Galicia (1982).
- Rodrigo Rato (age 52) — Second Deputy Prime Minister for Economic Affairs of Spain (since 2000); Minister of Economy of Spain (since 2000); Deputy Secretary-General of the PP (since 1996); Member of the Congress of Deputies for Madrid (since 1989); Second Deputy Prime Minister of Spain (1996–2000); Minister of Economy and Finance of Spain (1996–2000); Spokesperson of the People's Parliamentary Group in the Congress (1989–1996); Member of the Congress of Deputies for Cádiz (1982–1989).

== Opinion polls ==
Poll results are listed in the tables below in reverse chronological order, showing the most recent first, and using the date the survey's fieldwork was done, as opposed to the date of publication. If such date is unknown, the date of publication is given instead. The highest percentage figure in each polling survey is displayed in bold, and the background shaded in the candidate's colour. In the instance of a tie, the figures with the highest percentages are shaded.

=== PP voters ===
Polling firm/Commissioner	Fieldwork date	Sample size				Other /None	Question	Lead
Polling firm/Commissioner	Fieldwork date	Sample size	M. Oreja	Rajoy	Rato	Other /None	Question	Lead
Vox Pública/El Periódico	25–28 Jun 2001	1,506	–	25.6	**53.3**	21.1		27.7
Vox Pública/El Periódico	16–18 Apr 2001	1,514	–	26.9	**51.1**	22.0		24.2
Vox Pública/El Periódico	29–31 Jan 2001	1,519	11.8	8.7	**16.6**	62.9		4.8

=== Spanish voters ===
Polling firm/Commissioner	Fieldwork date	Sample size								Other /None	Question	Lead
Polling firm/Commissioner	Fieldwork date	Sample size	M. Oreja	Rajoy	Rato	Arenas	De Palacio	Gallardón	Zaplana	Other /None	Question	Lead
Sigma Dos/El Mundo	26–28 Dec 2001	?	7.9	**11.8**	7.6	4.9	0.7	4.4	3.3	–	59.4	3.9
Vox Pública/El Periódico	22–23 Oct 2001	1,509	–	**35.5**	33.0	–	–	–	–	31.5		2.5
Vox Pública/El Periódico	22–23 Oct 2001	1,509	**10.7**	8.1	9.0	1.6	–	5.5	–	65.1		1.7
Vox Pública/El Periódico	25–28 Jun 2001	1,506	–	24.1	**41.6**	–	–	–	–	34.3		17.5
Vox Pública/El Periódico	25–28 Jun 2001	1,506	**11.9**	4.9	9.5	1.5	–	8.8	–	63.4		2.4
Vox Pública/El Periódico	16–18 Apr 2001	1,514	–	27.4	**37.5**	–	–	–	–	35.1		10.1
Vox Pública/El Periódico	16–18 Apr 2001	1,514	**11.5**	7.2	11.3	1.6	–	5.1	–	18.5	44.8	0.2
Vox Pública/El Periódico	29–31 Jan 2001	1,519	–	24.4	**41.9**	–	–	–	–	33.7		17.5
Vox Pública/El Periódico	29–31 Jan 2001	1,519	**9.8**	5.9	**9.8**	4.0	–	5.3	–	19.4	45.8	Tie
Vox Pública/El Periódico	30–31 Oct 2000	1,210	–	26.3	**41.6**	–	–	–	–	32.1		15.3
Vox Pública/El Periódico	30–31 Oct 2000	1,210	7.0	7.3	**15.2**	3.1	–	5.6	–	61.8		7.9

== Results ==
Summary of the 25 January 2002 congress results
Candidate	Executive		Board	
Candidate	Votes	%	Votes	%
José María Aznar	2,528	99.61	2,525	99.53
Blank ballots	10	0.39	12	0.47
Total	2,538		2,537	
Valid votes	2,538	99.88	2,537	99.84
Invalid votes	3	0.12	4	0.16
Votes cast / turnout	2,541	80.51	2,541	80.51
Abstentions	615	19.49	615	19.49
Total delegates	3,156		3,156	

Vote by delegates (Executive)
Aznar	99.61%
Blank ballots	0.39%

Vote by delegates (Board)
Aznar	99.53%
Blank ballots	0.47%
