= Leixuri Arrizabalaga =

Basque lawyer and politician

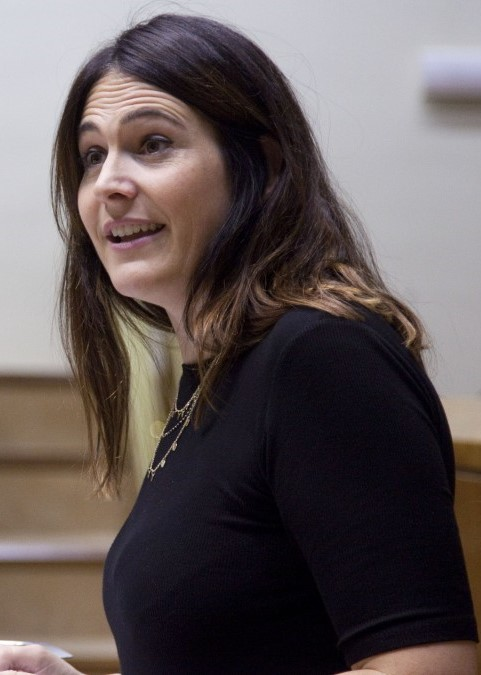
- Arrizabalaga in 2018

Spokesperson of the Biscay Provincial Council
- Incumbent
- Assumed office 7 September 2023
- President: Elixabete Etxanobe
- Preceded by: Lorea Bilbao

Foral deputy of Basque Language, Culture and Sport
- Incumbent
- Assumed office 6 July 2023
- President: Elixabete Etxanobe
- Preceded by: Lorea Bilbao

Member of the Basque Parliament for Biscay
- In office 21 September 2012 – 6 July 2023
- Preceded by: Estibaliz Hernaez
- Succeeded by: Josune Escota
- Parliamentary group: Basque Nationalists

Mayor of Gatika
- In office 13 June 2015 – 30 June 2021
- Preceded by: Jesús Mari Fullaondo
- Succeeded by: Onintze Amezaga

Town councillor of Gatika
- In office 14 June 2003 – 30 June 2021
- Preceded by: (new term)
- Succeeded by: Arantza Egia

Personal details
- Born: Leixuri Arrizabalaga Arruza; 25 April 1981 (age 45) Gatika, Biscay, Spain
- Party: Basque National Party
- Children: 2
- Education: University of Deusto
- Occupation: Lawyer

Leixuri Arrizabalaga Arruza (born 25 April 1981) is a Basque lawyer and politician affiliated with the Basque National Party. She started her political career at a young age as town councillor in her hometown Gatika. She was a member of the Basque Parliament for Biscay from 2012 to 2023, and also served as mayor of Gatika from 2015 to 2021. She was her party's leading candidate for Biscay in the 2020 Basque Parliament election. In 2023 she was appointed to the Provincial Council of Biscay, serving as foral deputy of Basque Language, Culture and Sport and government spokesperson under Deputy General (president) Elixabete Etxanobe.

== Early years ==
Arrizabalaga was born to a mother from Gatika and a father from Plentzia. The family was politically involved in the Basque National Party. Arrizabalaga was raised in Gatika, and she was active in the town life as a member of the local choir and the local traditional Basque dance group.

She graduated in law from the University of Deusto, and coursed a master's degree to practice law in the same university. She centered her career working as a lawyer, especially involved in family law and gender violence cases.

== Political career ==
Arrizabalaga joined Euzko Gaztedi, the youth wing of the Basque National Party, when she was 18 years old. She became a member of the Basque National Party in 2003, affiliated to the local branch of Gatika.

=== Local politics (2003-2021) ===
She contested the 2003 local elections of Gatika in the Basque National Party's list. She became a town councillor for the 2003–2007 term, serving in the local government as councillor for Youth, Culture and Sports. She was re-elected in the 2007 local elections, and was promoted to deputy mayor for the 2007–2011 term.

Arrizabalaga was the second member of the Basque National Party's ticket for the 2011 local elections, and continued to serve as deputy mayor for the 2011–2015 term. She was her party's leading candidate in the 2015 local elections. The party won the election with 44.54% of the vote, and Arrizabalaga was the mayor for the 2015–2019 term. She is the first woman ever to serve as mayor of Gatika.

She was once again the Basque National Party's candidate for mayor in the 2019 local elections. The party increased the vote share to 52.75% and secured an absolute majority, which was its best performance since 1986.

Since 2012, she was also serving as a member of the Basque Parliament. In June 2021 she stepped down as mayor and local councillor, in order to focus on her work in parliament. She was succeeded by Onintze Amezaga.

=== Member of the Basque Parliament (2012-2023) ===
Arrizabalaga contested the 2012 Basque regional election, which saw the Basque National Party return to government. She became a member of parliament after various party colleagues had resigned to serve in government.

She was the spokesperson of her party on equality and gender issues. She was also a designated member of the management board of the Basque Institute of Women (Emakunde). In 2019 she spoke in favour of trans rights.

She was re-elected in the 2016 Basque regional election and the 2020 Basque regional election. In the 2020 election, she led her party's list for Biscay, which increased her political profile.

=== Provincial Council of Biscay (since 2023) ===
After the 2023 Basque foral elections, Elixabete Etxanobe became the new Deputy General (president) of the Biscay Provincial Council. She announced the composition of her cabinet on 5 July 2023, and Arrizabalaga was appointed foral deputy of Basque Language, Culture and Sport. In September 2023 she was also appointed spokesperson of the government.

== Personal life ==
Arrizabalaga is fluent in Basque, Spanish and English. She resides in her hometown, Gatika. She has a twin son and daughter.
