= 2020 Basque regional election =

Election in the Spanish region of the Basque Country

- 12 July 2020

All 75 seats in the Basque Parliament 38 seats needed for a majority
- Opinion polls
- Registered: 1,794,316 ▲0.6%
- Turnout: 911,089 (50.8%) ▼9.2 pp
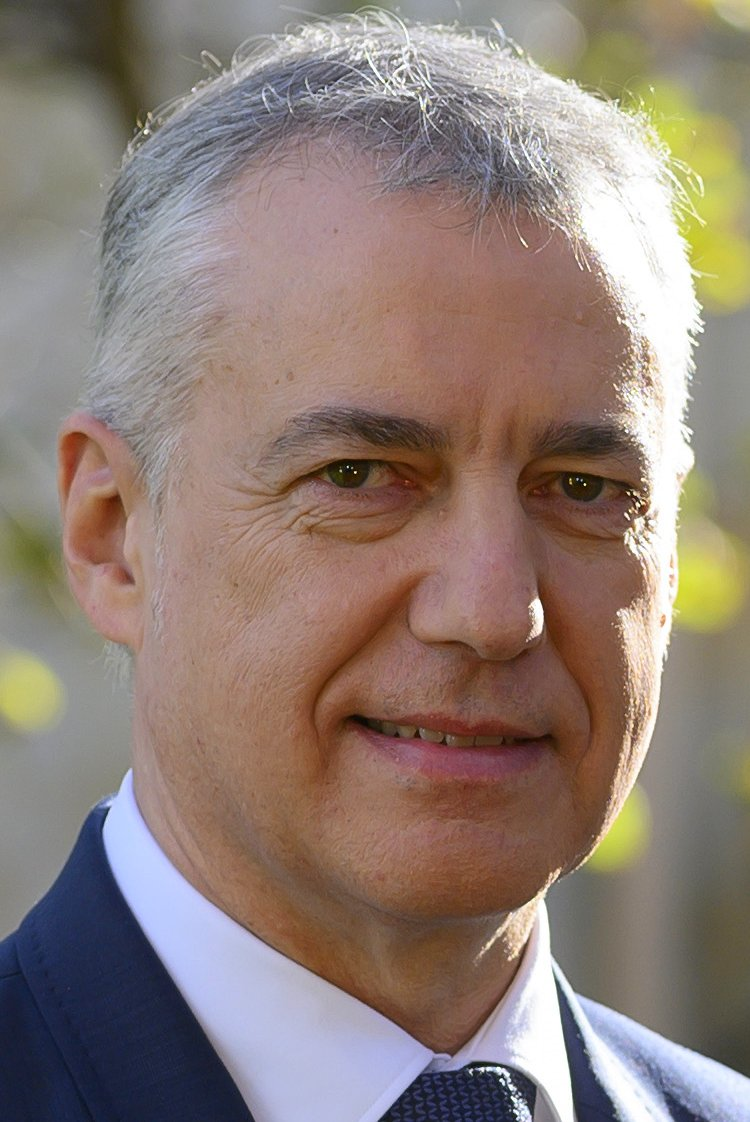

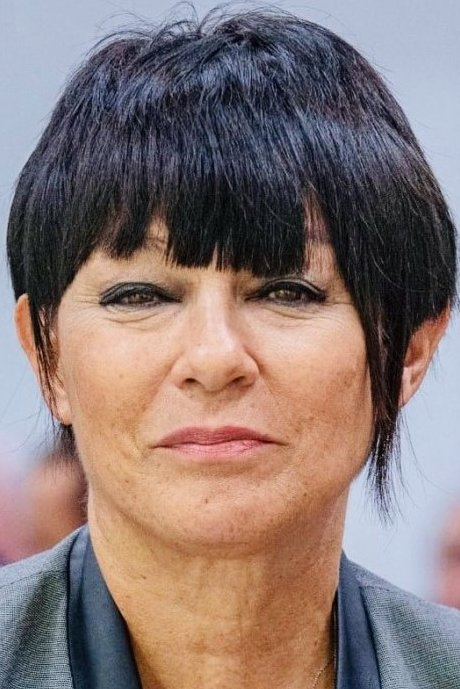

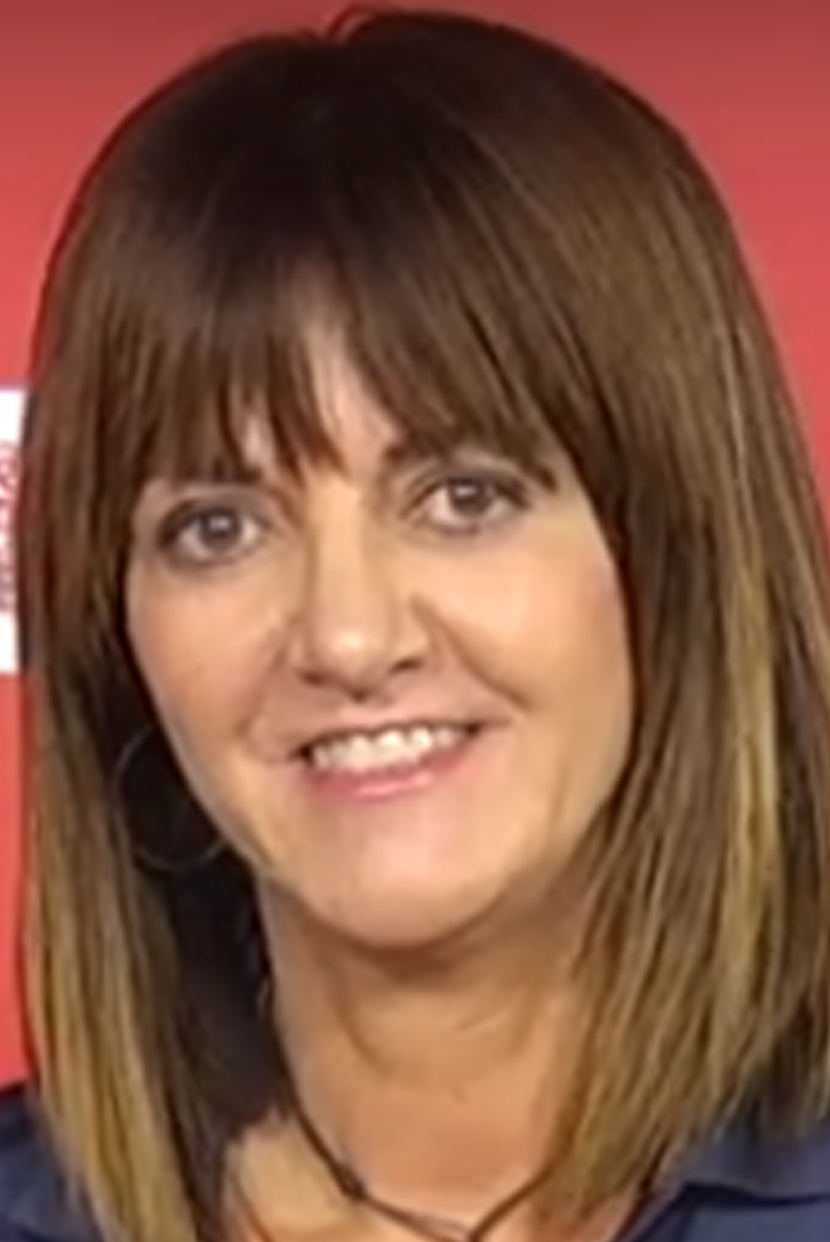

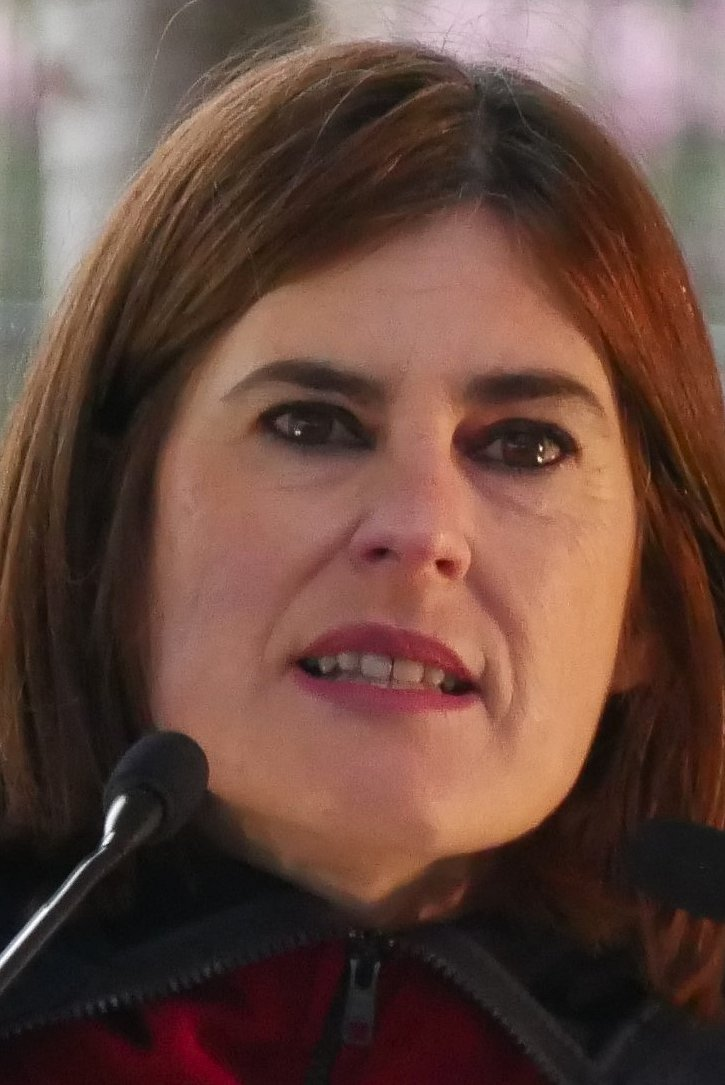

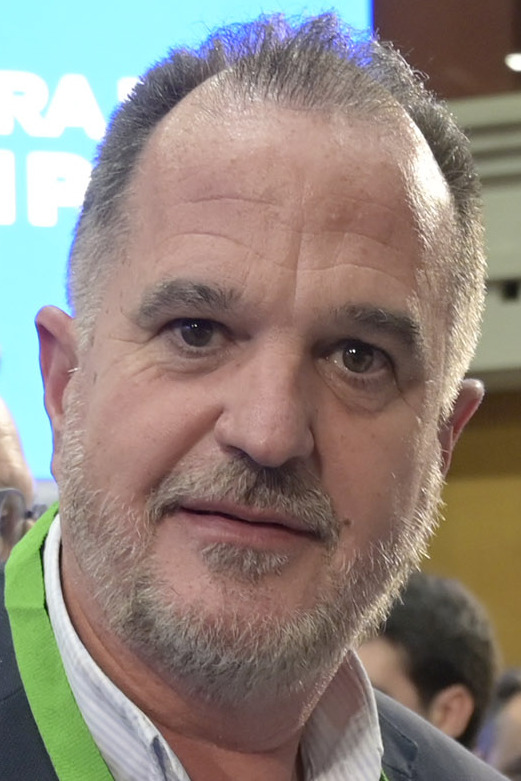

	First party	Second party	Third party
Leader	Iñigo Urkullu	Maddalen Iriarte	Idoia Mendia
Party	EAJ/PNV	EH Bildu	PSE–EE (PSOE)
Leader since	2 December 2007	3 February 2020	20 September 2014
Leader's seat	Álava	Gipuzkoa	Biscay
Last election	28 seats, 37.4%	18 seats, 21.1%	9 seats, 11.9%
Seats won	31	21	10
Seat change	▲3	▲3	▲1
Popular vote	349,960	249,580	122,248
Percentage	38.7%	27.6%	13.5%
Swing	▲1.3 pp	▲6.5 pp	▲1.6 pp
	Fourth party	Fifth party	Sixth party
Leader	Miren Gorrotxategi	Carlos Iturgaiz	None (Note: Vox did not field a single candidate for the post of Lehendakari.)
Party	Elkarrekin; Podemos–IU	PP+Cs	Vox
Leader since	27 February 2020	24 February 2020	—
Leader's seat	Biscay	Biscay	—
Last election	11 seats, 14.8%	9 seats, 12.1% (Note: Results for PP (10.1%, 9 seats) and C's (2.0%, 0 seats) in the 2016 election.)	0 seats, 0.1%
Seats won	6	6	1
Seat change	▼5	▼3	▲1
Popular vote	72,113	60,650	17,569
Percentage	8.0%	6.7%	1.9%
Swing	▼6.8 pp	▼5.4 pp	▲1.8 pp
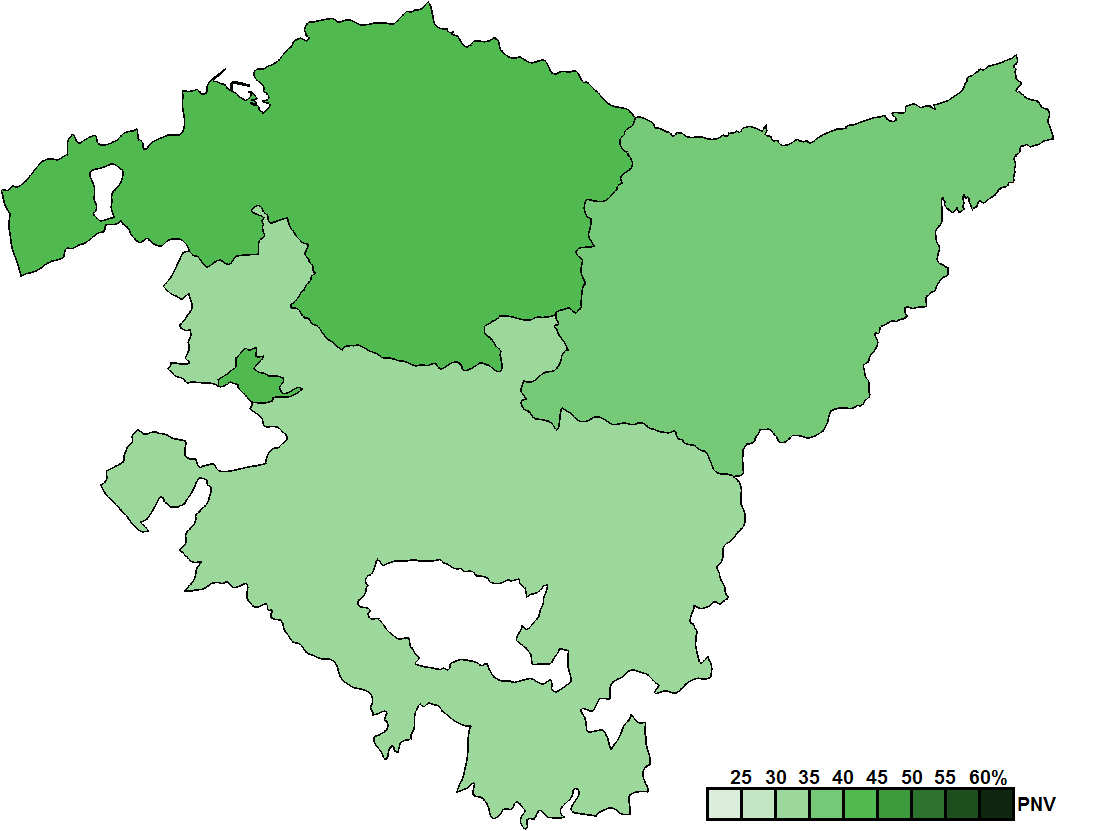
Lehendakari before election
Iñigo Urkullu
EAJ/PNV
Lehendakari after election
Iñigo Urkullu
EAJ/PNV

A regional election was held in the Basque Country on 12 July 2020 to elect the 12th Parliament of the autonomous community. All 75 seats in the Parliament were up for election. It was held concurrently with a regional election in Galicia. The election was initially scheduled for 5 April 2020 but was postponed as a result of the COVID-19 pandemic.

On 4 February 2020, Lehendakari Iñigo Urkullu had discussed holding a snap election within a cabinet meeting, fulfilling a legal requirement previous to any election call and sparking speculation that a regional election was imminent. Six days later, on 10 February, Urkullu confirmed the election for 5 April, seeking to distance himself from the convoluted political landscape in Catalonia after a 2020 election in the region was announced by Catalan president Quim Torra. The announcement of the Basque election prompted Galician president Alberto Núñez Feijóo to trigger a snap election in Galicia as well. However, on 16 March it was announced that the vote would be postponed for the duration of the COVID-19 pandemic in Spain, shortly after Prime Minister Pedro Sánchez's declaration of a nationwide lockdown in the country starting on the previous day.

Urkullu's Basque Nationalist Party (PNV) maintained its status as the largest party in the Basque Parliament with its best result since 1984, which coupled to an increase in support of one seat for the centre-left Socialist Party of the Basque Country–Basque Country Left (PSE-EE)—its coalition partner during the previous legislature—allowed Urkullu to establish a majority coalition government. The left-wing regional nationalist EH Bildu topped its best historical result, benefitting from the collapse of the United We Can–United Left (Elkarrekin Podemos) alliance, which lost nearly half its support. The PP+Cs alliance compromising both the People's Party (PP) and Citizens (Cs) lost roughly half of the seats won by the PP in the 2016 election, although Cs entered the regional parliament for the first time with 2 seats whereas the PP was allocated the alliance's remaining 4. The far-right Spanish unionist Vox entered the Parliament for the first time with one seat. Equo was not able to secure parliamentary representation after having won one seat as a member of the Elkarrekin Podemos alliance in 2016.

== Overview ==
Under the 1979 Statute of Autonomy, the Basque Parliament was the unicameral legislature of the Basque Autonomous Community, having legislative power in devolved matters, as well as the ability to grant or withdraw confidence from a lehendakari. The electoral and procedural rules were supplemented by national law provisions.

=== Date ===
The term of the Basque Parliament expired four years after the date of its previous election, unless it was dissolved earlier. The election decree was required to be issued no later than 25 days before the scheduled expiration date of parliament and published on the following day in the Official Gazette of the Basque Country (BOPV), with election day taking place 54 days after the decree's publication. The previous election was held on 25 September 2016, which meant that the chamber's term would have expired on 25 September 2020. The election decree was required to be published in the BOPV no later than 1 September 2020, setting the latest possible date for election day on 25 October 2020.

The lehendakari had the prerogative to dissolve the Basque Parliament at any given time and call a snap election, provided that no motion of no confidence was in process. In the event of an investiture process failing to elect a lehendakari within a 60-day period from the Parliament's reconvening, the chamber was to be automatically dissolved and a fresh election called.

On 4 February 2020, it was revealed that Iñigo Urkullu was considering holding a snap election within a short timeframe and that he had fulfilled legal requirements for it by raising such hypothesis within a cabinet meeting, with 5 April being regarded as the most likely date. The decision of Catalan president Quim Torra on 29 January to announce a snap Catalan regional election to be held at some point throughout 2020 was said to have raised concerns within Urkullu's government, as the Basque Nationalist Party (PNV) sought to prevent the next Basque regional election from being held simultaneously to prevent any interference from the Catalan political debate into the Basque campaign.

Asked in a plenary session of parliament on 7 February on whether he would be dissolving the chamber within the following days, Urkullu refused to either explicitly confirm or reject such hypothesis, but asked opposition parties for a commitment to approve as many legislation as possible "now and in the future". Sources within the Basque government pointed out that, for an election to be held on 5 April, the dissolution decree would have to be published in the BOPV on 11 February, and that if a snap election was to be eventually called the announcement of it happening could be delayed up to that day. Finally, Urkullu confirmed on 10 February the election date for 5 April, with the subsequent dissolution of parliament to be made official on the next day.

The Basque Parliament was officially dissolved on 11 February 2020 with the publication of the corresponding decree in the BOPV. As a result of the COVID-19 pandemic, the election's original date was suspended on 17 March, with it being rescheduled for 12 July 2020 on 18 May after the easing of virus spreading conditions and a reduction in the infection rate, resulting in the lockdown established by the state of alarm lasting from 15 March to 21 June.

=== Electoral system ===
Voting for the Parliament was based on universal suffrage, comprising all Spanish nationals over 18 years of age, registered in the Basque Country and with full political rights, provided that they had not been deprived of the right to vote by a final sentence. (Note: Amendments in 2018 granted the right to vote to those legally incapacitated.) Additionally, non-resident citizens were required to apply for voting, a system known as "begged" voting (Spanish: Voto rogado).

The Basque Parliament had 75 seats. All were elected in three multi-member constituencies—corresponding to the provinces of Álava, Biscay and Gipuzkoa, each of which was assigned a fixed number of 25 seats to provide for an equal parliamentary representation of the three provinces—using the D'Hondt method and closed-list proportional voting, with a three percent-threshold of valid votes (including blank ballots) in each constituency. The use of this electoral method resulted in a higher effective threshold depending on district magnitude and vote distribution.

The law did not provide for by-elections to fill vacant seats; instead, any vacancies arising after the proclamation of candidates and during the legislative term were filled by the next candidates on the party lists or, when required, by designated substitutes.

=== Outgoing parliament ===
The table below shows the composition of the parliamentary groups in the chamber at the time of dissolution.

Parliamentary composition in February 2020
Groups	Parties	Legislators	
Groups	Parties	Seats	Total
Basque Nationalists Parliamentary Group	EAJ/PNV	28	28
EH Bildu Parliamentary Group	EH Bildu	18	18
United We Can Parliamentary Group	Podemos	8	11
United We Can Parliamentary Group	EzAn–IU	2	11
United We Can Parliamentary Group	Equo	1	11
Basque Socialists Parliamentary Group	PSE–EE (PSOE)	9	9
Basque People's Parliamentary Group	PP	9	9

== Parties and candidates ==
The electoral law allowed for parties and federations registered in the interior ministry, alliances and groupings of electors to present lists of candidates. Parties and federations intending to form an alliance were required to inform the relevant electoral commission within 10 days of the election call, whereas groupings of electors needed to secure the signature of at least one percent of the electorate in the constituencies for which they sought election, disallowing electors from signing for more than one list. Additionally, a balanced composition of men and women was required in the electoral lists, so that candidates of either sex made up at least 40 percent of the total composition.

Below is a list of the main parties and alliances which contested the election:

Candidacy	Parties and alliances	Leading candidate	Ideology	Previous result		Gov.	Ref.
Candidacy	Parties and alliances	Leading candidate	Ideology	Vote %	Seats	Gov.	Ref.
EAJ/PNV	List: Basque Nationalist Party (EAJ/PNV)	Iñigo Urkullu	Basque nationalism Christian democracy Social democracy	37.4%	28	Yes	
EH Bildu	List: Basque Country Gather (EH Bildu) – Create (Sortu) – Basque Solidarity (EA) – Alternative (Alternatiba)	Maddalen Iriarte	Basque independence Abertzale left Socialism	21.1%	18	No	
Elkarrekin; Podemos–IU	List: We Can (Podemos); Plural Left–United Left (EzAn–IU) – Communist Party of the Basque Country (PCE/EPK) – The Dawn Marxist Organization (La Aurora (OM)) – Republican Left (IR) – Feminist Party of Spain (PFE)	Miren Gorrotxategi	Left-wing populism Direct democracy Democratic socialism	14.8%	11	No	
Equo; Berdeak– Verdes	List: Equo (Equo); The Greens (B/LV)	José Ramón Becerra	Green politics	14.8%	11	No	
PP+Cs	List: People's Party (PP); Citizens–Party of the Citizenry (Cs)	Carlos Iturgaiz	Conservatism; Liberalism	12.1%	9	No	
PSE–EE (PSOE)	List: Socialist Party of the Basque Country–Basque Country Left (PSE–EE (PSOE))	Idoia Mendia	Social democracy	11.9%	9	Yes	
Vox	List: Vox (Vox)	None	Right-wing populism Ultranationalism; National conservatism	0.1%	0	No	

In August 2018, Pilar Zabala, the leader of Elkarrekin Podemos, announced that she would not seek reelection and would leave politics by the end of the legislature. Ahead of the election, Equo was excluded from the coalition after the party had broken up with the Unidas Podemos nationwide alliance to join Más País in the lead up to the November 2019 Spanish general election.

Alfonso Alonso had been initially scheduled to repeat as the leading candidate for the People's Party (PP) in the regional election, having been confirmed for the post on 10 February 2020. However, the negotiation of a coalition with Citizens (Cs) which the Basque PP received with heavy criticism, amid claims of having been overruled and swept aside by the party's national leadership in the coalition talks, triggered an internal clash which led national PP leader Pablo Casado to force Alonso's removal as candidate on 23 February and propose Carlos Iturgaiz for the post instead.

== Campaign ==
=== Timetable ===
The key dates are listed below (all times are CET):

- 10 February: The election decree is issued with the countersign of the lehendakari, after deliberation in the Government.
- 11 February: Formal dissolution of parliament.
- 17 March: Election postponement due to the COVID-19 pandemic; all election procedures and preparations are suspended until further notice.
- 18 May: The election decree is newly issued with the countersign of the lehendakari, after deliberation in the Government.
- 19 May: Start of prohibition period on the inauguration of public works, services or projects.
- 22 May: Initial constitution of historical territory and zone electoral commissions with judicial members.
- 25 May: Division of constituencies into polling sections and stations.
- 29 May: Deadline for parties and federations to report on their electoral alliances.
- 1 June: Deadline for electoral register consultation for the purpose of possible corrections.
- 8 June: Deadline for parties, federations, alliances, and groupings of electors to present electoral lists.
- 10 June: Publication of submitted electoral lists in the Official Gazette of the Basque Country (BOPV).
- 13 June: Deadline for non-resident citizens (electors residing abroad (CERA) and citizens temporarily absent from Spain) to apply for voting.
- 15 June: Official proclamation of validly submitted electoral lists.
- 16 June: Publication of proclaimed electoral lists in the BOPV.
- 17 June: Deadline for the selection of polling station members by sortition.
- 25 June: Deadline for the appointment of non-judicial members to historical territory and zone electoral commissions.
- 26 June: Official start of electoral campaigning.
- 2 July: Deadline to apply for postal voting.
- 7 July: Start of legal ban on electoral opinion polling publication; deadline for CERA citizens to vote by mail.
- 8 July: Deadline for postal and temporarily absent voting.
- 10 July: Last day of electoral campaigning; deadline for CERA voting.
- 11 July: Official election silence ("reflection day").
- 12 July: Election day (polling stations open at 9 am and close at 8 pm or once voters present in a queue at/outside the polling station at 8 pm have cast their vote); provisional vote counting.
- 17 July: Start of general vote counting, including CERA votes.
- 21 July: Deadline for the general vote counting.
- 1 August: Deadline for the proclamation of elected members.
- 8 August: Deadline for the publication of definitive election results in the BOPV.

=== Party slogans ===
Party or alliance	Original slogan (Note: The crossed-out slogans depicted below are the ones proposed for the 5 April election before its postponement.)	English translation	Ref.
EAJ/PNV	~~« Gure bidean »~~; ~~« Hacemos Euskadi »~~ « Euskadi zutik, ¡saldremos! »	~~"On our way"~~ ~~"We make the Basque Country"~~ "Stand up Basque Country, we will get out!"	
EH Bildu	« Erantzun berrien garaia da/Tiempo de respuestas. Egiteko prest »	"Time for answers. Ready to do it"	
Elkarrekin Podemos	« Podemos gobernar. Gobernatzeko prest »	"We can govern. Ready to govern"	
PP+Cs	« Un plan para el futuro » « Etorkizunerako plana »	"A plan for the future"	
PSE–EE (PSOE)	~~« Ni un paso atrás »~~; ~~« Aurrera goaz »~~ « Soluciones, erantzunak »	~~"No step backwards"~~ ~~"We go forward"~~ "Solutions, answers"	
Equo	« Votemos distinto, salgamos mejores » « Bozka aldatu, Euskadi hobetu »	"Let's vote different, let's get better" "Change the vote, improve the Basque Country"	
Vox	« Habla por ti »	"Speak by yourself"	

=== Debates ===
2020 Basque regional election debates
Date	Organizer(s)	Moderator(s)	P Present (Note: Denotes a main invitee attending the event.) S Surrogate (Note: Denotes a main invitee not attending the event, sending a surrogate in their place.) NI Not invited A Absent invitee							
Date	Organizer(s)	Moderator(s)	PNV	EH Bildu	EP	PP+Cs	PSE–EE	Equo	Audience	Ref.
24 June	Coordinadora de ONGD de Euskadi	Xabier Madariaga	S Arrizabalaga	S Otero	P Gorrotxategi	S Barrio	S Sánchez	P Becerra	—	
26 June	Cadena SER	Eva Domaika	S Erkoreka	S Casanova	P Gorrotxategi	S Barrio	P Mendia	NI	—	
2 July	ETB 1 (Note: Basque-spoken debate.)	Xabier Usabiaga	P Urkullu	P Iriarte	P Gorrotxategi	S Garrido	P Mendia	P Becerra	1.5% (8,000)	
6 July	El Correo	Marta Madruga; Olatz Barriuso	S Arrizabalaga	S Casanova	P Gorrotxategi	P Iturgaiz	P Mendia	NI	—	
7 July	Euskadi Irratia	Maite Artola	S Egibar	S Kortajarena	S Martinez	S Garrido	S Andueza	P Becerra	—	
7 July	Radio Vitoria	Pilar Ruiz de Larrea	S Suso	S Otero	S Martinez	S Barrio	S Sánchez	P Becerra	—	
7 July	ETB 2	Xabier García Ramsden	P Urkullu	P Iriarte	P Gorrotxategi	P Iturgaiz	P Mendia	P Becerra	11.1% (276,000)	
9 July	Radio Euskadi	Dani Álvarez	S Erkoreka	S Casanova	S Soto	S Barrio	S Pastor	P Becerra	—	

== Opinion polls ==
The tables below list opinion polling results in reverse chronological order, showing the most recent first and using the dates when the survey fieldwork was done, as opposed to the date of publication. Where the fieldwork dates are unknown, the date of publication is given instead. The highest percentage figure in each polling survey is displayed with its background shaded in the leading party's colour. If a tie ensues, this is applied to the figures with the highest percentages. The "Lead" column on the right shows the percentage-point difference between the parties with the highest percentages in a poll.

=== Graphical summary ===
Local regression trend line of poll results from 25 September 2016 to 12 July 2020, with each line corresponding to a political party.

=== Voting intention estimates ===
The table below lists weighted voting intention estimates. Refusals are generally excluded from the party vote percentages, while question wording and the treatment of "don't know" responses and those not intending to vote may vary between polling organisations. When available, seat projections determined by the polling organisations are displayed below (or in place of) the percentages in a smaller font; 38 seats were required for an absolute majority in the Basque Parliament.

Color key:

Poll conducted after legal ban on opinion polls

Polling firm/Commissioner	Fieldwork date	Sample size	Turnout	PNV	EH Bildu	Elkarrekin Podemos	PSE–EE (PSOE)	PP	Cs	Vox	PP+Cs	Lead
2020 regional election	12 Jul 2020	—N/a	50.8	38.7; 31	27.6; 21	8.0; 6	13.5; 10	(Note: Within PP+Cs.)		1.9; 1	6.7; 6	11.1
Gizaker/EITB	9–12 Jul 2020	3,000	?	39.5; 30/32	23.7; 20	10.3; 7/8	14.2; 10/12			2.3; 0/1	6.8; 4/6	15.8
Celeste-Tel/eldiario.es	1–12 Jul 2020	1,200	57.6	40.9; 30/31	23.0; 18/19	10.2; 8	14.0; 11			? 0	7.5; 6/7	17.9
ElectoPanel/Electomanía	10 Jul 2020	2,000	?	40.4; 31	23.1; 18	10.2; 8	13.8; 11			2.2; 1	7.8; 6	17.3
GAD3/ABC	29 Jun–10 Jul 2020	1,445	?	40.3; 31/32	24.3; 19/20	9.3; 7	14.1; 10/11			2.1; 0	7.4; 6/7	16.0
ElectoPanel/Electomanía	9 Jul 2020	2,000	?	40.3; 30	23.1; 18	10.5; 9	13.5; 10			2.4; 1	7.8; 7	17.2
ElectoPanel/Electomanía	8 Jul 2020	2,000	?	40.2; 30	23.0; 17	10.5; 9	13.6; 11			2.5; 1	7.8; 7	17.2
ElectoPanel/Electomanía	7 Jul 2020	2,000	?	40.2; 30	22.8; 17	10.7; 9	13.5; 11			2.5; 1	7.9; 7	17.4
ElectoPanel/Electomanía	6 Jul 2020	2,000	?	40.3; 30	22.7; 17	11.1; 9	13.8; 11			2.3; 1	7.7; 7	17.6
KeyData/Público	6 Jul 2020	?	58.8	39.8; 31	22.9; 19	11.0; 8	14.0; 11			2.0; 0	7.8; 6	16.9
ElectoPanel/Electomanía	5 Jul 2020	2,000	46.7 (Note: Widespread fear to coronavirus pandemic-scenario.)	36.5	27.8	12.1	12.4			2.5	6.9	8.7
ElectoPanel/Electomanía	5 Jul 2020	2,000	61.0 (Note: Main scenario.)	40.0; 31	22.7; 17	11.4; 9	13.8; 11			2.0; 0	8.1; 7	17.3
Demoscopia y Servicios/ESdiario	3–5 Jul 2020	1,000	58.0	39.5; 31	23.2; 19	10.7; 8	14.4; 11			1.9; 0	7.5; 6	16.3
SocioMétrica/El Español	15 Jun–5 Jul 2020	2,100	?	37.9; 29/32	24.1; 18/21	11.8; 7/9	12.7; 9/10			2.9; 0/1	8.4; 6/8	13.8
NC Report/La Razón	29 Jun–3 Jul 2020	1,000	57.9	39.9; 31/32	21.4; 17/18	11.8; 8/9	14.4; 10/11			1.9; 0/1	8.8; 6/7	18.5
Celeste-Tel/eldiario.es	25 Jun–3 Jul 2020	1,100	58.7	40.3; 30/31	22.5; 18/19	11.4; 8	14.6; 11/12			1.6; 0	7.7; 6/7	17.8
GAD3/ABC	22 Jun–3 Jul 2020	1,525	58	41.9; 32/33	22.6; 18/19	9.8; 7/8	13.0; 10			2.4; 0	7.2; 6/7	19.3
ElectoPanel/Electomanía	2 Jul 2020	2,000	?	39.5; 30	23.4; 17	11.1; 9	14.0; 12			2.2; 0	8.0; 7	16.1
Sigma Dos/El Mundo	1–2 Jul 2020	1,000	?	43.8; 34/35	20.6; 17	10.1; 6/7	14.5; 11			1.0; 0	7.6; 6	23.2
Gizaker/EITB	30 Jun–1 Jul 2020	1,200	61.1	41.7; 31/32	23.1; 18/19	10.6; 8	14.0; 10/11			2.0; 0/1	7.3; 6	18.6
Hamalgama Métrica/Okdiario	22 Jun–1 Jul 2020	1,000	?	40.9; 31	22.0; 18	11.3; 8	14.0; 11			2.4; 1	8.0; 6	18.9
40dB/El País	23–30 Jun 2020	1,200	?	40.5; 29/32	23.1; 18/19	11.0; 8	14.4; 10/12			1.0; 0	8.0; 7	17.4
Sigma Dos/Antena 3	28 Jun 2020	?	?	42.6; 34	20.9; 17/18	10.7; 7/8	13.3; 10			0.9; 0	8.5; 6	21.7
ElectoPanel/Electomanía	28 Jun 2020	2,000	?	39.2; 29	23.6; 18	11.1; 9	14.1; 11			2.4; 1	7.9; 7	15.6
Ikerfel/Vocento	23–28 Jun 2020	2,704	58.5	38.7; 31	24.7; 20	11.3; 8	14.5; 11			1.5; 0	6.9; 5	14.0
ElectoPanel/Electomanía	25 Jun 2020	2,000	?	38.5; 29	23.8; 18	10.8; 9	14.0; 12			2.1; 0	8.6; 7	14.7
NC Report/La Razón	15–23 Jun 2020	1,000	?	39.2; 30/31	22.1; 18	10.5; 7/8	14.0; 11			2.4; 0/1	9.9; 7/8	17.1
ElectoPanel/Electomanía	21 Jun 2020	2,000	?	38.5; 29	23.4; 18	10.7; 9	14.0; 12			2.3; 0	9.0; 7	15.1
SyM Consulting	17–20 Jun 2020	2,024	61.7	38.7; 30	22.6; 17/18	9.7; 8/9	14.9; 11/12			2.1; 0/1	9.3; 6/7	16.1
Celeste-Tel/eldiario.es	11–19 Jun 2020	1,200	58.4	39.2; 28/30	23.0; 18/19	10.9; 8	14.7; 11/12			1.1; 0	8.9; 7/9	16.2
CIS	10–19 Jun 2020	3,354	?	40.8; 31/34	19.0; 16/18	14.9; 11/12	15.2; 11/13			1.0; 0	5.9; 3/6	21.8
Gizaker/EITB	17–18 Jun 2020	1,200	61.4	41.7; 32	22.6; 19	11.4; 8	14.4; 11			2.0; 0	6.9; 5	19.1
ElectoPanel/Electomanía	18 Jun 2020	2,000	?	38.8; 30	22.9; 17	10.8; 9	13.9; 11			2.3; 0	9.1; 8	15.9
ElectoPanel/Electomanía	14 Jun 2020	2,000	?	39.0; 30	22.6; 17	10.7; 9	14.4; 11			2.2; 1	8.8; 7	16.4
KeyData/Público	7 Jun 2020	?	61.9	39.9; 31	22.6; 18	11.0; 8	13.9; 11			2.3; 0	8.6; 7	17.3
Ikertalde/GPS	1–6 Jun 2020	1,500	59.6	39.9; 31	22.9; 19	11.1; 8	15.1; 11			1.7; 0	7.4; 6	17.0
NC Report/La Razón	25–30 May 2020	1,000	?	38.1; 29/30	22.9; 18/19	10.1; 7/8	13.3; 10/11			2.6; 0/1	10.8; 8/9	15.2
Metroscopia	29 May 2020	?	?	? 30	? 21	? 7	? 9/10			–	? 7	?
GAD3/ABC	26–29 May 2020	805	?	40.4; 30/31	22.2; 18	10.9; 8/9	12.4; 10			1.7; 0	9.4; 7/9	18.2
PP	25 May 2020	?	?	? 29/30	? 18	? 9	? 10			–	? 7/8	?
Gizaker/EITB	21–23 May 2020	1,200	60.2	41.0; 31	23.4; 19	11.4; 8	14.2; 12			1.7; 0	7.0; 5	17.6
ElectoPanel/Electomanía	1 Apr–15 May 2020	?	?	39.5; 30	22.8; 17	10.6; 9	14.1; 11			2.2; 1	8.7; 7	16.7
ElectoPanel/Electomanía	24 Apr 2020	1,000	?	38.4; 28	23.1; 18	9.9; 9	14.7; 13			2.1; 0	9.0; 7	15.3
ElectoPanel/Electomanía	5 Apr 2020	1,000	?	38.9; 29	22.9; 17	10.3; 9	14.9; 13			2.1; 0	8.4; 7	16.0
NC Report/La Razón	1–4 Apr 2020	1,000	?	36.2; 27/28	24.0; 18/19	9.6; 7/8	13.1; 10/11			2.3; 0/1	12.0; 9/10	12.2
ElectoPanel/Electomanía	8–10 Mar 2020	?	36.4	34.7; 26	26.7; 20	12.8; 11	14.3; 11			2.3; 1	7.0; 6	8.0
ElectoPanel/Electomanía	8–10 Mar 2020	?	52.0 (Note: Mild fear to coronavirus pandemic-scenario.)	38.1; 28	23.4; 18	10.9; 9	14.6; 12			2.4; 1	8.2; 7	14.7
ElectoPanel/Electomanía	8–10 Mar 2020	?	63.2	38.2; 28	23.3; 18	10.9; 9	14.7; 12			2.4; 1	8.3; 7	14.9
ElectoPanel/Electomanía	2–7 Mar 2020	?	?	38.3; 28	23.4; 18	10.9; 9	14.8; 13			2.3; 0	8.2; 7	14.9
GAD3/ABC	2–6 Mar 2020	800	?	39.9; 30/31	22.6; 18/19	9.7; 7	13.9; 10/12			2.9; 1	8.6; 7	17.3
Sigma Dos/El Mundo	2–5 Mar 2020	?	?	43.5; 33/35	21.5; 16/19	10.1; 6/7	14.1; 11			1.2; 0	7.1; 5	22.0
Sigma Dos/Antena 3	1 Mar 2020	?	?	41.9; 32/34	23.1; 18/21	10.3; 6/8	14.8; 10/11			1.2; 0	7.5; 4/5	18.8
ElectoPanel/Electomanía	23 Feb–1 Mar 2020	?	?	38.4; 28	23.5; 18	10.9; 9	15.0; 13			2.2; 0	8.2; 7	14.9
SocioMétrica/El Español	26–28 Feb 2020	900	?	37.3; 27	22.2; 18	12.0; 10	14.1; 12			3.1; 1	9.3; 7	15.1
NC Report/La Razón	24–28 Feb 2020	1,000	?	36.9; 26/27	22.8; 18/19	11.1; 8/9	13.7; 11/12			1.3; 0	11.7; 9/10	14.1
Gizaker/EITB	25–27 Feb 2020	1,200	67.9	40.7; 31	23.2; 18/19	10.6; 7/9	14.5; 11/13			1.9; 0/1	7.3; 5/6	17.5
KeyData/Público	26 Feb 2020	?	61.9	40.2; 31	22.5; 19	11.0; 8	14.5; 12			2.2; 0	7.0; 5	17.7
Ikertalde/GPS	18–26 Feb 2020	1,750	65.4	39.2; 29	23.0; 19	11.4; 8	15.1; 12			1.8; 0	7.9; 7	16.2
ElectoPanel/Electomanía	13–22 Feb 2020	?	?	38.1; 28	23.7; 19	10.8; 8	15.3; 13			2.2; 0	8.0; 7	14.4
ElectoPanel/Electomanía	10–12 Feb 2020	?	?	37.7; 28	23.8; 19	10.9; 8	15.2; 13			1.6; 0	8.5; 7	13.9
ElectoPanel/Electomanía	10–12 Feb 2020	?	?	37.7; 29	23.8; 20	10.9; 9	14.9; 12	7.1; 5	1.3; 0	2.0; 0	–	13.9
GAD3/ABC	6–12 Feb 2020	904	?	40.5; 31/32	22.4; 18/19	10.9; 7/9	12.3; 10	7.9; 7	0.8; 0	2.1; 0	–	18.1
Gizaker/EITB	31 Jan–4 Feb 2020	1,200	69.2	40.9; 31/32	22.6; 17/19	11.2; 8/9	14.4; 11/12	7.2; 5/6	0.7; 0	2.1; 0	–	18.3
ElectoPanel/Electomanía	26–30 Jan 2020	?	?	38.6; 30	23.4; 20	10.5; 8	14.7; 12	7.0; 5	2.1; 0	1.5; 0	–	15.2
November 2019 general election	10 Nov 2019	—N/a	66.4	32.0 (24)	18.7 (15)	15.4 (12)	19.2 (16)	8.8 (7)	1.1 (0)	2.4 (1)	–	12.8
Ikertalde/GPS	1–9 Oct 2019	2,170	62.9	39.7; 30	21.7; 17	11.5; 9	14.8; 12	7.9; 7	1.2; 0	1.3; 0	–	18.0
ElectoPanel/Electomanía	13 Aug 2019	?	?	38.9; 30	23.3; 20	10.1; 8	14.9; 12	6.4; 5	2.5; 0	1.7; 0	–	15.6
ElectoPanel/Electomanía	10 Jul 2019	?	?	39.9; 32	22.8; 20	9.4; 6	16.5; 13	6.3; 4	1.9; 0	1.3; 0	–	17.1
CPS/EHU	28 May–19 Jun 2019	1,200	65.0	39.4; 30	22.8; 19	9.6; 6	18.1; 14	7.4; 6	1.0; 0	0.5; 0	–	16.6
2019 foral election	26 May 2019	—N/a	65.9	38.7 (30)	23.8 (19)	9.9 (7)	17.0 (13)	7.2 (6)	1.3 (0)	0.7 (0)	–	14.9
2019 EP election	26 May 2019	—N/a	62.9	33.9 (27)	22.0 (19)	11.1 (8)	19.0 (15)	6.4 (5)	2.7 (1)	1.2 (0)	–	11.9
April 2019 general election	28 Apr 2019	—N/a	71.8	31.0 (24)	16.7 (13)	17.6 (15)	19.9 (16)	7.4 (6)	3.2 (1)	2.2 (0)	–	12.1
CPS/EHU	15 Oct–9 Nov 2018	1,200	60.0	38.3; 31	23.1; 18	10.3; 7	13.5; 11	8.2; 7	3.0; 1	–	–	15.2
Ikertalde/GPS	8–15 May 2018	2,313	58.8	39.0; 30	22.5; 18	12.8; 10	11.5; 9	8.9; 7	2.6; 1	–	–	16.5
SyM Consulting	7–9 May 2018	650	62.2	38.0; 28	20.9; 15/18	14.2; 11/12	12.5; 9/10	7.4; 6	4.3; 3/4	–	–	17.1
Ikertalde/GPS	26 Feb–5 Mar 2018	1,973	58.6	38.8; 30	21.9; 18	12.9; 10	12.2; 9	8.6; 7	3.1; 1	–	–	16.9
Gizaker/EITB	22–23 Feb 2018	1,200	62.7	40.7; 31	22.3; 18	12.4; 10	12.0; 9	8.1; 6	2.4; 1	–	–	18.4
Ikertalde/GPS	24–30 Oct 2017	2,295	60.3	37.9; 29	22.5; 18	12.5; 10	12.0; 9	9.8; 9	2.1; 0	–	–	15.4
Gizaker/EITB	2–4 Oct 2017	1,200	60.5	39.7; 30	23.4; 19	11.6; 10	12.6; 9	9.0; 7	1.6; 0	–	–	16.3
CPS/EHU	2 May–2 Jun 2017	1,200	60.0	38.6; 29/30	20.8; 15/17	13.9; 10/11	13.0; 9	9.2; 7/9	2.4; 1	–	–	18.1
Ikertalde/GPS	16–22 May 2017	2,268	58.6	37.8; 29	21.6; 18	13.9; 10	11.7; 9	9.7; 9	? 0	–	–	16.2
Gizaker/EITB	22–24 Feb 2017	1,200	60.4	38.2; 29	21.2; 18	12.8; 9	13.4; 11	9.7; 8	2.3; 0	–	–	17.0
Ikertalde/GPS	7–12 Feb 2017	2,268	58.2	38.2; 29	21.6; 18	13.6; 10	11.6; 9	10.0; 9	? 0	–	–	16.6
2016 regional election	25 Sep 2016	—N/a	60.0	37.4; 28	21.1; 18	14.8; 11	11.9; 9	10.1; 9	2.0; 0	0.1; 0	–	16.3

=== Voting preferences ===
The table below lists raw, unweighted voting preferences.

Polling firm/Commissioner	Fieldwork date	Sample size	PNV	EH Bildu	Elkarrekin Podemos	PSE–EE (PSOE)	PP	Cs	Vox	PP+Cs	Question	X mark	Lead
2020 regional election (Note: Does not include non-resident citizens.)	12 Jul 2020	—N/a	20.3	14.5	4.2	7.1			1.0	3.5	—N/a	47.1	5.8
40dB/El País	23–30 Jun 2020	1,200	18.4	14.6	10.2	8.5			0.5	3.6	26.2	11.0	3.8
CIS	10–19 Jun 2020	3,354	21.2	10.9	5.8	7.3			0.3	2.1	41.9	8.2	10.3
Ikertalde/GPS	1–6 Jun 2020	1,500	29.4	15.6	5.1	6.1			0.3	1.3	28.9	10.9	13.8
CIS	17 Feb–3 Mar 2020	3,402	24.8	14.4	5.7	6.7			0.5	1.7	37.6	7.4	10.4
Ikertalde/GPS	18–26 Feb 2020	1,750	22.0	16.3	8.3	7.2			0.3	1.7	19.7	22.7	5.7
November 2019 general election	10 Nov 2019	—N/a	22.0	12.8	10.6	13.2	6.1	0.8	1.7	–	—N/a	31.1	8.8
Ikertalde/GPS	1–9 Oct 2019	2,170	19.5	12.3	8.5	8.3	1.5	0.5	0.5	–	19.7	25.2	7.2
CPS/EHU	28 May–19 Jun 2019	1,200	31.7	19.9	8.9	12.2	1.7	1.2	0.3	–	–	–	11.8
2019 foral election	26 May 2019	—N/a	25.3	15.6	6.5	11.1	4.7	0.8	0.5	–	—N/a	34.1	9.7
2019 EP election	26 May 2019	—N/a	22.1	14.3	7.2	12.3	4.2	1.8	0.8	–	—N/a	34.6	7.8
April 2019 general election	28 Apr 2019	—N/a	23.0	12.4	13.0	14.7	5.5	2.3	1.6	–	—N/a	25.5	8.3
CPS/EHU	15 Oct–9 Nov 2018	1,200	23.8	17.5	10.1	7.8	2.0	1.0	–	–	–	–	6.3
Ikertalde/GPS	8–15 May 2018	2,313	23.6	15.5	9.5	4.8	1.6	1.6	–	–	16.9	22.0	8.1
Ikertalde/GPS	26 Feb–5 Mar 2018	1,973	21.9	13.6	9.7	6.3	1.5	2.5	–	–	15.5	23.4	8.3
Ikertalde/GPS	24–30 Oct 2017	2,295	23.6	16.4	9.1	6.0	2.2	1.5	–	–	16.7	19.9	7.2
CPS/EHU	2 May–2 Jun 2017	1,200	27.2	15.8	13.2	7.4	2.7	1.0	–	–	–	–	11.4
Ikertalde/GPS	16–22 May 2017	2,268	23.9	15.1	10.5	5.3	1.7	–	–	–	15.3	23.0	8.8
Ikertalde/GPS	7–12 Feb 2017	2,268	24.6	15.8	11.2	5.8	2.5	–	–	–	14.1	21.3	8.8
2016 regional election	25 Sep 2016	—N/a	23.2	13.1	9.1	7.4	6.3	1.2	0.0	–	—N/a	37.7	10.1

=== Victory preferences ===
The table below lists opinion polling on the victory preferences for each party in the event of a regional election taking place.

Polling firm/Commissioner	Fieldwork date	Sample size	PNV	EH Bildu	Elkarrekin Podemos	PSE–EE (PSOE)	Vox	PP+Cs	Other/ None	Question	Lead
CIS	10–19 Jun 2020	3,354	32.6	12.5	6.2	9.5	–	2.6	10.4	26.1	10.1
CIS	17 Feb–3 Mar 2020	3,402	34.9	17.0	6.6	7.0	0.6	2.2	8.2	23.6	17.9

=== Victory likelihood ===
The table below lists opinion polling on the perceived likelihood of victory for each party in the event of a regional election taking place.

Polling firm/Commissioner	Fieldwork date	Sample size	PNV	EH Bildu	Elkarrekin Podemos	PSE–EE (PSOE)	Vox	PP+Cs	Other/ None	Question	Lead
CIS	10–19 Jun 2020	3,354	85.0	0.7	–	1.4	–	–	0.8	12.1	83.6
CIS	17 Feb–3 Mar 2020	3,402	83.8	1.6	0.1	1.6	0.0	0.3	0.6	12.1	82.2

=== Preferred Lehendakari ===
The table below lists opinion polling on leader preferences to become lehendakari.

Polling firm/Commissioner	Fieldwork date	Sample size								Other/ None/ Not care	Question	Lead
Polling firm/Commissioner	Fieldwork date	Sample size	Urkullu PNV	Otegi EH Bildu	Iriarte EH Bildu	Gorrotx. EP	Mendia PSE–EE	Iturgaiz PP+Cs	Martínez Vox	Other/ None/ Not care	Question	Lead
CIS	10–19 Jun 2020	3,354	42.7	0.5	10.9	4.0	8.8	2.2	–	7.9	23.0	31.8
CIS	17 Feb–3 Mar 2020	3,402	41.6	–	14.9	4.1	5.8	0.7	–	8.9	22.8	26.7
ElectoPanel/Electomanía	27 Feb 2020	1,100	42.8	–	29.9	5.2	12.6	6.6	3.0	–	–	12.9

== Voter turnout ==
The table below shows registered voter turnout during the election. Figures for election day do not include non-resident citizens, while final figures do.

Province	Time (Election day)									Final		
Province	12:00			17:00			20:00			Final		
Province	2016	2020	+/–	2016	2020	+/–	2016	2020	+/–	2016	2020	+/–
Álava	13.92%	13.51%	−0.41	42.48%	33.21%	−9.27	61.09%	50.31%	−10.78	59.74%	49.00%	−10.74
Biscay	14.51%	13.49%	−1.02	44.86%	36.40%	−8.46	62.82%	52.52%	−10.30	60.48%	50.40%	−10.08
Gipuzkoa	17.53%	15.48%	−2.05	44.46%	36.67%	−7.79	61.87%	54.57%	−7.30	59.38%	52.18%	−7.20
Total	15.40%	14.14%	–1.26	44.38%	36.02%	–8.36	62.26%	52.86%	–9.40	60.02%	50.78%	–9.24

== Results ==
=== Overall ===
← Summary of the 12 July 2020 Basque Parliament election results →
Parties and alliances	Popular vote			Seats	
Parties and alliances	Votes	%	±pp	Total	+/−
Basque Nationalist Party (EAJ/PNV)	349,960	38.70	+1.34	31	+3
Basque Country Gather (EH Bildu)	249,580	27.60	+6.47	21	+3
Socialist Party of the Basque Country–Basque Country Left (PSE–EE (PSOE))	122,248	13.52	+1.66	10	+1
United We Can–United Left (Podemos/Ahal Dugu, Ezker Anitza–IU)	72,113	7.97	−6.79	6	−5
People's Party+Citizens (PP+Cs)^{1}	60,650	6.71	−5.42	6	−3
Vox (Vox)	17,569	1.94	+1.87	1	+1
Equo Greens–Basque Country Greens (Equo Berdeak–Verdes)	11,718	1.30	New	0	±0
Animalist Party Against Mistreatment of Animals (PACMA/ATTKAA)	4,895	0.54	−0.27	0	±0
Blank Seats (EB/AZ)	2,465	0.27	+0.15	0	±0
Zero Cuts–The Greens–Municipalists (Recortes Cero–LV–M)	1,304	0.14	−0.12	0	±0
For a Fairer World (PUM+J)	1,103	0.12	New	0	±0
Free for the Basque Country (LxE/EaL)	699	0.08	New	0	±0
Communist Party of the Workers of the Basque Country (PCTE/ELAK)	549	0.06	New	0	±0
Foralist League (LFF)	309	0.03	New	0	±0
Humanist Party (PH)	279	0.03	±0.00	0	±0
Libertarian Party (P–LIB)	176	0.02	New	0	±0
Spanish Christian Democratic Union (UCDE)	121	0.01	New	0	±0
Welcome (Ongi Etorri)	64	0.01	−0.03	0	±0
Blank ballots	8,540	0.94	+0.31		
Total	904,342			75	±0
Valid votes	904,342	99.26	−0.30		
Invalid votes	6,747	0.74	+0.30		
Votes cast / turnout	911,089	50.78	−9.24		
Abstentions	883,227	49.22	+9.24		
Registered voters	1,794,316				
Sources
Footnotes: ^{1} People's Party+Citizens results are compared to the combined totals of People's Party and Citizens–Party of the Citizenry in the 2016 election.

Popular vote
EAJ/PNV	38.70%
EH Bildu	27.60%
PSE–EE (PSOE)	13.52%
EP–IU	7.97%
PP+Cs	6.71%
Vox	1.94%
Equo	1.30%
Others	1.32%
Blank ballots	0.94%

Seats
EAJ/PNV	41.33%
EH Bildu	28.00%
PSE–EE (PSOE)	13.33%
EP–IU	8.00%
PP+Cs	8.00%
Vox	1.33%

=== Distribution by constituency ===
Constituency	PNV		EH Bildu		PSE–EE		EP–IU		PP+Cs		Vox	
Constituency	%	S	%	S	%	S	%	S	%	S	%	S
Álava	31.9	9	24.6	6	15.5	4	8.0	2	11.4	3	3.8	1
Biscay	42.2	12	23.7	6	13.5	3	8.5	2	6.8	2	1.9	−
Gipuzkoa	36.1	10	34.9	9	12.8	3	7.1	2	4.6	1	1.3	−
Total	38.7	31	27.6	21	13.5	10	8.0	6	6.7	6	1.9	1

== Aftermath ==
=== Government formation ===
Investiture
Ballot →	3 September 2020	
Required majority →	38 out of 75	
Iñigo Urkullu (PNV): • PNV (30); • PSE–EE (10)	40 / 75	check
Maddalen Iriarte (EH Bildu): • EH Bildu (21)	21 / 75	X mark
Abstentions/Blank ballots: • EP (6); • PP (4); • Cs (2); • Vox (1)	13 / 75	
Absentees: • PNV (1)	1 / 75	

== Bibliography ==
- Ley Orgánica 3/1979, de 18 de diciembre, de Estatuto de Autonomía para el País Vasco (Organic Law 3/1979). Official State Gazette (in Spanish). 18 December 1979 [version as of 22 December 1979]. BOE-A-1979-30177.
- Ley 7/1981, de 30 de junio, sobre Ley de Gobierno (Law 7/1981). Official State Gazette (in Spanish). 30 June 1981 [version as of 8 June 2016]. BOE-A-2012-5927.
- Ley Orgánica 5/1985, de 19 de junio, del Régimen Electoral General (Organic Law 5/1985). Official State Gazette (in Spanish). 19 June 1985 [version as of 25 June 2019]. BOE-A-1985-11672.
- Ley 5/1990, de 15 de junio, de Elecciones al Parlamento Vasco (Law 5/1990). Official State Gazette (in Spanish). 15 June 1990 [version as of 7 January 2016]. BOE-A-2012-2859.
- Decreto 2/2020, de 10 de febrero, del Lehendakari, por el que se disuelve el Parlamento Vasco y se convocan elecciones (PDF) (Decree 2/2020). Official Gazette of the Basque Country (in Spanish). 10 February 2020.
- Decreto 7/2020, de 17 de marzo, del Lehendakari, por el que deja sin efecto la celebración de las elecciones al Parlamento Vasco del 5 de abril de 2020, debido a la crisis sanitaria derivada del Covid-19, y se determina la expedición de la nueva convocatoria (PDF) (Decree 7/2020). Official Gazette of the Basque Country (in Spanish). 17 March 2020.
- Decreto 11/2020, de 18 de mayo, del Lehendakari, por el que se convocan elecciones al Parlamento Vasco (PDF) (Decree 11/2020). Official Gazette of the Basque Country (in Spanish). 18 May 2020.
