= PP+Cs =

- Leader: Carlos Iturgaiz
- Founded: 21 February 2020
- Dissolved: 26 July 2023
- Ideology: Conservatism; Christian democracy Liberalism
- Political position: Centre-right to right-wing
- Members: See list of members

PP+Cs was an electoral alliance formed on 21 February 2020 by the People's Party (PP) and Citizens (Cs) in the Basque Country ahead of the 2020 regional election.

== History ==
=== Background ===
The idea of an electoral alliance between the People's Party (PP) and Citizens (Cs) was first proposed by PP leader Pablo Casado following the April 2019 Spanish general election—in which the vote division between the two parties allowed a comfortable victory for the Spanish Socialist Workers' Party (PSOE)—and the local and regional elections, which led to many local and regional governments being formed between the two parties. The España Suma label (English: "Sum Spain") was registered by the PP in August 2019, together with seventeen other similar labels for each autonomous community, inspired by the Navarra Suma electoral alliance in Navarre with the Navarrese People's Union (UPN). The PP attempted to bring Cs into the España Suma umbrella ahead of the November 2019 Spanish general election, but the then-Cs leader Albert Rivera rejected any such agreement either nationally or regionally, aside of the coalition with UPN. After Rivera's resignation following Cs collapse in the general election, the formula was again rejected by the party in December 2019.

On 31 January 2020, two days after Catalan president Quim Torra's announcement of a snap regional election in Catalonia to be held at some point throughout 2020, and amid a major shift of stance from earlier Cs positions as the party drifted in favour of a joint formula with the PP (dubbed by some media as Cataluña Suma, "Sum Catalonia") over the "exceptional situation" in the region, Cs spokesperson in the Congress of Deputies Inés Arrimadas hinted at the possibility of such agreement being exported to Galicia and the Basque Country as well under the "Better United" umbrella (Spanish: Mejor Unidos), excluding the far-right Vox party from such arrangement.

=== Galicia ===
Galician president Alberto Núñez Feijóo, who had already discarded any prospects of a PP–Cs alliance in Galicia in the run up to the November 2019 general election, rejected Arrimadas's offer of a coalition and instead called for the full integration of Cs within the Galician PP. The national PP leadership also rejected a full coalition to be formed in Galicia over their regional brand "already bringing together the entire centre-right electorate", but did not discard incorporating Cs members within the PP's electoral lists.

The announcement of a snap Galician election for 5 April left limited time for negotiations, with little prospects of a PP–Cs coalition being formed in Galicia over strategical discrepancies between the two parties: Cs demanded a full electoral alliance being established in all three regions expected to hold elections in 2020—the Basque Country, Catalonia and Galicia—whereas the PP refused to dissolve the party's brand in Galicia within a larger platform, with Núñez Feijóo commenting on the proposal that "if the sum of 41 seats plus zero seats [those of PP and Cs in the Parliament of Galicia] means that we have to change or disappear as a brand, then that proposal is not honest". After a meeting between Arrimadas and Pablo Casado on 18 February—three days ahead of the legal deadline for the coalition to be formalized—both of them acknowledged that coalition talks were "bogged down" in Galicia, despite Cs having softened their conditions in Galicia, such as renouncing to the Mejor Unidos umbrella (proposing a simple "PP–Cs" label instead) and committing any elected Cs deputies to a "loyal collaboration" with the PP, but defending their autonomy and rejecting Feijóo's proposal of incorporating Cs members as "independents" within the PP's lists.

Despite a last-ditch attempt from Inés Arrimadas to personally convince Feijóo of negotiating a coalition, the proposal was finally rejected on 19 February, with Cs choosing to run on their own instead. Arrimadas warned the PP that the rejection of the coalition in Galicia could have "consequences" in Catalonia where the situation was the reverse, with Cs commanding 36 seats to the PP's 4.

=== Basque Country ===
In the Basque Country, the PP national leadership showed a willingness to negotiate an alliance with Cs with a candidate different than regional party leader Alfonso Alonso, who had been a strong supporter of Soraya Sáenz de Santamaría in the 2018 leadership election and had remained at odds with PP leader Pablo Casado over the party's direction and strategy. Names such as that of former Union, Progress and Democracy (UPyD) leader Rosa Díez were considered for the post. Lehendakari Iñigo Urkullu's announcement of an early election, however, left little time for negotiation between PP and Cs and for replacing Alonso as regional candidate.

In contrast with the situation in Galicia, coalition talks in the Basque Country were reportedly "in a very advanced stage" between the parties' national leaderships, and on 19 February an alliance agreement between PP and Cs was sealed with Alonso as the agreed leading candidate. However, on the next day, the regional branch of the PP rebelled against the agreement after learning through the media that Casado and Arrimadas had established, among the coalition's conditions, that Cs would be given second place in the lists in Álava and Biscay, dubbing it as "unacceptable" to award Cs such an undue weight in representation considering the party's absence of institutional representation in the Basque Country. On 21 February, with the deadline for the alliance's registration expiring at 23:59 CET, Alonso refused to sign the alliance with Cs amid accusations from the Basque PP to the party's national leadership of excluding them from negotiations and of having hid information on the agreement from them, while the national party assured the coalition would be signed nonetheless. Sources within the Basque PP acknowledged to the Europa Press agency that they "would not be recognizing" the alliance agreement with Cs on the announced terms should it proceed.

Subsequently, PP and Cs presented their coalition to the media without making any mention to Alonso as lehendakari candidate, with the PP leadership's confidence on Alonso said to be "completely broken" amid warnings that should he not accept the alliance, he "would have to go". Conversely, their regional branch came out in defence of Alonso—who claimed that he was not contemplating a resignation—and attacked the party's national leadership for their meddling and for sacrificing their local electoral campaign in favour of the party's alliance strategy at the national level. On 23 February and as a result of the controversy, PP leader Pablo Casado forced Alonso's removal as the coalition's candidate and his replacement by Carlos Iturgaiz, former leader of the Basque PP between 1996 and 2004. While PP secretary-general Teodoro García Egea claimed that Alonso's dismissal was "a decision reached by mutual agreement", the Basque PP—of which Alonso still remained president—replied that it was not and that it had been unilaterally enforced by the national party. The next day, Alonso tendered his resignation as leader of the regional party and announced his farewell from politics in disagreement with the events from the previous days.

=== Aftermath ===
The Basque regional election, having been postponed to 12 July 2020 as a result of the COVID-19 pandemic, saw the alliance obtaining a negative result: it collected only half of the votes that PP and Cs secured in 2016, falling from a combined total of 129,000 (12.1%) to 60,000 (6.7%), while losing three seats. Further, the alliance with Cs had left the PP with only four seats out of the nine it held before the election, with the former securing two seats through their agreement with the PP which they were said to have been unlikely to secure on their own. The Basque result put the strategy of a nationwide alliance between both parties into question, and while Cs was willing to attempt such alliance in the upcoming Catalan regional election as well, sectors within the PP considered that such alliance was no longer beneficial and that it "subtracted more than it added", while also being detrimental in that it did not prevent disenchanted voters from fleeing to the far-right Vox party.

== Composition ==
Party
People's Party (PP)
Citizens–Party of the Citizenry (Cs)

== Electoral performance ==
=== Basque Parliament ===
Basque Parliament
Election	Leading candidate	Votes	%	Seats	+/–	Government
2020	Carlos Iturgaiz	60,650	6.71 (#5)	6 / 75	3 (Note: Compared to PP totals in the 2016 regional election.)	Opposition
