= Maddalen Iriarte =

Spanish journalist and politician

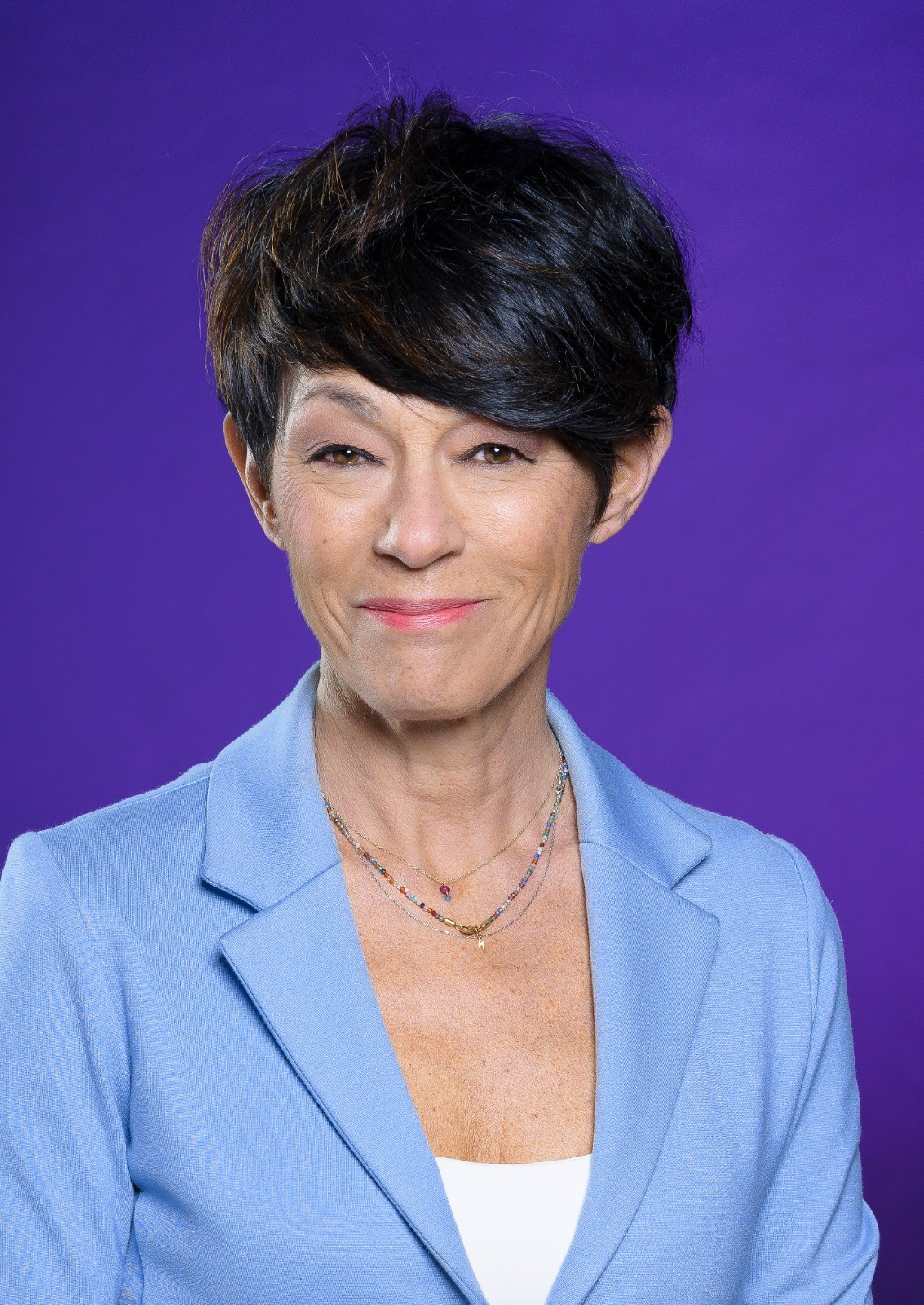
- Maddalen Iriarte in 2023

Member of the Basque Parliament
- In office 21 October 2016 – 23 June 2023
- Constituency: Gipuzkoa

Personal details
- Born: Maddalen Iriarte Okiñena; 21 October 1963 (age 62) San Sebastián, Basque Country, Spain
- Party: EH Bildu
- Education: University of the Basque Country
- Occupation: Journalist, politician

Maddalen Iriarte Okiñena (born 1963 in San Sebastián) is a journalist and politician from the Basque Country in Spain. Since 2016, she is the spokesperson for EH Bildu at the Basque Parliament. She led the candidacy of EH Bildu in the 2020 Basque regional election.

== Biography ==
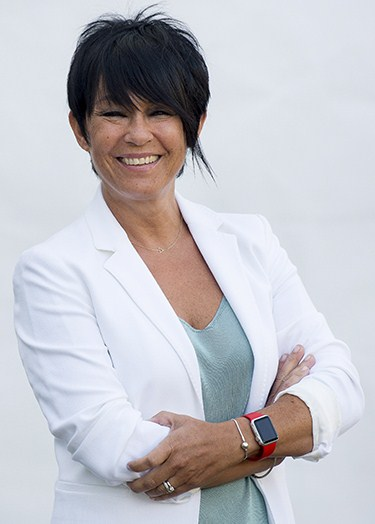
Maddalen Iriarte, 2016

Born in San Sebastián in 1963, Iriarte began a career in journalism at the local radio station Loiola Herri Irratia at the age of eighteen, while she was a Law student at the University of the Basque Country.

In 1986, Iriarte joined the Basque public broadcast service EITB, where she was the presenter and editor of the ETB 1 news program Gaur Egun until 2009. Iriarte was also an editor and presenter on election results programmes, and political debate programmes Ados?, Gau-on and Azpimarra.

In 2016, Iriarte entered politics as a candidate for Member of Parliament at the 2016 Basque regional election: Iriarte was placed second in EH Bildu's list of candidates for the constituency of Gipuzkoa. Iriarte eventually headed the coalition's list after the Election Commission, upheld by the Constitutional Court of Spain, invalidated Arnaldo Otegi's candidature due to the Bateragune Case. After Iriarte was elected Member of Parliament, she was designated spokesperson for EH Bildu, and she was the coalition's candidate for Lehendakari at the investiture session.
