= Elixabete Etxanobe =

Basque lawyer and politician, Prime Minister of Biscay (since 2023)

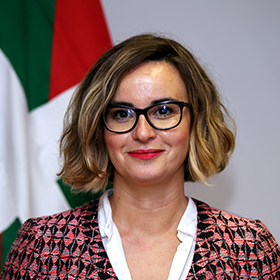
- Etxanobe in 2020

President of the Foral Council of Bizkaia
- Incumbent
- Assumed office 5 July 2023
- Preceded by: Unai Rementeria

Foral Deputy of Public Administration and Institutional Relations of the Foral Council of Bizkaia
- In office 17 March 2021 – 5 July 2023
- President: Unai Rementeria
- Preceded by: Ibone Bengoetxea
- Succeeded by: Ager Izagirre

Deputy Minister of Administration and Services
- In office 3 October 2020 – 16 March 2021
- President: Iñigo Urkullu
- Preceded by: Ana Agirre
- Succeeded by: Miren Goitia

Deputy minister for Institutional Relations
- In office 1 December 2019 – 2 October 2020
- President: Iñigo Urkullu
- Preceded by: Peru Bazako
- Succeeded by: Jone Berriozabal

Director for Local Government Relations and Administrative Registers
- In office 18 January 2013 – 30 November 2019
- Preceded by: José Raimundo Cuesta
- Succeeded by: Itziar Lizeaga

Town councillor in Otxandio
- In office 2007–2011
- Parliamentary group: Basque Nationalist Party
- Constituency: Otxandio

Personal details
- Born: Elixabete Etxanobe Landajuela; 1978 (age 47–48) Otxandio, Spain
- Party: Basque Nationalist Party
- Children: 2
- Education: Law
- Alma mater: University of Deusto
- Occupation: Civil servant

Elixabete Etxanobe Landajuela (born in 1978 in Otxandio) is a Spanish lawyer and politician from the Basque Country affiliated with the Basque Nationalist Party. Since 2023, she serves as the General Deputy (President) of the Foral Council of Bizkaia (Government of Biscay). She is the first woman to hold the position. She previously held various second rank positions in the Basque Government under president Iñigo Urkullu (2013-2021), and joined the Foral Council of Bizkaia in 2021 under General Deputy Unai Rementeria, serving as foral deputy of Public Administration and Institutional Relations until 2023.

== Early years ==
Etxanobe graduated in law from the University of Deusto in 2001, specialising in Economic Law. In 2002, she obtained a master's degree to practice law from CEU San Pablo University, specialising in Private Law. Etxanobe also holds a master's degree from the University of the Basque Country on Fundamental Rights and Public Authorities (2015). She has also attended several courses about administrative law and public procurement.

== Career ==
Etxanobe started her career working as a solicitor for a Madrid-based law firm, from 2001 to 2003. She later joined the Civil Service, working as secretary-comptroller in the Otxandio Town Hall (2003-2004). Since 2004, she holds a permanent post in the Durango Town Hall, responsible for Secretary, Procurement and Heritage. She worked in Durango from 2004 to 2013.

She joined the Basque National Party in 2006, and stood for local elections of Otxandio in 2007, serving as town councillor for the 2007–2011 term.

=== Basque Government ===
Etxanobe joined the Basque Government in 2013, upon being named Director for Local Government Relations and Administrative Registers, serving under the Ministry of Justice and Public Administration in the first government of Iñigo Urkullu (2012-2016). She maintained the position during the second Urkullu government (2016-2020), but serving under the Ministry of Public Governance and Self-Government. In 2019, Etxanobe was promoted and was named deputy minister for Institutional Relations.

In 2020, the third Urkullu government was formed and Etxanobe was named deputy minister of Administration and Services under the Ministry of Security. During her tenure in government, Etxanobe served under minister Josu Erkoreka, who has been considered her political mentor.

=== Foral Council of Bizkaia ===
She resigned from the Basque Government in 2021, when Unai Rementeria, Deputy General (President) of the Foral Council of Bizkaia announced a reshuffle in his cabinet. Etxanobe was named foral deputy of Public Administration and Institutional Relations.

In 2022, Unai Rementeria announced that he would not seek re-election as Deputy General in the May 2023 election. In a surprise move, the Basque National Party announced that Etxanobe would be their leading candidate. She became the first woman of her party to aim for the presidency of the Foral Council of Bizkaia.

The Basque National Party led by Etxanobe won the 2023 foral election in Biscay, securing 38.41% of the vote and 23 seats in the General Assembly of Biscay. Although the party lost 2 seats, they formed a coalition government and secured an absolute majority with PSE-EE. Etxanobe was named Deputy General on 5 July 2023. She is the first woman to hold the position. She later announced the composition of her cabinet, which was the cabinet with most women in the history of the institution.

== Personal life ==
Etxanobe resides in her hometown Otxandio. She is married and is a mother to a son and a daughter (twins). Etxanobe is fluent in Basque, Spanish, English and French.
