= People's Party of the Basque Country =

People's Party of the Basque Country Partido Popular del País Vasco Euskadiko Alderdi Popularra
- President: Javier de Andrés
- Secretary-General: Amaya Fernández Angulo
- Founded: 1989
- Headquarters: C/ San Antonio 1, 1º Vitoria-Gasteiz, Basque Country
- Youth wing: New Generations of the Basque Country
- Ideology: Conservatism; Liberal conservatism; Christian democracy; Spanish nationalism; Spanish unionism
- Political position: Centre-right to right-wing
- National affiliation: People's Party
- Regional affiliation: PP+Cs (2020–2023)
- Congress of Deputies (Basque seats): 2 / 18 (Basque seats)
- Spanish Senate (Basque seats): 0 / 15 (Basque seats)
- Basque Parliament: 7 / 75
- Juntas Generales/Batzar Nagusiak: 17 / 153
- Local seats: 71 / 2,627
- Mayors: 2 / 251

Website
- www.ppvasco.com

The People's Party of the Basque Country (Spanish: Partido Popular del País Vasco or Partido Popular de Euskadi, PP; Basque: Euskadiko Alderdi Popularra, EAP) is the regional section of the People's Party of Spain (PP) in the Basque Country. It was formed in 1989 from the re-foundation of the People's Alliance.

== History ==
It was founded in January 1989 with the birth of the Spanish People's Party, heir of People's Alliance. Its headquarters are located in the Gran Via de Bilbao and is chaired since 2015 by Alfonso Alonso Aranegui.

=== Local Elections of 2007 ===
After the local elections of 2007, the People's Party experienced a setback of almost 60,000 votes in comparison to the local elections of 2003 earning only 153,296 votes(15.78%). The party holds 184 city counselor seats within the Basque country, and the party has the fifth most political power in terms of the number of council seats that they hold, in contrast to the 296 seats they held in 2003. The party governs 4 of the 253 localities of Basque country. Until 2007, they only had governors in the locality of Alava, and following that year, they obtained their first mayoral position in Guipuzcoa. They were challenged by the Basque Nationalist Action(BNA) and the Batasuna parties in the town of Lizarza, the list of the PP was left as the only accepted and with 27 votes (8% of the total votes submitted) they managed to obtain 7 council members and the mayor. The invalid votes were attributed to the BNA and the Basque Nationalist Party (BNP) respectively, reaching 92.39%. In this way, the PP obtained the only mayoral position in Guipuzcoa in its entire history. In Alava, they govern in 4 municipalities: Yecora, where they obtained 51.12% of the votes; Baños de Ebre, where they came in first with 41.63% of the votes, and Lanciego where they had the second most votes, with 35.37%. In Labastida, they also obtained the most votes, but with a simple majority of 39.14% which did not permit them to obtain the mayoral position. Nevertheless, a motion in 2009 paused the elections until the mayor of EB and of PP reached an agreement with 2 expelled town council members on the BNP to alternate the mayor position in the locality. In Biscay, there is no governor, and their best result in 2007 was in Getxo, where they received the second most votes with almost a third of the votes accepted(without telling the BNA)

=== Local and Regional Elections of 2011 ===
In the local and regional elections of 2011, the PP was far from recovering and gathering the votes they lost to the Basque Socialist Party, and they continued to receive a decline in votes in the Basque Country. The PP lost a little more than 6,500 votes in the last local and regional elections. They obtained 146,763 votes, gaining 13.83% of the vote, which means they had 164 council seats from their party (20 less than the last elections). They did not obtain a single mayoral office in Guipizcoa, nor in Biscay.

==== Guipúzcoa ====
The party earned 33,331 votes in Guipuzcoa which was 9.88% of the votes in that region. They obtained 27 council seats in the whole territory (they had won 44 seats in the past election). Their best result was in San Sebastián where they gained 19.51% of the vote and maintained their six council seats. Despite their political position leaving them at second or third in terms of the numbers of votes, they tied for fourth for council members. They had average results in Irun, where they received more than 17% of the votes and five council seats. Despite that, they moved from second to fourth place as a political party, even with a large number of votes for council members. In the rest of the territory, the results they obtained were very modest–the PP did not obtain a significant number of votes—only 10%. The PP had the fourth most political strength in the majority of localities guipuzcoano (led by Bildu, BNP and the Basque Socialist Party (PSE-EE)) and on occasions, the leads included Aralar and Hamaikabat. In the elections for the General Assembly in Guipuzcoa, the PP obtained four seats (two less than they obtained in the previous election when they had won six offices). Three General Assembly seats were obtained in the San Sebastian region and a fourth of them in the Bidasoa region, which was the fourth strongest hold for the party in the territory.

==== Biscay ====
The party obtained 74,403 votes, which was 15.61% of the vote. They suffered a loss of more than 7,600 votes that they had in the previous election. They obtained 55 council positions in the entire territory (in comparison to the 67 that they had previously had). Their best outcomes were in Bilbao and Getxo, where they maintained second place as a political party. Despite maintaining second place in Bilbao, they suffered a noticeable loss of 6,200 votes, and lost a council seat. In Getxo, they also maintained second place, but again, they lost a council seat from the previous election. In the rest of the localities of Biscay, they obtained a much more contentious result, that grew a left margin of Nervión. Despite everything, the left leaning candidates have demonstrated the capacity to move up to the third or fourth place in terms of number of votes. In the General Assembly Elections in Biscay, the PP was able to stay at third or fourth place, but they maintained their eight General Councils within the legislative house.

==== Álava ====
The People's Party won the elections in Alava by a sliver of a margin against the Basque Nationalist Party. Despite losing a little more than 150 votes, the People's Party won a judge seat, thanks to the fall of the Basque Nationalist Party. The same occurred in the mayoral elections in Vitoria. The PP won by fewer than 200 votes, but thanks to the fall of the Basque Nationalist Party, they were able to come in first place in the capital. The party obtained the mayoral office in Vitoria and five more mayoral offices in the regions: Rioja Alvaesa, Baños de Ebro, Labastida, Lagaurdía, Oyón and Yécora. As a result of the support of the PSE-EE/PSOE, the PP won the office of Regional Council of Alava. The boycotting of the two council members of the United Left-Greens (EB-B), who did not want to support the BNP candidate that received votes from the Basque Nationalist Party and the Bildu. The boycotting of the two candidates of the EB-B allowed for the PP to work with the Alavesa Council.

== Electoral performance ==
=== Basque Parliament ===
Basque Parliament
| Election | Leading candidate | Votes | % | Seats | +/– | Government |
| 1990 | Jaime Mayor Oreja | 83,719 | 8.17 (#5) | 6 / 75 | 4 (Note: Compared to People's Alliance–Liberal Party totals in the 1986 regional election.) | Opposition |
| 1994 | Jaime Mayor Oreja | 146,960 | 14.16 (#4) | 11 / 75 | 5 | Opposition |
| 1998 | Carlos Iturgaiz | 251,743 | 19.85 (#2) | 16 / 75 | 5 | Opposition |
| 2001 | Jaime Mayor Oreja | 326,933 | 22.93 (#2) | 19 / 75 | 1 (Note: Compared to the combined totals of People's Party and Alavese Unity in the 1998 regional election.) | Opposition |
| 2005 | María San Gil | 210,614 | 17.27 (#3) | 15 / 75 | 4 | Opposition |
| 2009 | Antonio Basagoiti | 146,148 | 13.95 (#3) | 13 / 75 | 2 | Confidence and supply |
| 2012 | Antonio Basagoiti | 130,584 | 11.59 (#4) | 10 / 75 | 3 | Opposition |
| 2016 | Alfonso Alonso | 107,771 | 10.11 (#5) | 9 / 75 | 1 | Opposition |
| 2020 | Carlos Iturgaiz | Within PP+Cs | | 4 / 75 | 5 | Opposition |
| 2024 | Javier de Andrés | 98,144 | 9.18 (#4) | 7 / 75 | 3 | Opposition |

=== Cortes Generales ===
| Election | Basque Country | | | | | |
| Election | Congress | | | | Senate | |
| Election | Votes | % | Seats | +/– | Seats | +/– |
|---|---|---|---|---|---|---|
| 1989 | 103,697 | 9.37 (#5) | 2 / 21 | 0 (Note: Compared to People's Coalition totals in the 1986 general election.) | 0 / 12 | 0 |
| 1993 | 175,758 | 14.68 (#3) | 4 / 19 | 2 | 1 / 12 | 1 |
| 1996 | 231,286 | 18.34 (#3) | 5 / 19 | 1 | 3 / 12 | 2 |
| 2000 | 323,235 | 28.26 (#2) | 7 / 19 | 2 | 5 / 12 | 2 |
| 2004 | 235,785 | 18.89 (#3) | 4 / 19 | 3 | 1 / 12 | 4 |
| 2008 | 209,244 | 18.53 (#3) | 3 / 18 | 1 | 1 / 12 | 0 |
| 2011 | 210,797 | 17.81 (#4) | 3 / 18 | 0 | 3 / 12 | 2 |
| 2015 | 142,127 | 11.62 (#5) | 2 / 18 | 1 | 1 / 12 | 2 |
| 2016 | 148,553 | 12.87 (#5) | 2 / 18 | 0 | 1 / 12 | 0 |
| Apr. 2019 | 95,041 | 7.45 (#5) | 0 / 18 | 2 | 0 / 12 | 1 |
| Nov. 2019 | 104,746 | 8.85 (#5) | 1 / 18 | 1 | 0 / 12 | 0 |
| 2023 | 131,789 | 11.49 (#4) | 2 / 18 | 1 | 0 / 12 | 0 |

=== European Parliament ===
European Parliament
| Election | Basque Country | | |
| Election | Votes | % | # |
| 1989 | 73,254 | 7.61% | 6th |
| 1994 | 158,010 | 17.48% | 3rd |
| 1999 | 228,688 | 19.76% | 2nd |
| 2004 | 148,617 | 21.05% | 3rd |
| 2009 | 117,057 | 16.03% | 3rd |
| 2014 | 77,583 | 10.20% | 4th |
| 2019 | 72,274 | 6.44% | 5th |
| 2024 | 101,060 | 11.56% | 4th |
