= Biscay (Basque Parliament constituency) =

Coordinates: 43°15′N 2°59′W

- Basque Parliament; Electoral constituency
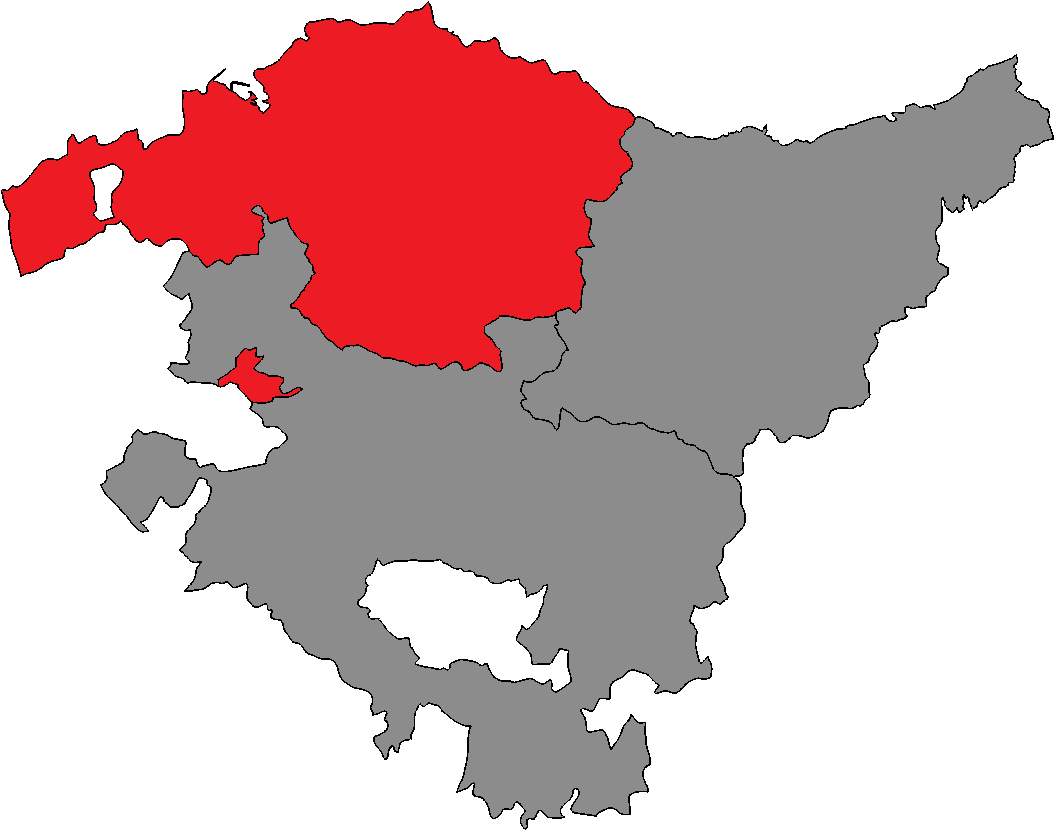
- Location of Biscay within the Basque Country
- Province: Biscay
- Autonomous community: Basque Country
- Population: ▲1,160,133 (2024)
- Electorate: ▼945,878 (2024)
- Major settlements: Bilbao, Barakaldo, Getxo

Current constituency
- Created: 1980
- Seats: 20 (1980–1984); 25 (1984–present)
- Members: PNV (11); EH Bildu (8); PSE–EE (4); PP (2)

Biscay (Basque: Bizkaia, Spanish: Vizcaya) is one of the three constituencies (Spanish: circunscripciones) represented in the Basque Parliament, the regional legislature of the Basque Autonomous Community. The constituency currently elects 25 deputies. Its boundaries correspond to those of the Spanish province of Biscay. The electoral system uses the D'Hondt method and closed-list proportional representation, with a minimum threshold of three percent.

== Electoral system ==
The constituency was created as per the Statute of Autonomy for the Basque Country of 1979 and was first contested in the 1980 regional election. The Statute provided for the three provinces in the Basque Country—Álava, Biscay and Gipuzkoa—to be established as multi-member districts in the Basque Parliament, with this regulation being maintained under the 1983 and 1990 regional electoral laws. Each constituency is allocated a fixed number of 25 seats each, to provide for an equal representation of the three provinces in Parliament as required under the regional Statute. The exception was the 1980 election, when this number was 60.

Voting is on the basis of universal suffrage, which comprises all nationals over eighteen, registered in the Basque Country and in full enjoyment of their political rights. Amendments to the electoral law in 2011 required for Basques abroad to apply for voting before being permitted to vote, a system known as "begged" or expat vote (Spanish: Voto rogado) which was abolished in 2022. Seats are elected using the D'Hondt method and a closed list proportional representation, with an electoral threshold of three percent of valid votes—which, until 1983 and from 1990 includes blank ballots; also and until a 2000 reform, the threshold was set at five percent—being applied in each constituency. The use of the D'Hondt method may result in a higher effective threshold, depending on the district magnitude.

The electoral law allows for parties and federations registered in the interior ministry, coalitions and groupings of electors to present lists of candidates. Parties and federations intending to form a coalition ahead of an election are required to inform the relevant Electoral Commission within ten days of the election call—fifteen before 1985—whereas groupings of electors need to secure the signature of at least one percent of the electorate in the constituencies for which they seek election—one-thousandth of the electorate, with a compulsory minimum of 500 signatures, until 1983; and only the signature of 500 electors from 1983 to 1990—disallowing electors from signing for more than one list of candidates.

== Deputies ==
Deputies 1980–present
Key to parties HB EH EHAK EH Bildu (Note: From 2023.) EH Bildu (Note: Until 2023.) EPK IU/EB EB–B Elkarrekin Podemos Aralar EE PSE/PSE–EE EA PNV/PNV–EA UCD PP+Cs PP CP AP/AP–PL
Parliament	Election	Distribution
1st	1980	4 / 1 / 1 / 3 / 9 / 1 / 1
2nd	1984	3 / 2 / 6 / 12 / 2
3rd	1986	4 / 3 / 6 / 3 / 8 / 1
4th	1990	4 / 2 / 5 / 2 / 10 / 2
5th	1994	3 / 2 / 4 / 2 / 10 / 4
6th	1998	4 / 1 / 5 / 1 / 9 / 5
7th	2001	2 / 1 / 4 / 12 / 6
8th	2005	2 / 1 / 6 / 11 / 5
9th	2009	1 / 8 / 12 / 4
10th	2012	6 / 5 / 11 / 3
11th	2016	5 / 4 / 3 / 11 / 2
12th	2020	6 / 2 / 3 / 12 / 2
13th	2024	8 / 4 / 11 / 2

== Regional elections ==
=== 2024 ===
Summary of the 21 April 2024 Basque Parliament election results in Biscay
Parties and alliances	Popular vote			Seats	
Parties and alliances	Votes	%	±pp	Total	+/−
Basque Nationalist Party (EAJ/PNV)	223,118	39.08	–3.08	11	–1
Basque Country Gather (EH Bildu)	161,486	28.28	+4.58	8	+2
Socialist Party of the Basque Country–Basque Country Left (PSE–EE (PSOE))	79,575	13.94	+0.47	4	+1
People's Party (PP)^{1}	51,644	9.04	+2.25	2	±0
Unite (Sumar)^{2}	19,155	3.35	n/a	0	±0
United We Can–Green Alliance (Podemos/Ahal Dugu–AV)^{2}	12,738	2.23	n/a	0	–2
Vox (Vox)	10,822	1.90	+0.04	0	±0
Animalist Party with the Environment (PACMA)^{3}	2,827	0.50	–0.09	0	±0
Blank Seats to Leave Empty Seats (EB/AZ)	1,260	0.22	–0.01	0	±0
For a Fairer World (PUM+J)	920	0.16	+0.03	0	±0
To Be (Izan)	780	0.14	New	0	±0
Communist Party of the Workers of Spain (PCTE)	666	0.12	±0.00	0	±0
Humanist Party (PH)	475	0.08	+0.02	0	±0
Blank ballots	5,528	0.96	+0.01		
Total	570,994			25	±0
Valid votes	570,994	99.24	+0.06		
Invalid votes	4,371	0.76	–0.06		
Votes cast / turnout	575,365	60.83	+10.43		
Abstentions	370,513	39.17	–10.43		
Registered voters	945,878				
Sources
Footnotes: ^{1} People's Party results are compared to People's Party+Citizens totals in the 2020 election.; ^{2} Within the United We Can–United Left alliance in the 2020 election.; ^{3} Animalist Party with the Environment results are compared to Animalist Party Against Mistreatment of Animals totals in the 2020 election.

=== 2020 ===
Summary of the 12 July 2020 Basque Parliament election results in Biscay
Parties and alliances	Popular vote			Seats	
Parties and alliances	Votes	%	±pp	Total	+/−
Basque Nationalist Party (EAJ/PNV)	200,339	42.16	+0.35	12	+1
Basque Country Gather (EH Bildu)	112,619	23.70	+6.24	6	+1
Socialist Party of the Basque Country–Basque Country Left (PSE–EE (PSOE))	64,001	13.47	+1.82	3	±0
United We Can–United Left (Podemos/Ahal Dugu, Ezker Anitza–IU)	40,453	8.51	–6.24	2	–2
People's Party+Citizens (PP+Cs)^{1}	32,248	6.79	–4.79	2	±0
Vox (Vox)	8,815	1.86	New	0	±0
Equo Greens–Basque Country Greens (Equo Berdeak–Verdes)	5,533	1.16	New	0	±0
Animalist Party Against Mistreatment of Animals (PACMA/ATTKAA)	2,797	0.59	–0.21	0	±0
Blank Seats (EB/AZ)	1,079	0.23	+0.07	0	±0
Zero Cuts–The Greens–Municipalists (Recortes Cero–LV–M)	676	0.14	–0.08	0	±0
For a Fairer World (PUM+J)	613	0.13	New	0	±0
Communist Party of the Workers of the Basque Country (PCTE/ELAK)	549	0.12	New	0	±0
Free for the Basque Country (LxE/EaL)	359	0.08	New	0	±0
Humanist Party (PH)	279	0.06	±0.00	0	±0
Foralist League (LFF)	258	0.05	New	0	±0
Blank ballots	4,524	0.95	+0.34		
Total	475,142			25	±0
Valid votes	475,142	99.18	–0.38		
Invalid votes	3,916	0.82	+0.38		
Votes cast / turnout	479,058	50.40	–10.08		
Abstentions	471,506	49.60	+10.08		
Registered voters	950,564				
Sources
Footnotes: ^{1} People's Party+Citizens results are compared to the combined totals of People's Party and Citizens–Party of the Citizenry in the 2016 election.

=== 2016 ===
Summary of the 25 September 2016 Basque Parliament election results in Biscay
Parties and alliances	Popular vote			Seats	
Parties and alliances	Votes	%	±pp	Total	+/−
Basque Nationalist Party (EAJ/PNV)	238,581	41.81	+3.87	11	±0
Basque Country Gather (EH Bildu)	99,610	17.46	–3.74	5	–1
United We Can (Podemos, Ezker Anitza–IU, Equo)^{1}	84,195	14.75	+11.33	4	+4
Socialist Party of the Basque Country–Basque Country Left (PSE–EE (PSOE))	66,506	11.65	–7.06	3	–2
People's Party (PP)	55,128	9.66	–2.00	2	–1
Citizens–Party of the Citizenry (C's)	10,963	1.92	New	0	±0
Animalist Party Against Mistreatment of Animals (PACMA/ATTKAA)	4,556	0.80	+0.46	0	±0
Let's Win the Basque Country: Yes We Can (Ganemos Irabazi)	3,337	0.58	New	0	±0
Zero Cuts–Green Group (Recortes Cero–GV)	1,277	0.22	New	0	±0
Family and Life Party (PFyV)	1,031	0.18	+0.04	0	±0
Blank Seats (EB/AZ)	903	0.16	–0.76	0	±0
Basque Communists–Communist Party of the Peoples of Spain (EK–PCPE)	466	0.08	+0.01	0	±0
Humanist Party (PH)	351	0.06	–0.03	0	±0
Welcome (Ongi Etorri)	250	0.04	New	0	±0
Blank ballots	3,484	0.61	–0.65		
Total	570,638			25	±0
Valid votes	570,638	99.56	+0.33		
Invalid votes	2,495	0.44	–0.33		
Votes cast / turnout	573,133	60.48	–3.99		
Abstentions	374,503	39.52	+3.99		
Registered voters	947,636				
Sources
Footnotes: ^{1} United We Can results are compared to the combined totals of United Left–The Greens: Plural Left and Equo Greens–Basque Ecologists in the 2012 election.

=== 2012 ===
Summary of the 21 October 2012 Basque Parliament election results in Biscay
Parties and alliances	Popular vote			Seats	
Parties and alliances	Votes	%	±pp	Total	+/-
Basque Nationalist Party (EAJ/PNV)	230,204	37.94	–3.16	11	–1
Basque Country Gather (EH Bildu)^{1}	128,644	21.20	+14.11	6	+5
Socialist Party of the Basque Country–Basque Country Left (PSE–EE (PSOE))	113,536	18.71	–11.54	5	–3
People's Party (PP)	70,749	11.66	–2.26	3	–1
United Left–The Greens: Plural Left (IU–LV)	16,109	2.65	New	0	±0
Union, Progress and Democracy (UPyD)	10,855	1.79	–0.07	0	±0
United Left–Greens (EB–B)	9,817	1.62	–1.79	0	±0
Blank Seats (EB/AZ)	5,598	0.92	New	0	±0
Equo Greens–Basque Ecologists (Equo)^{2}	4,656	0.77	+0.31	0	±0
Hartos.org (Hartos.org)	2,831	0.47	New	0	±0
Animalist Party Against Mistreatment of Animals (PACMA/ATTKAA)	2,052	0.34	+0.08	0	±0
For a Fairer World (PUM+J)	1,159	0.19	–0.02	0	±0
Family and Life Party (PFyV)	821	0.14	–0.04	0	±0
Internationalist Socialist Workers' Party (POSI)	778	0.13	–0.03	0	±0
Humanist Party (PH)	555	0.09	+0.02	0	±0
Basque Communists–Communist Party of the Peoples of Spain (EK–PCPE)	442	0.07	New	0	±0
Communist Unification of Spain (UCE)	307	0.05	New	0	±0
Blank ballots	7,649	1.26	+0.24		
Total	606,762			25	±0
Valid votes	606,762	99.23	+6.19		
Invalid votes	4,721	0.77	–6.19		
Votes cast / turnout	611,483	64.47	–1.87		
Abstentions	336,939	35.53	+1.87		
Registered voters	948,422				
Sources
Footnotes: ^{1} Basque Country Gather results are compared to the combined totals of Aralar and Basque Solidarity in the 2009 election.; ^{2} Equo Greens–Basque Ecologists results are compared to The Greens totals in the 2009 election.

=== 2009 ===
Summary of the 1 March 2009 Basque Parliament election results in Biscay
Parties and alliances	Popular vote			Seats	
Parties and alliances	Votes	%	±pp	Total	+/−
Basque Nationalist Party (EAJ/PNV)^{1}	241,732	41.10	n/a	12	+2
Socialist Party of the Basque Country–Basque Country Left (PSE–EE (PSOE))	177,875	30.25	+7.05	8	+2
People's Party (PP)	81,837	13.92	–3.55	4	–1
Aralar (Aralar)	24,639	4.19	+2.63	1	+1
United Left–Greens (EB–B)	20,080	3.41	–2.10	0	–1
Basque Solidarity (EA)^{1}	17,033	2.90	n/a	0	–1
Union, Progress and Democracy (UPyD)	10,916	1.86	New	0	±0
The Greens (B/LV)	2,689	0.46	New	0	±0
Anti-Bullfighting Party Against Mistreatment of Animals (PACMA/ZAAAA)	1,504	0.26	–0.02	0	±0
For a Fairer World (PUM+J)	1,232	0.21	+0.02	0	±0
Family and Life Party (PFyV)	1,052	0.18	New	0	±0
Internationalist Socialist Workers' Party (POSI)	969	0.16	–0.07	0	±0
Humanist Party (PH)	418	0.07	–0.03	0	±0
Carlist Party of the Basque Country–Carlist Party (EKA–PC)	151	0.03	±0.00	0	±0
Communist Party of the Basque Homelands (PCTV/EHAK)	n/a	n/a	–9.99	0	–2
Blank ballots	5,972	1.02	+0.28		
Total	588,099			25	±0
Valid votes	588,099	93.04	–6.63		
Invalid votes	43,971	6.96	+6.63		
Votes cast / turnout	632,070	66.34	–1.57		
Abstentions	320,774	33.66	+1.57		
Registered voters	952,844				
Sources
Footnotes: ^{1} Within the Basque Nationalist Party–Basque Solidarity alliance in the 2005 election.

=== 2005 ===
Summary of the 17 April 2005 Basque Parliament election results in Biscay
Parties and alliances	Popular vote			Seats	
Parties and alliances	Votes	%	±pp	Total	+/−
Basque Nationalist Party–Basque Solidarity (PNV–EA)	267,247	40.66	–2.76	11	–1
Socialist Party of the Basque Country–Basque Country Left (PSE–EE (PSOE))	152,459	23.20	+5.14	6	+2
People's Party (PP)	114,845	17.47	–5.98	5	–1
Communist Party of the Basque Homelands (PCTV/EHAK)^{1}	65,623	9.99	+1.99	2	±0
United Left–Greens (EB–B)^{2}	36,226	5.51	–0.14	1	±0
Aralar (Aralar)	10,242	1.56	New	0	±0
Greens–Anti-Bullfighting Party Against Mistreatment of Animals (B–PACMA)	1,865	0.28	New	0	±0
Internationalist Socialist Workers' Party (POSI)	1,499	0.23	New	0	±0
For a Fairer World (PUM+J)	1,261	0.19	New	0	±0
Humanist Party (PH)	674	0.10	–0.08	0	±0
Alavese Unity (UA)	216	0.03	New	0	±0
Carlist Party of the Basque Country–Carlist Party (EKA–PC)	179	0.03	New	0	±0
Blank ballots	4,866	0.74	–0.05		
Total	657,202			25	±0
Valid votes	657,202	99.67	+0.08		
Invalid votes	2,164	0.33	–0.08		
Votes cast / turnout	659,366	67.91	–11.21		
Abstentions	311,591	32.09	+11.21		
Registered voters	970,957				
Sources
Footnotes: ^{1} Communist Party of the Basque Homelands results are compared to Basque Citizens totals in the 2001 election.; ^{2} United Left–Greens results are compared to United Left totals in the 2001 election.

=== 2001 ===
Summary of the 13 May 2001 Basque Parliament election results in Biscay
Parties and alliances	Popular vote			Seats	
Parties and alliances	Votes	%	±pp	Total	+/−
Basque Nationalist Party–Basque Solidarity (PNV–EA)^{1}	335,945	43.42	+4.85	12	+2
People's Party (PP)^{2}	181,404	23.45	+3.12	6	+1
Socialist Party of the Basque Country–Basque Country Left (PSE–EE (PSOE))	139,684	18.06	–0.21	4	–1
Basque Citizens (EH)	61,894	8.00	–6.57	2	–2
United Left (IU/EB)	43,701	5.65	–0.55	1	±0
Party of the Democratic Karma (PKD)	2,000	0.26	New	0	±0
Humanist Party (PH)	1,361	0.18	–0.09	0	±0
Workers for Democracy Coalition (TD)	1,017	0.13	New	0	±0
Freedom (Askatasuna)	257	0.03	New	0	±0
Carlist Party (EKA/PC)	220	0.03	New	0	±0
Blank ballots	6,145	0.79	–0.60		
Total	773,628			25	±0
Valid votes	773,628	99.59	+0.16		
Invalid votes	3,180	0.41	–0.16		
Votes cast / turnout	776,808	79.12	+15.59		
Abstentions	204,995	20.88	–15.59		
Registered voters	981,803				
Sources
Footnotes: ^{1} Basque Nationalist Party–Basque Solidarity results are compared to the combined totals of Basque Nationalist Party and Basque Solidarity in the 1998 election.; ^{2} People's Party results are compared to the combined totals of the People's Party and Alavese Unity in the 1998 election.

=== 1998 ===
Summary of the 25 October 1998 Basque Parliament election results in Biscay
Parties and alliances	Popular vote			Seats	
Parties and alliances	Votes	%	±pp	Total	+/−
Basque Nationalist Party (EAJ/PNV)	224,542	32.60	–2.51	9	–1
People's Party (PP)	139,161	20.20	+5.17	5	+1
Socialist Party of the Basque Country–Basque Country Left (PSE–EE (PSOE))	125,834	18.27	+0.89	5	+1
Basque Citizens (EH)^{1}	100,377	14.57	+1.18	4	+1
United Left (IU/EB)	42,714	6.20	–3.85	1	–1
Basque Solidarity (EA)	41,096	5.97	–1.12	1	–1
Natural Law Party (PLN/LNA)	2,769	0.40	New	0	±0
Humanist Party (PH)	1,892	0.27	New	0	±0
Alavese Unity (UA)	913	0.13	–0.13	0	±0
Blank ballots	9,556	1.39	–0.15		
Total	688,854			25	±0
Valid votes	688,854	99.43	+0.03		
Invalid votes	3,972	0.57	–0.03		
Votes cast / turnout	692,781	63.53	+3.16		
Abstentions	298,457	36.47	–3.16		
Registered voters	991,238				
Sources
Footnotes: ^{1} Basque Citizens results are compared to Popular Unity totals in the 1994 election.

=== 1994 ===
Summary of the 23 October 1994 Basque Parliament election results in Biscay
Parties and alliances	Popular vote			Seats	
Parties and alliances	Votes	%	±pp	Total	+/−
Basque Nationalist Party (EAJ/PNV)	201,833	35.11	+0.74	10	±0
Socialist Party of the Basque Country–Basque Country Left (PSE–EE (PSOE))^{1}	99,931	17.38	–9.86	4	–3
People's Party (PP)	86,398	15.03	+6.41	4	+2
Popular Unity (HB)	76,988	13.39	–2.83	3	–1
United Left (IU/EB)	57,765	10.05	+8.34	2	+2
Basque Solidarity (EA)	40,752	7.09	–0.91	2	±0
Alavese Unity (UA)	1,489	0.26	+0.23	0	±0
Coalition for a New Socialist Party (NPS)^{2}	804	0.14	+0.08	0	±0
Blank ballots	8,865	1.54	+0.88		
Total	574,825			25	±0
Valid votes	574,825	99.40	–0.08		
Invalid votes	3,496	0.60	+0.08		
Votes cast / turnout	578,321	60.37	–0.16		
Abstentions	379,691	39.63	+0.16		
Registered voters	958,012				
Sources
Footnotes: ^{1} Socialist Party of the Basque Country–Basque Country Left results are compared to the combined totals of the Socialist Party of the Basque Country and Basque Country Left in the 1990 election.; ^{2} Coalition for a New Socialist Party results are compared to Alliance for the Republic totals in the 1990 election.

=== 1990 ===
Summary of the 28 October 1990 Basque Parliament election results in Biscay
Parties and alliances	Popular vote			Seats	
Parties and alliances	Votes	%	±pp	Total	+/−
Basque Nationalist Party (EAJ/PNV)	192,903	34.37	+5.56	10	+2
Socialist Party of the Basque Country (PSE–PSOE)	111,920	19.94	–2.54	5	–1
Popular Unity (HB)	91,047	16.22	+0.27	4	±0
People's Party (PP)^{1}	48,405	8.62	+3.48	2	+1
Basque Solidarity (EA)	44,922	8.00	–3.75	2	–1
Basque Country Left (EE)	40,983	7.30	–2.91	2	–1
United Left (IU/EB)	9,609	1.71	+0.92	0	±0
Socialist Democracy (DS)	3,724	0.66	New	0	±0
Democratic and Social Centre (CDS)	3,069	0.55	–2.65	0	±0
The Ecologist Greens (LVE)	2,447	0.44	New	0	±0
Basque Country Greens (EHB)	2,415	0.43	New	0	±0
Ruiz-Mateos Group–European Democratic Alliance (ARM–ADE)	2,070	0.37	New	0	±0
Workers' Socialist Party (PST)	1,878	0.32	+0.01	0	±0
Communist Party of the Basque Country People (PCPE/EHAC)	599	0.11	New	0	±0
Humanist Party (PH)	441	0.08	–0.05	0	±0
Alliance for the Republic (AxR)^{2}	347	0.06	–0.05	0	±0
Revolutionary Communist League–Communist Movement (LKI–EMK)	326	0.06	New	0	±0
Communist Party of Spain (Marxist–Leninist) (PCE (m–l))^{3}	272	0.05	–0.02	0	±0
Alavese Unity (UA)	183	0.03	New	0	±0
Blank ballots	3,679	0.66	+0.22		
Total	561,239			25	±0
Valid votes	561,239	99.48	–0.03		
Invalid votes	2,923	0.52	+0.03		
Votes cast / turnout	564,162	60.53	–9.24		
Abstentions	367,834	39.47	+9.24		
Registered voters	931,996				
Sources
Footnotes: ^{1} People's Party results are compared to People's Alliance–Liberal Party totals in the 1986 election.; ^{2} Alliance for the Republic results are compared to Internationalist Socialist Workers' Party totals in the 1986 election.; ^{3} Communist Party of Spain (Marxist–Leninist) results are compared to Republican Popular Unity totals in the 1986 election.

=== 1986 ===
Summary of the 30 November 1986 Basque Parliament election results in Biscay
Parties and alliances	Popular vote			Seats	
Parties and alliances	Votes	%	±pp	Total	+/−
Basque Nationalist Party (EAJ/PNV)	183,766	28.81	–14.94	8	–4
Socialist Party of the Basque Country (PSE–PSOE)	143,387	22.48	–0.59	6	±0
Popular Unity (HB)	101,733	15.95	+3.02	4	+1
Basque Solidarity (EA)	74,921	11.75	New	3	+3
Basque Country Left (EE)	65,116	10.21	+2.78	3	+1
People's Alliance–Liberal Party (AP–PL)^{1}	32,764	5.14	–4.25	1	–1
Democratic and Social Centre (CDS)	20,387	3.20	New	0	±0
United Left (IU/EB)	5,055	0.79	New	0	±0
Communist Party of the Basque Country (PCE/EPK)	3,895	0.61	–1.16	0	±0
Workers' Socialist Party (PST)	1,994	0.31	–0.05	0	±0
Humanist Party (PH)	856	0.13	New	0	±0
Internationalist Socialist Workers' Party (POSI)	683	0.11	New	0	±0
Republican Popular Unity (UPR)^{2}	414	0.07	–0.06	0	±0
Blank ballots^{3}	2,798	0.44	±0.00		
Total	637,769			25	±0
Valid votes	637,769	99.51	+0.05		
Invalid votes	3,169	0.49	–0.05		
Votes cast / turnout	640,938	69.77	+1.51		
Abstentions	277,747	30.23	–1.51		
Registered voters	918,685				
Sources
Footnotes: ^{1} People's Alliance–Liberal Party results are compared to People's Coalition totals in the 1984 election.; ^{2} Republican Popular Unity results are compared to Communist Party of Spain (Marxist–Leninist) totals in the 1984 election.; ^{3} The 1983 electoral law provided that blank ballots would not count as valid votes for the application of the 5 percent threshold in each district. However, this rule was not determinant in excluding any party from seat distribution during its time of application (the 1984 and 1986 elections). As a result, and for comparison purposes, blank ballots are shown here included within valid votes.

=== 1984 ===
Summary of the 26 February 1984 Basque Parliament election results in Biscay
Parties and alliances	Popular vote			Seats	
Parties and alliances	Votes	%	±pp	Total	+/−
Basque Nationalist Party (EAJ/PNV)	261,911	43.75	+3.78	12	+3
Socialist Party of the Basque Country (PSE–PSOE)	138,093	23.07	+8.64	6	+3
Popular Unity (HB)	77,407	12.93	–3.42	3	–1
People's Coalition (AP–PDP–UL)^{1}	56,207	9.39	+3.62	2	+1
Basque Country Left (EE)	44,500	7.43	–0.35	2	+1
Communist Party of the Basque Country (PCE/EPK)	10,611	1.77	–3.01	0	–1
Neighborhood Labor (Auzolan)^{2}	4,357	0.73	–0.88	0	±0
Workers' Socialist Party (PST)	2,173	0.36	–0.05	0	±0
Communist Party of Spain (Marxist–Leninist) (PCE (m–l))	792	0.13	New	0	±0
Union of the Democratic Centre (UCD)	n/a	n/a	–6.75	0	–1
Blank ballots^{3}	2,641	0.44	+0.02		
Total	598,692			25	+5
Valid votes	598,692	99.46	+0.54		
Invalid votes	3,235	0.54	–0.54		
Votes cast / turnout	601,927	68.26	+7.26		
Abstentions	279,916	31.74	–7.26		
Registered voters	881,843				
Sources
Footnotes: ^{1} People's Coalition results are compared to People's Alliance totals in the 1980 election.; ^{2} Auzolan results are compared to the combined totals of Communist Movement of the Basque Country and Revolutionary Communist League in the 1980 election.; ^{3} The 1983 electoral law provided that blank ballots would not count as valid votes for the application of the 5 percent threshold in each district. However, this rule was not determinant in excluding any party from seat distribution during its time of application (the 1984 and 1986 elections). As a result, and for comparison purposes, blank ballots are shown here included within valid votes.

=== 1980 ===
Summary of the 9 March 1980 Basque Parliament election results in Biscay
Parties and alliances	Popular vote			Seats	
Parties and alliances	Votes	%	±pp	Total	+/−
Basque Nationalist Party (EAJ/PNV)	206,051	39.97	n/a	9	n/a
People's Unity (HB)	84,273	16.35	n/a	4	n/a
Socialist Party of the Basque Country (PSE–PSOE)	74,379	14.43	n/a	3	n/a
Basque Country Left (EE)	40,085	7.78	n/a	1	n/a
Union of the Democratic Centre (UCD)	34,781	6.75	n/a	1	n/a
People's Alliance (AP)	29,747	5.77	n/a	1	n/a
Communist Party of the Basque Country (PCE/EPK)	24,660	4.78	n/a	1	n/a
Communist Movement of the Basque Country (EMK/MCE)	5,654	1.10	n/a	0	n/a
Spanish Socialist Workers' Party (historical) (PSOEh)	2,760	0.54	n/a	0	n/a
Revolutionary Communist League (LKI/LCR)	2,652	0.51	n/a	0	n/a
Workers' Socialist Party (PST)	2,099	0.41	n/a	0	n/a
Spanish Phalanx of the CNSO (FE–JONS)	1,466	0.28	n/a	0	n/a
Workers' Party of the Basque Country (ORT–PTE)	1,404	0.27	n/a	0	n/a
Basque Socialists' Unity Force (ESEI)	1,343	0.26	n/a	0	n/a
Communist Unity (UC)	1,340	0.26	n/a	0	n/a
Carlist Party (EKA/PC)	684	0.13	n/a	0	n/a
Blank ballots	2,164	0.42	n/a		
Total	515,542			20	n/a
Valid votes	515,542	98.92	n/a		
Invalid votes	5,652	1.08	n/a		
Votes cast / turnout	521,194	61.00	n/a		
Abstentions	333,173	39.00	n/a		
Registered voters	854,367				
