= Carlos Iturgaiz =

Spanish politician

Carlos José Iturgaiz Angulo MEP
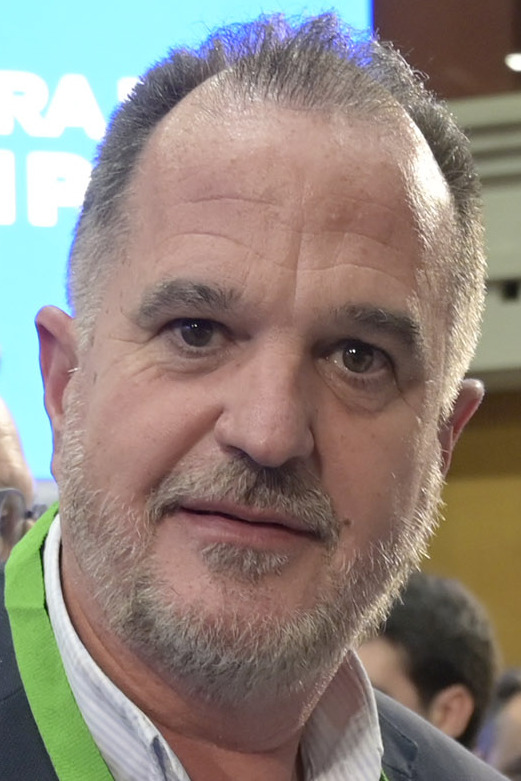

Member of the European Parliament for Spain
- In office 6 November 2014 – 1 July 2019
- In office 13 June 2004 – 30 June 2014

Member of the Basque Parliament for Biscay
- Incumbent
- Assumed office 3 August 2020
- In office 30 November 1994 – 30 June 2004

Member of the Biscay Provincial Council
- In office 17 June 1991 – 8 October 1993

City councillor of Bilbao
- In office 20 June 1991 – 17 June 1995

Personal details
- Born: 20 October 1965 (age 60) Santurtzi, Biscay, Spain
- Party: People's Party
- Profession: Teacher

Carlos José Iturgaiz Angulo (born 20 October 1965 in Santurce, Biscay) is a Spanish politician of the People's Party (PP) who served as a Member of the European Parliament from 2004 until 2019.

== Education ==
He first studied extinct languages and then became a qualified accordion teacher.

== Member of the European Parliament ==
Iturgaiz served as vice-chairman of the Committee on Petitions (PETI) and of the delegation for relations with the countries of Central America from 2009. He was chairman of the delegation for relations with the Maghreb countries and the Arab Maghreb Union (including Libya) from 27 February 2008 until 13 July 2009.

From 16 September 2009, Iturgaiz was a substitute member of the delegation for relations with the countries of Southeast Asia and the ASEAN (Association of Southeast Asian Nations). From 2010, he was as substitute member of the Committee on Fisheries.

Iturgaiz failed to secure his re-election in the 2014 European elections. However, when his party colleague Miguel Arias Cañete was nominated as European Commissioner in late 2014, Iturgaiz took his seat in the European Parliament. He has since been a member of the Committee on Fisheries.

In September 2018, Iturgaiz voted against the European Union triggering article 7 procedure against Hungary, due to the country's government posing a “systematic threat” to democracy and the rule of law.

== Political mandates ==
=== Local mandates ===
- 2020- : Member of the Basque Parliament
- 1994–2004: Member of the Basque Parliament
- 1991–1993: Member of the Biscay Provincial Council
- 1991–1995: Member of Bilbao City council

=== Mandates inside the PP ===
- 1993–1996: Secretary-General of the PP in the Basque Country
- 1996–2004: Chairman of the PP in the Basque Country

=== European mandates ===
- 2004-2009: Member of the European Parliament, European People's Party (Christian Democrats) and European Democrats
- Since 2009: Member of the European Parliament, European People's Party (Christian Democrats)

== See also ==
- 2004 European Parliament election in Spain
