= Basque National Liberation Movement =

Basque nationalist movement

The Basque National Liberation Movement (Spanish: Movimiento de Liberación Nacional Vasco, MLNV; Basque: Euskal Nazio Askapenerako Mugimendua, "ENAM") was an umbrella term that comprised all social, political and armed organizations orbiting around the ideas of the illegal armed organisation Euskadi Ta Askatasuna (ETA), proscribed internationally as a terrorist organisation.

== Definitions ==
There are multiple definitions of the term. In the 1980s, 1990s, and particularly in the early 2000s, it was understood in a wider sense, as a synonym for the Basque Patriotic (Abertzale) Left, which pursues the same political goals to ETA, namely Basque independence and a socialist state. A narrower definition comprises ETA and those social and political organizations which are subservient or under the political influence of this organization. The narrower definition would exclude recently founded legal parties such as Amaiur, Bildu and Sortu which have renounced ETA's methods and publicly distanced themselves from this organization. These parties have filled the void left by political parties Herri Batasuna and Euskal Herritarrok among others, when they were included in the United States' list of terrorist organizations and formally dissolved by the Spanish Supreme Court in 2003. As a result, for much of the 2000s, the Abertzale left was left without political representation and it was during this period when the wider definition of MNLV was most applicable. The bulk of MLNV's constituency, political and social leaders have transitioned to the aforementioned legal parties, only those remaining organizations and individuals supporting, collaborating or subservient to ETA would be presently considered to belong to the MNLV. This is the case even though one of the Abertzale left's major causes is the rights of ETA prisoners, particularly their re-location to prisons to the Basque country. However, its political direction has been criticized by more hard-line members of this political space who demand a return to a more combative approach with the Spanish state.

== Related organisations ==
Some of the most relevant organizations that can be considered to have formed part of this political current are listed below.

=== Armed organizations ===
- ETA militarra
- ETA politiko-militarra (disbanded in 1984),
- Iparretarrak, active in France between 1973 and 2000,
- Irrintzi, acting in the French Basque Country between 2006 and 2009,
- Hordago, active in France in the 1980s,
- Euskal Zuzentasuna, active in France between 1977 and 1979.
- Iraultza, active between 1981 - 1991

=== Political parties ===
- Eusko Abertzale Ekintza, EAE-ANV (Basque Nationalist Action, integrated successively in the different electoral fronts of the MLNV. In February 2008, after a legal process, a Spanish court declared EAE-ANV illegal on charges of being a part of ETA.
- Herri Alderdi Sozialista Iraultzailea, HASI (People's Socialist Revolutionary Party, illegal, always run in the successive MLNV fronts until the formation of Batasuna), it was considered the political arm of ETA
- Herri Batasuna, HB (Popular Unity, an electoral coalition formed by both parties and independents)
- Euskal Herritarrok, EH ("We Basque Citizens") was the moniker under which the coalition previously known as Herri Batasuna took part in elections in 1998 and 1999.
- Batasuna ("Unity" in Basque language) Political party outlawed in Spain in 2003 after ties with ETA were legally proved; this has not affected its French branch.
- Euskal Herrialdeetako Alderdi Komunista, EHAK-PCTV ("Communist Party of the Basque Homelands") had been a tiny a political party which came to be known to the public when it announced in 2005 that it would assume Batasuna's guidelines after the latter was banned in Spain according to the Ley de Partidos.
- Herritarren Zerrenda (HZ, List of Fellow Citizens) is a Basque nationalist political party in Spain and France, created in 2004 to run in the European Parliament election, it was outlawed in Spain but not in France.
- Autodeterminaziorako Bilgunea (AuB, Gathering for Self-determination) another Basque nationalist political party in Spain, created in 2004 to run in the European Parliament election, but it was outlawed.
- Askatasuna (Freedom) is a Basque political party registered on 31 August 1998 and outlawed on 8 February 2009 for proven ties with ETA.
- D3M Demokrazia Hiru Milioi (Spanish: Democracia Tres Millones; D3M; also called Demokrazia 3,000,000) is an electoral platform which was formed to participate in the 2009 Basque regional election. It was declared illegal on 8 February 2009 for the same reason as Askatasuna.

=== Other relevant organizations ===
- Langile Abertzaleen Batzordeak (LAB) (Nationalist Workers' Committees) a legal trade union.
- Jarrai (In English, "Follow", a youth organization), became Haika and later Segi, all of them were declared illegal in 2006 after Spanish tribunals considered them part of ETA.
- Koordinadora Abertzale Sozialista (KAS), for a long time an actual political organization that enveloped most of the entities mentioned in this article. Its poorly known KAS Platform was the political manifesto of the MLNV in the 1980s.
