= 2009 Basque regional election =

Election in the Spanish region of the Basque Country

- 1 March 2009

All 75 seats in the Basque Parliament 38 seats needed for a majority
- Opinion polls
- Registered: 1,776,059 ▼1.3%
- Turnout: 1,148,697 (64.7%) ▼3.3 pp
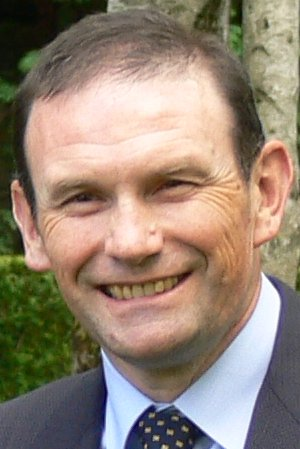

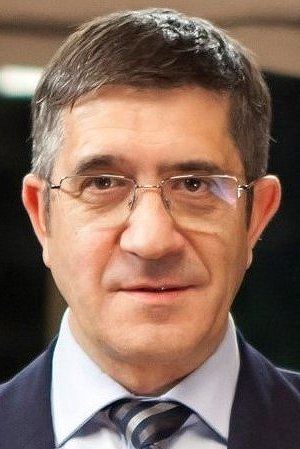

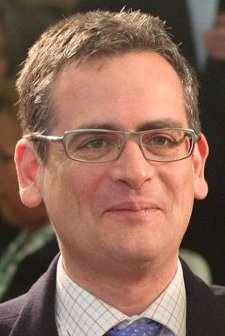

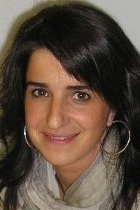

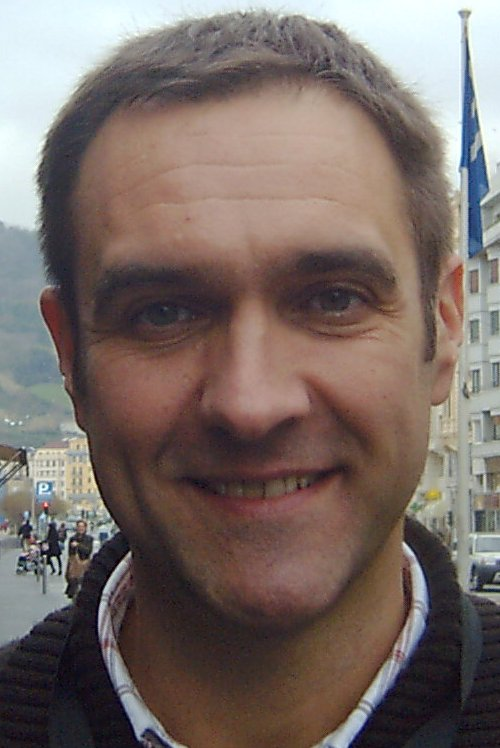

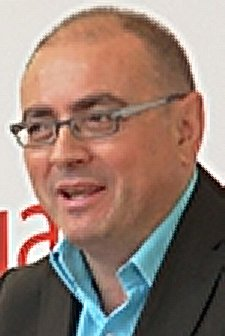
	First party	Second party	Third party
Leader	Juan José Ibarretxe	Patxi López	Antonio Basagoiti
Party	EAJ/PNV	PSE–EE (PSOE)	PP
Leader since	31 January 1998	23 March 2002	12 July 2008
Leader's seat	Álava	Biscay	Biscay
Last election	22 seats (PNV–EA) (Note: Within the PNV–EA alliance in the 2005 election: EAJ/PNV (22 seats) and EA (7 seats).)	18 seats, 22.5%	15 seats, 17.3%
Seats won	30	25	13
Seat change	▲8	▲7	▼2
Popular vote	399,600	318,112	146,148
Percentage	38.1%	30.4%	13.9%
Swing	n/a	▲7.9 pp	▼3.4 pp
	Fourth party	Fifth party	Sixth party
Leader	Aintzane Ezenarro	Unai Ziarreta	Javier Madrazo
Party	Aralar	EA	EB–B
Leader since	14 November 2004	16 December 2007	14 May 1994
Leader's seat	Guipúzcoa	Biscay (lost)	Biscay (lost)
Last election	1 seat, 2.3%	7 seats (PNV–EA)	3 seats, 5.3%
Seats won	4	1	1
Seat change	▲3	▼6	▼2
Popular vote	62,514	38,198	36,373
Percentage	6.0%	3.6%	3.5%
Swing	▲3.7 pp	n/a	▼1.8 pp
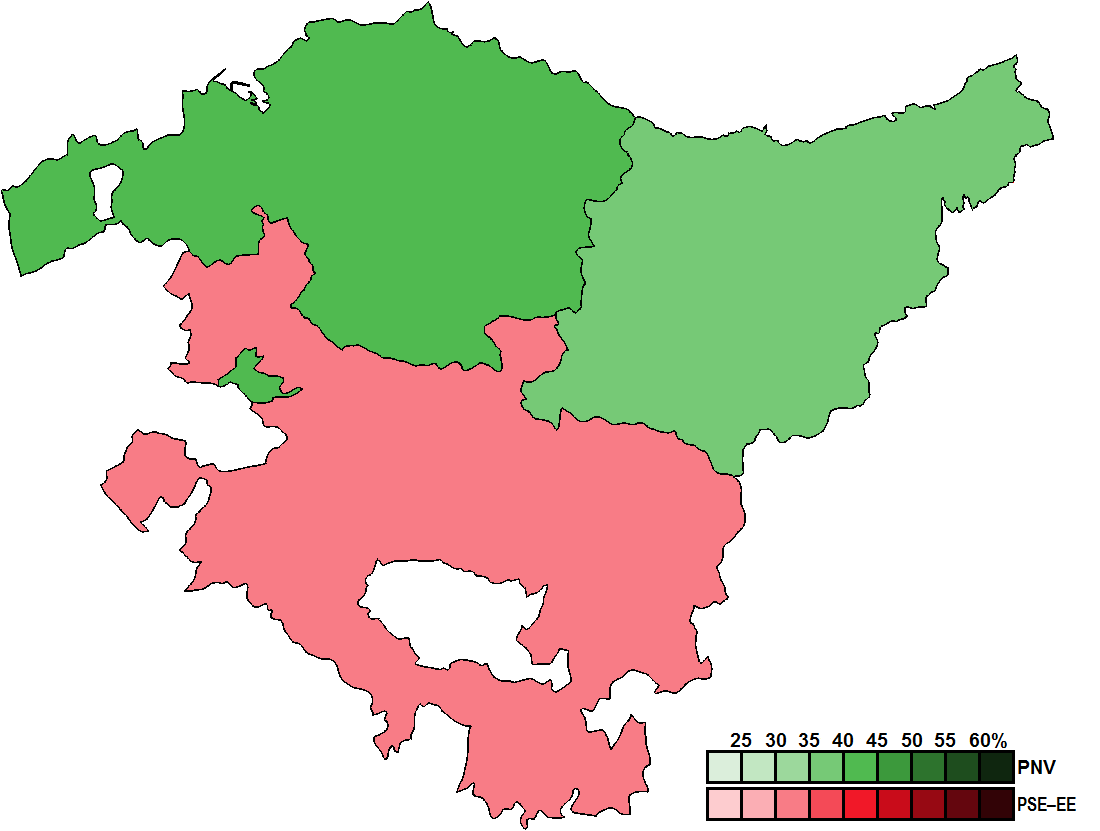
Lehendakari before election
Juan José Ibarretxe
EAJ/PNV
Lehendakari after election
Patxi López
PSE–EE (PSOE)

A regional election was held in the Basque Country on 1 March 2009 to elect the 9th Parliament of the autonomous community. All 75 seats in the Parliament were up for election. It was held concurrently with a regional election in Galicia. It would be the first time that the elections for two of the Spanish "historical regions"—namely, those comprising Andalusia, Catalonia, Galicia and the Basque Country itself—were held simultaneously. This would evolve into an unwritten convention in subsequent years, with Basque and Galician elections being held concurrently in 2012, 2016 and 2020.

The 2009 Basque election was the first one to be held without any major electoral candidacy from the abertzale left, after their previous iterations—the Communist Party of the Basque Homelands (PCTV/EHAK) and Basque Nationalist Action (ANV)—had been outlawed in September 2008 because of their reported ties to ETA and the outlawed Batasuna party. In early February 2009, two political groupings formed by abertzale left members to contest the election, Demokrazia Hiru Milioi (D3M) and Askatasuna ("Freedom"), were barred from contesting the election by both the Supreme Court and the Constitutional Court. In response, the abertzale left asked their voters to cast invalid ballots, both in protest to the court rulings and seeking to prevent tactical voting in favour of either Lehendakari Juan José Ibarretxe's Basque Nationalist Party (PNV) or Eusko Alkartasuna (EA).

The election resulted in an upset, as Basque nationalist parties lost their parliamentary majority for the first time in 30 years, paving the way for a non-PNV led government. The Socialist Party of the Basque Country–Basque Country Left (PSE–EE) under Patxi López gained seven seats to command a 25-strong caucus, the best historical showing of the party in a Basque regional election. The People's Party (PP), which had switched leaders less than a year before the election as former leader María San Gil quit over disagreements with the national leadership of Mariano Rajoy, had a net loss of two seats from 2005. The new Union, Progress and Democracy (UPyD) party, founded in 2007 by former PSOE member and regional minister Rosa Díez was able to achieve a breakthrough in Álava and have its regional candidate Gorka Maneiro elected. Meanwhile, PNV's previous coalition partners, Eusko Alkartasuna (EA) and Ezker Batua (EB), suffered a harsh electoral downturn with both their leaders losing their seats and resigning in the aftermath of the election.

The PSE formed a minority government with López as the first non-PNV lehendakari since 1979 through a confidence and supply agreement with the PP. While both parties had established an uneasy alliance in the Basque Country since the late 1990s despite their overall national rivalry, this would constitute the most relevant agreement reached between both parties at any level of administration.

== Background ==
The Ibarretxe Plan, a major proposal by Lehendakari Juan José Ibarretxe to reform the 1979 Basque Statute of Autonomy and turn the region into an associated state to Spain as a way to ending the ongoing conflict with the paramilitary ETA group, was brought to a standstill following its parliamentary defeat in a vote in the Congress of Deputies on 1 February 2005 and the subsequent electoral setback of Ibarretxe's coalition in the April 2005 regional election. On 22 March 2006, ETA declared a "permanent ceasefire" to allow for a peace process to ensue with the Spanish government under then-Prime Minister José Luis Rodríguez Zapatero, but peace talks terminated as a result of the 2006 Madrid–Barajas Airport bombing on 30 December.

Later into the legislature on 28 September 2007, Ibarretxe attempted to revive his statute reform plan by announcing a new "right to decide roadmap" which provided for a referendum on the proposal being held by 25 October 2008, whether it was in agreement with the Spanish government or without it. The law establishing the legal framework allowing the Basque government to hold the vote was approved by the Basque Parliament in June 2008, but was subsequently suspended and overturned by the Constitutional Court, which ended up ruling that the law and the proposed referendum were unconstitutional.

On 31 August 2006, the leadership of Eusko Alkartasuna (EA) had voted for terminating their electoral alliance with the Basque Nationalist Party (PNV) ahead of the 2007 foral and local elections, after seven years of collaboration; on 10 November 2008, the decision was made irreversible after EA announced its maintainment ahead of the incoming 2009 regional election. The 2007 elections had seen strong gains for the Socialist Party of the Basque Country–Basque Country Left (PSE–EE) and a decline for the parties supporting Ibarretxe's government, PNV, EA and Ezker Batua (EB), a situation confirmed one year later in the 2008 Spanish general election in the region as the PSE–EE emerged as the most voted party with 38.1% and 9 out of 18 Congress seats.

Concurrently, and in application of the 2002 Law of Political Parties—which allowed the outlawing of parties "whose activity violates democratic principles, particularly when it seeks to deteriorate or destroy the regime of freedoms or prevent or eliminate the democratic system by promoting, justifying or exculpating attacks on the life or integrity of people, legitimizing violence as a method to achieve political objectives or politically supporting the action of terrorist organizations to achieve their purposes of subverting the constitutional order"—the Supreme Court and the Constitutional Court barred several parties from contesting elections because of their reported ties to ETA and the outlawed Batasuna party; namely, the Communist Party of the Basque Homelands (PCTV/EHAK), Basque Nationalist Action (ANV), several groupings created specifically to contest the 2007 local elections (such as Abertzale Sozialisten Batasuna and Abertzale Sozialistak) or the 2009 regional election (Demokrazia Hiru Milioi and Askatasuna).

== Overview ==
Under the 1979 Statute of Autonomy, the Basque Parliament was the unicameral legislature of the Basque Autonomous Community, having legislative power in devolved matters, as well as the ability to grant or withdraw confidence from a lehendakari. The electoral and procedural rules were supplemented by national law provisions.

=== Date ===
The term of the Basque Parliament expired four years after the date of its previous election, unless it was dissolved earlier. The election decree was required to be issued no later than 25 days before the scheduled expiration date of parliament and published on the following day in the Official Gazette of the Basque Country (BOPV), with election day taking place 54 days after the decree's publication. The previous election was held on 17 April 2005, which meant that the chamber's term would have expired on 17 April 2009. The election decree was required to be published in the BOPV no later than 24 March 2009, setting the latest possible date for election day on 17 May 2009.

The lehendakari had the prerogative to dissolve the Basque Parliament at any given time and call a snap election, provided that no motion of no confidence was in process. In the event of an investiture process failing to elect a lehendakari within a 60-day period from the Parliament's reconvening, the chamber was to be automatically dissolved and a fresh election called.

Lehendakari Ibarretxe had been scheduled to announce a snap election for autumn 2008 following his expected failure in holding a referendum on the Basque Country's political status for 25 October 2008, which was averted by the Spanish government. The electoral defeat of the Basque Nationalist Party (PNV) in the 2008 Spanish general election in the region and internal opposition from the PNV leadership to an immediate election delayed the scheduled snap vote to early 2009. Finally on 3 January 2009, Ibarretxe took advantage of Galician president Emilio Pérez Touriño's previous announcement of a Galician election for 1 March to call the Basque election simultaneously, a move which was interpreted by the media and by political parties as intending to caught his political rivals by surprise (particularly, the Spanish Socialist Workers' Party (PSOE) and the People's Party (PP), by forcing them to run two simultaneous election campaigns).

The Basque Parliament was officially dissolved on 6 January 2009 with the publication of the corresponding decree in the BOPV, setting election day for 1 March.

=== Electoral system ===
Voting for the Parliament was based on universal suffrage, comprising all Spanish nationals over 18 years of age, registered in the Basque Country and with full political rights, provided that they had not been deprived of the right to vote by a final sentence, nor were legally incapacitated.

The Basque Parliament had 75 seats. All were elected in three multi-member constituencies—corresponding to the provinces of Álava, Biscay and Guipúzcoa, each of which was assigned a fixed number of 25 seats to provide for an equal parliamentary representation of the three provinces—using the D'Hondt method and closed-list proportional voting, with a three percent-threshold of valid votes (including blank ballots) in each constituency. The use of this electoral method resulted in a higher effective threshold depending on district magnitude and vote distribution.

The law did not provide for by-elections to fill vacant seats; instead, any vacancies arising after the proclamation of candidates and during the legislative term were filled by the next candidates on the party lists or, when required, by designated substitutes.

=== Outgoing parliament ===
The table below shows the composition of the parliamentary groups in the chamber at the time of dissolution.

Parliamentary composition in January 2009
Groups	Parties	Legislators	
Groups	Parties	Seats	Total
Basque Nationalists Parliamentary Group	EAJ/PNV	22	22
Basque Socialists Parliamentary Group	PSE–EE (PSOE)	18	18
Basque People's Parliamentary Group	PP	15	15
Abertzale Left Parliamentary Group	PCTV/EHAK	9	9
Basque Solidarity Parliamentary Group	EA	7	7
Mixed Group	EB–B	3	4
Mixed Group	Aralar	1	4

== Parties and candidates ==
The electoral law allowed for parties and federations registered in the interior ministry, alliances and groupings of electors to present lists of candidates. Parties and federations intending to form an alliance were required to inform the relevant electoral commission within 10 days of the election call, whereas groupings of electors needed to secure the signature of at least one percent of the electorate in the constituencies for which they sought election, disallowing electors from signing for more than one list. Amendments in 2007 required a balanced composition of men and women in the electoral lists, so that candidates of either sex made up at least 40 percent of the total composition.

Below is a list of the main parties and alliances which contested the election:

Candidacy	Parties and alliances	Leading candidate	Ideology	Previous result		Gov.	Ref.
Candidacy	Parties and alliances	Leading candidate	Ideology	Vote %	Seats	Gov.	Ref.
EAJ/PNV	List: Basque Nationalist Party (EAJ/PNV)	Juan José Ibarretxe	Basque nationalism Christian democracy Conservative liberalism	38.4% (Note: Results for PNV–EA in the 2005 election.)	29	Yes	
EA	List: Eusko Alkartasuna (EA)	Unai Ziarreta	Basque nationalism Social democracy	38.4%	29	Yes	
PSE–EE (PSOE)	List: Socialist Party of the Basque Country–Basque Country Left (PSE–EE (PSOE))	Patxi López	Social democracy	22.5%	18	No	
PP	List: People's Party (PP)	Antonio Basagoiti	Conservatism; Christian democracy	17.3%	15	No	
EB–B	List: United Left–Greens (EB–B)	Javier Madrazo	Eco-socialism; Social democracy Democratic socialism	5.3%	3	Yes	
Aralar	List: Aralar (Aralar)	Aintzane Ezenarro	Basque independence Left-wing nationalism Democratic socialism	2.3%	1	No	
UPyD	List: Union, Progress and Democracy (UPyD)	Gorka Maneiro	Social liberalism Radical centrism	Did not contest		No	

== Opinion polls ==
The tables below list opinion polling results in reverse chronological order, showing the most recent first and using the dates when the survey fieldwork was done, as opposed to the date of publication. Where the fieldwork dates are unknown, the date of publication is given instead. The highest percentage figure in each polling survey is displayed with its background shaded in the leading party's colour. If a tie ensues, this is applied to the figures with the highest percentages. The "Lead" column on the right shows the percentage-point difference between the parties with the highest percentages in a poll.

=== Voting intention estimates ===
The table below lists weighted voting intention estimates. Refusals are generally excluded from the party vote percentages, while question wording and the treatment of "don't know" responses and those not intending to vote may vary between polling organisations. When available, seat projections determined by the polling organisations are displayed below (or in place of) the percentages in a smaller font; 38 seats were required for an absolute majority in the Basque Parliament.

Color key:

Exit poll

Polling firm/Commissioner	Fieldwork date	Sample size	Turnout	PNV	PSE–EE (PSOE)	PP	PCTV/EHAK	EB–B	Aralar	EA	UPyD	Lead
2009 regional election	1 Mar 2009	—N/a	64.5	38.1; 30	30.4; 25	13.9; 13	–	3.5; 1	6.0; 4	3.6; 1	2.1; 1	7.7
Ipsos/Popular TV	1 Mar 2009	?	?	? 29/32	? 25/28	? 9/10	–	? 2/3	? 3/4	? 2/3	? 0/1	?
Ipsos/EITB	1 Mar 2009	17,250	65.7	38.2; 30/32	31.5; 26/28	11.4; 9/10	–	? 0/3	? 2/4	? 1/3	2.0; 0/1	6.7
TNS Demoscopia/Antena 3	1 Mar 2009	?	?	? 30/32	? 26/28	? 9/10	–	? 2/3	? 3/4	? 2/3	? 0/1	?
Ilargi Consulting/Euskaldemoskopia	20 Feb 2009	2,568	74.0	? 29/30	? 26/27	? 10/11	(11.5)	? 3	? 2	? 2	? 1/2	?
Celeste-Tel/Terra	20 Feb 2009	?	?	34.9	28.5	14.9	9.5	–	–	–	–	6.4
Ilargi Consulting/Euskaldemoskopia	19 Feb 2009	400	75.8	? 31	? 24	? 10	(11.0)	? 3	? 2	? 2	? 3	?
DYM/ABC	16–19 Feb 2009	769	?	37.6; 30	31.9; 25/26	15.6; 13	–	5.8; 3	3.6; 2/3	1.3; 0/1	2.8; 1	5.7
Sigma Dos/El Mundo	13–19 Feb 2009	1,050	?	36.2; 27/29	28.4; 22/25	15.1; 12/14	–	5.2; 3	3.5; 2	5.7; 3	3.9; 2	7.8
Obradoiro de Socioloxía/Público	12–19 Feb 2009	?	?	34.1; 26/28	29.1; 23/25	10.9; 9/11	–	6.0; 4	8.4; 6	5.0; 3/4	3.1; 1/3	5.0
Ilargi Consulting/Euskaldemoskopia	18 Feb 2009	400	77.9	? 31	? 25	? 11	(11.5)	? 3	? 2	? 2	? 1	?
Metroscopia/El País	16–18 Feb 2009	1,200	?	34.5; 27	30.2; 26	15.0; 13/14	–	5.2; 3	4.1; 2	4.7; 3	1.9; 0/1	4.3
TNS Demoscopia/Antena 3	16–18 Feb 2009	?	64	33.0; 25/27	27.4; 23/25	15.0; 13/15	–	5.0; 3	5.5; 4/5	5.1; 2/4	1.7; 0/1	5.6
CIES/Deia	10–18 Feb 2009	2,400	?	36.6; 28/29	30.0; 24/25	14.1; 11/12	–	4.7; 3	6.8; 4/5	4.4; 1/3	2.8; 1	6.6
Ilargi Consulting/Euskaldemoskopia	17 Feb 2009	400	78.2	? 31	? 24	? 12	(11.0)	? 3	? 1	? 2	? 2	?
Ilargi Consulting/Euskaldemoskopia	16 Feb 2009	400	77.3	? 29	? 26	? 10	(11.5)	? 3	? 2	? 2	? 3	?
Ikerfel/Vocento	13–16 Feb 2009	3,000	?	36.5; 27/29	32.2; 26/28	13.9; 11/12	–	4.5; 2/3	5.1; 3	4.6; 2/4	2.5; 1	4.3
Noxa/La Vanguardia	11–16 Feb 2009	1,000	?	39.4; 30/31	31.7; 26/27	11.2; 10/11	–	4.2; 3	4.8; 2	4.4; 2	2.5; 0/1	7.7
Ikertalde/GPS	5–16 Feb 2009	3,332	66.0	34.0; 26/27	31.5; 26/27	15.4; 13	–	5.5; 3	4.2; 2	6.0; 4	1.6; 0	3.5
Ilargi Consulting/Euskaldemoskopia	15 Feb 2009	400	78.5	? 27	? 27	? 11	(10.5)	? 3	? 3	? 2	? 2	Tie
Ilargi Consulting/Euskaldemoskopia	14 Feb 2009	400	76.5	? 29	? 25	? 11	(8.5)	? 2	? 3	? 2	? 3	?
Opina/Cadena SER	13 Feb 2009	?	?	36.0; 29	31.0; 26/27	15.0; 12	–	5.0; 4	2.9; 1/2	3.0; 2	–	5.0
Ilargi Consulting/Euskaldemoskopia	13 Feb 2009	400	?	? 30	? 24	? 11	–	? 3	? 2	? 2	? 3	?
Obradoiro de Socioloxía/Público	8 Feb 2009	?	?	32.4; 26	26.6; 23	10.8; 10	7.9; 6	4.9; 3/4	6.7; 3/4	4.6; 3	3.0; 0/1	5.8
Obradoiro de Socioloxía/Público	8 Feb 2009	?	?	35.0; 28	29.0; 25	11.7; 10	–	5.3; 4/5	7.4; 3/4	4.2; 3	3.2; 0/1	6.0
NC Report/La Razón	2–5 Feb 2009	1,000	?	37.7; 28/30	30.7; 26/27	15.8; 13/14	–	4.5; 3	2.8; 1	4.2; 1/2	3.0; 1	7.0
CIS	15 Jan–4 Feb 2009	2,460	?	35.3; 27/28	29.7; 26	13.4; 11/12	–	5.1; 3	4.3; 3	5.3; 3/4	1.9; 0/1	5.6
TNS Demoscopia/Antena 3	19–21 Jan 2009	?	?	36.0; 28/29	24.7; 20/22	15.3; 12/13	10.7; 6/8	3.9; 3	2.6; 1	3.0; 2	2.1; 0	11.3
NC Report/La Razón	5–9 Jan 2009	1,000	?	35.8; 26/29	31.6; 25/28	16.2; 14/15	–	4.7; 3	3.1; 1	5.7; 3/4	2.3; 0/1	4.2
CPS/EHU	15 Oct–7 Nov 2008	1,200	?	34.0; 26/28	31.0; 25/27	16.0; 13/15	–	5.0; 3	3.0; 1	4.0; 2/4	2.0; 0	3.0
CPS/EHU	2–20 May 2008	1,800	?	34.0; 24/27	32.0; 25/28	16.0; 13/15	–	4.0; 3	3.0; 1	5.0; 2/4	–	2.0
2008 general election	9 Mar 2008	—N/a	64.0	27.1 (20)	38.1 (33)	18.5 (16)	–	4.5 (3)	2.7 (1)	4.5 (2)	0.9 (0)	11.0
CPS/EHU	22 Oct–16 Nov 2007	1,200	?	33.5; 24/27	24.2; 20/22	15.8; 13/14	14.8; 10/12	4.6; 3	3.0; 1	4.5; 2/3	–	9.3
CPS/EHU	4–30 Jun 2007	1,200	?	32.9; 24/26	24.5; 19/22	15.5; 13/14	15.7; 10/12	4.6; 3	2.5; 1	4.6; 2/3	–	8.4
2007 foral elections	27 May 2007	—N/a	60.6	34.1 (25)	26.2 (22)	17.0 (14)	3.0 (2)	9.4 (7)		7.4 (5)	–	7.9
CPS/EHU	10 Nov–12 Dec 2006	1,200	?	33.4; 25	24.2; 18/20	15.5; 14	15.6; 11/12	5.2; 3	2.9; 1	4.3; 1/2	–	9.2
CPS/EHU	2–31 May 2006	1,800	?	34.8; 25/27	23.9; 18/19	14.6; 13/15	14.4; 11	5.3; 3	2.8; 1	4.1; 2	–	10.9
2005 regional election	17 Apr 2005	—N/a	68.0	38.4; 29	22.5; 18	17.3; 15	12.4; 9	5.3; 3	2.3; 1	(Note: Within PNV.)	–	15.9

=== Voting preferences ===
The table below lists raw, unweighted voting preferences.

Polling firm/Commissioner	Fieldwork date	Sample size	PNV	PSE–EE (PSOE)	PP	PCTV/EHAK	EB–B	Aralar	EA	UPyD	Question	X mark	Lead
2009 regional election (Note: Does not include non-resident citizens.)	1 Mar 2009	—N/a	22.3	17.8	8.2	–	2.0	3.5	2.1	1.2	—N/a	35.7	4.5
Metroscopia/El País	16–18 Feb 2009	1,200	24.6	15.7	2.8	–	3.1	3.5	2.4	1.2	40.0		8.9
CIS	15 Jan–4 Feb 2009	2,460	20.2	14.4	2.3	–	2.1	1.8	2.0	0.4	37.5	13.7	7.8
CPS/EHU	15 Oct–7 Nov 2008	1,200	25.9	17.5	3.2	6.9	4.2	1.8	3.2	0.3	–	–	8.4
CPS/EHU	2–20 May 2008	1,800	27.1	22.6	5.4	6.5	4.6	2.5	3.1	–	–	–	4.5
2008 general election	9 Mar 2008	—N/a	17.4	24.5	11.9	–	2.9	1.7	2.9	0.6	—N/a	35.1	7.1
2007 foral elections	27 May 2007	—N/a	18.2	14.0	9.1	1.6	5.0		4.0	–	—N/a	39.4	4.2
2005 regional election	17 Apr 2005	—N/a	26.3	15.5	11.9	8.5	3.7	1.6		–	—N/a	31.0	10.8

=== Victory preferences ===
The table below lists opinion polling on the victory preferences for each party in the event of a regional election taking place.

Polling firm/Commissioner	Fieldwork date	Sample size	PNV	PSE–EE (PSOE)	PP	EB–B	Aralar	EA	UPyD	Other/ None	Question	Lead
Metroscopia/El País	16–18 Feb 2009	1,200	36.0	23.0	4.0	2.0	3.0	2.0	1.0	9.0	20.0	13.0
Noxa/La Vanguardia	11–16 Feb 2009	1,000	41.0	28.0	4.0	2.0	4.0	3.0	1.0	17.0		13.0
Opina/Cadena SER	13 Feb 2009	?	34.6	26.5	6.4	–	–	–	–	15.5	17.1	8.1
CIS	15 Jan–4 Feb 2009	2,460	27.5	18.1	2.7	2.4	2.1	2.1	0.5	5.3	39.4	9.4

=== Victory likelihood ===
The table below lists opinion polling on the perceived likelihood of victory for each party in the event of a regional election taking place.

Polling firm/Commissioner	Fieldwork date	Sample size	PNV	PSE–EE (PSOE)	PP	EB–B	Aralar	EA	Other/ None	Question	Lead
Metroscopia/El País	16–18 Feb 2009	1,200	69.0	15.0	1.0	–	–	–	1.0	15.0	54.0
Opina/Cadena SER	13 Feb 2009	?	61.8	17.7	0.7	–	–	–	0.8	18.9	44.1
CIS	15 Jan–4 Feb 2009	2,460	62.0	13.5	0.3	0.1	0.0	0.1	0.4	23.7	48.5

=== Preferred Lehendakari ===
The table below lists opinion polling on leader preferences to become lehendakari.

Polling firm/Commissioner	Fieldwork date	Sample size							Other/ None/ Not care	Question	Lead
Polling firm/Commissioner	Fieldwork date	Sample size	Ibarretxe PNV	López PSE–EE	Basagoiti PP	Madrazo EB–B	Ezenarro Aralar	Ziarreta EA	Other/ None/ Not care	Question	Lead
Celeste-Tel/Terra	20 Feb 2009	?	36.5	23.8	–	–	–	–	18.8	20.9	12.7
Obradoiro de Socioloxía/Público	12–19 Feb 2009	?	42.0	21.8	5.3	–	–	–	30.9		20.2
Ikerfel/Vocento	13–16 Feb 2009	3,000	54.0	24.0	–	–	–	–	21.0	1.0	30.0
Noxa/La Vanguardia	11–16 Feb 2009	1,000	51.0	27.0	5.0	–	–	–	17.0		24.0
Opina/Cadena SER	13 Feb 2009	?	39.8	27.1	5.2	–	–	–	13.4	14.6	12.7
Obradoiro de Socioloxía/Público	8 Feb 2009	?	42.8	27.0	7.0	–	–	–	23.2		15.8
CIS	15 Jan–4 Feb 2009	2,460	30.9	16.6	2.4	1.8	1.8	1.1	17.7	27.6	14.3

=== Predicted Lehendakari ===
The table below lists opinion polling on the perceived likelihood for each leader to become lehendakari.

Polling firm/Commissioner	Fieldwork date	Sample size				Other/ None/ Not care	Question	Lead
Polling firm/Commissioner	Fieldwork date	Sample size	Ibarretxe PNV	López PSE–EE	Basagoiti PP	Other/ None/ Not care	Question	Lead
Obradoiro de Socioloxía/Público	12–19 Feb 2009	?	64.9	13.9	0.3	20.9		51.0
Opina/Cadena SER	13 Feb 2009	?	67.8	16.6	1.0	1.0	13.7	51.2
Obradoiro de Socioloxía/Público	8 Feb 2009	?	67.3	18.5	0.9	13.3		48.8

== Results ==
=== Overall ===
← Summary of the 1 March 2009 Basque Parliament election results →
Parties and alliances	Popular vote			Seats	
Parties and alliances	Votes	%	±pp	Total	+/−
Basque Nationalist Party (EAJ/PNV)^{1}	399,600	38.14	n/a	30	+8
Socialist Party of the Basque Country–Basque Country Left (PSE–EE (PSOE))	318,112	30.36	+7.85	25	+7
People's Party (PP)	146,148	13.95	−3.32	13	−2
Aralar (Aralar)	62,514	5.97	+3.66	4	+3
Basque Solidarity (EA)^{1}	38,198	3.65	n/a	1	−6
United Left–Greens (EB–B)	36,373	3.47	−1.86	1	−2
Union, Progress and Democracy (UPyD)	22,233	2.12	New	1	+1
The Greens (B/LV)	5,643	0.54	New	0	±0
For a Fairer World (PUM+J)	3,072	0.29	+0.19	0	±0
Anti-Bullfighting Party Against Mistreatment of Animals (PACMA/ZAAAA)	1,504	0.14	−0.19	0	±0
Internationalist Socialist Workers' Party (POSI)	1,178	0.11	−0.08	0	±0
Family and Life Party (PFyV)	1,052	0.10	New	0	±0
Humanist Party (PH)	418	0.04	−0.08	0	±0
Carlist Party of the Basque Country–Carlist Party (EKA–PC)	151	0.01	±0.00	0	±0
Communist Party of the Basque Homelands (PCTV/EHAK)	n/a	n/a	−12.35	0	−9
Blank ballots	11,562	1.10	+0.36		
Total	1,047,758			75	±0
Valid votes	1,047,758	91.21	−8.46		
Invalid votes	100,939	8.79	+8.46		
Votes cast / turnout	1,148,697	64.68	−3.32		
Abstentions	627,362	35.32	+3.32		
Registered voters	1,776,059				
Sources
Footnotes: ^{1} Within the Basque Nationalist Party–Basque Solidarity alliance in the 2005 election.

Popular vote
EAJ/PNV	38.14%
PSE–EE (PSOE)	30.36%
PP	13.95%
Aralar	5.97%
EA	3.65%
EB–B	3.47%
UPyD	2.12%
Others	1.24%
Blank ballots	1.10%

Seats
EAJ/PNV	40.00%
PSE–EE (PSOE)	33.33%
PP	17.33%
Aralar	5.33%
EA	1.33%
EB–B	1.33%
UPyD	1.33%

=== Distribution by constituency ===
Constituency	PNV		PSE–EE		PP		Aralar		EA		EB–B		UPyD	
Constituency	%	S	%	S	%	S	%	S	%	S	%	S	%	S
Álava	30.0	8	31.2	9	21.1	6	4.3	1	3.5	–	3.3	–	3.9	1
Biscay	41.1	12	30.2	8	13.9	4	4.2	1	2.9	–	3.4	–	1.9	–
Guipúzcoa	36.5	10	30.2	8	10.5	3	10.2	2	5.2	1	3.7	1	1.7	–
Total	38.1	30	30.4	25	13.9	13	6.0	4	3.6	1	3.4	1	2.1	1

== Aftermath ==
=== Invalid votes ===
After Demokrazia Hiru Milioi (D3M) and Askatasuna ("Freedom") were outlawed in February 2009, Basque separatists were asked to cast their vote for D3M, whose ballots would be counted as invalid. According to some sources, the pro-independence Basque left (that were formerly represented by Batasuna and later by EHAK) was surprised by the lower support of their void option. If the void votes are to be counted as the support of this option, it would have obtained the worst results in their history, having received 100,924 void votes, 50,000 less than in the previous regional election and less than half their historical top in the 1998 election.

Major electoral analysis has been performed on the results and the issue of the void votes by pro-Basque nationalist and non-Basque nationalist parties alike. It is a frequent misunderstanding that, had the votes for the illegal lists been counted as valid, they would have been entitled to seven seats. Actually, taking into account that the average of "normal" void votes (struck-out names, double-voting, etc.) in the last three Basque regional elections (1998, 2001 and 2005) was about 0.4%, and assuming that all the void votes that could not be accounted for by that statistic alone were cast for a hypothetical unitary abertzale list (instead of for two different lists, Askatasuna and D3M), those ~97,000 votes would have accounted for at most 6 seats.

=== Government formation ===
The election results saw the Basque Nationalist Party (PNV) of Lehendakari Juan José Ibarretxe securing a clear victory with 38.1% of the vote and 30 seats, but it came at the expense of Ibarretxe's erstwhile allies, Eusko Alkartasuna (EA) and Ezker Batua (EB). Together with Aralar, which had seen a remarkable rise of support in absence of electoral competition from other abertzale left parties—a result of their illegalization because of their ties with ETA and Batasuna—the parties in support of Ibarretxe could only muster 36 out of the 75 seats in the Basque Parliament, against 39 of the combined totals for the Socialist Party of the Basque Country–Basque Country Left (PSE–EE), the People's Party (PP) and Union, Progress and Democracy (UPyD), meaning that for the first time since 1979 the possibility existed for a non-PNV lehendakari to be appointed. Upon learning of the results, PP regional leader Antonio Basagoiti proclaimed his satisfaction and announced his support for Socialist Patxi López as new lehendakari, who had previously announced that he felt "legitimated to lead the change" and would be running for investiture.

As the PNV–EA–EB alliance—in government since 2001—was no longer workable, the PNV attempted to figure out a coalition agreement with the PSE to remain in power, mirroring the historical collaboration that the two parties had maintained from 1986 to 1998, and hinting at withdrawing PNV's support to Prime Minister José Luis Rodríguez Zapatero's government in the Cortes Generales if the Spanish Socialist Workers' Party (PSOE) did not back their plan. The PSE rejected supporting a new PNV administration even if Ibarretxe was replaced with a different candidate, conditioning any agreement on Patxi López becoming lehendakari, which the PNV refused. Instead, the PSE proposed the formation of a minority cabinet led by López that could be supported by the PP, ruling out a full-fledged coalition. Concurrently, the PSOE's national leadership supported López's bid and defended the PSE's autonomy to agree on any pact that their local branch deemed fit, despite the PNV's threat of withdrawing their support nationally.

Seeking to provide the new government of parliamentary stability, the PSE and the PP—which had been and still were arch-rivals at the national level—reached an unprecedented confidence and supply agreement on 30 March that would see the Basque nationalists ousted from power after 30 years of uninterrupted government. The PNV, which had dubbed any such agreement as "legitimate" but as a "fraud to the electorate" and an "act of political aggression", announced a "harsh" opposition to López's government and vowed to put forth Ibarretxe as their candidate in the investiture session, citing their "right" to head the government as the top-voted party. As part of their agreement, the PSE would support PP's Arantza Quiroga as new president of the Basque Parliament and treat the PP as their "preferred" parliamentary partner, whereas the PP would refrain from moving or supporting any vote of no confidence on the new cabinet.

López was elected as new lehendakari on a 39–35 vote in the investiture session held on 5 May 2009, garnering the additional support of the sole legislator from Union, Progress and Democracy (UPyD), and was sworn in two days later. Simultaneously, his political defeat led Ibarretxe to announce his farewell from politics altogether, a move which would allow his party to reorganize itself from opposition hands-free and, eventually, lead to the abandonment of Ibarretxe's sovereigntist plans and discourse.

Investiture
Ballot →	5 May 2009	
Required majority →	38 out of 75	
Patxi López (PSE–EE): • PSE–EE (25); • PP (13); • UPyD (1)	39 / 75	check
Juan José Ibarretxe (PNV): • PNV (30); • Aralar (4); • EA (1)	35 / 75	X mark
Abstentions/Blank ballots: • EB–B (1)	1 / 75	
Absentees	0 / 75	

== Bibliography ==
- Ley Orgánica 3/1979, de 18 de diciembre, de Estatuto de Autonomía para el País Vasco (Organic Law 3/1979). Official State Gazette (in Spanish). 18 December 1979 [version as of 22 December 1979]. BOE-A-1979-30177.
- Ley 7/1981, de 30 de junio, sobre Ley de Gobierno (Law 7/1981). Official State Gazette (in Spanish). 30 June 1981 [version as of 2 March 2005]. BOE-A-2012-5927.
- Ley Orgánica 5/1985, de 19 de junio, del Régimen Electoral General (Organic Law 5/1985). Official State Gazette (in Spanish). 19 June 1985 [version as of 22 January 2009]. BOE-A-1985-11672.
- Ley 5/1990, de 15 de junio, de Elecciones al Parlamento Vasco (Law 5/1990). Official State Gazette (in Spanish). 15 June 1990 [version as of 2 March 2005]. BOE-A-2012-2859.
- Decreto 1/2009, de 2 de enero, del Lehendakari, por el que se disuelve el Parlamento Vasco y se convocan elecciones (PDF) (Decree 1/2009). Official Gazette of the Basque Country (in Spanish). 2 January 2009.
