= 2012 Basque regional election =

Election in the Spanish region of the Basque Country

- 21 October 2012

All 75 seats in the Basque Parliament 38 seats needed for a majority
- Opinion polls
- Registered: 1,775,351 ▼0.0%
- Turnout: 1,135,568 (64.0%) ▼0.7 pp
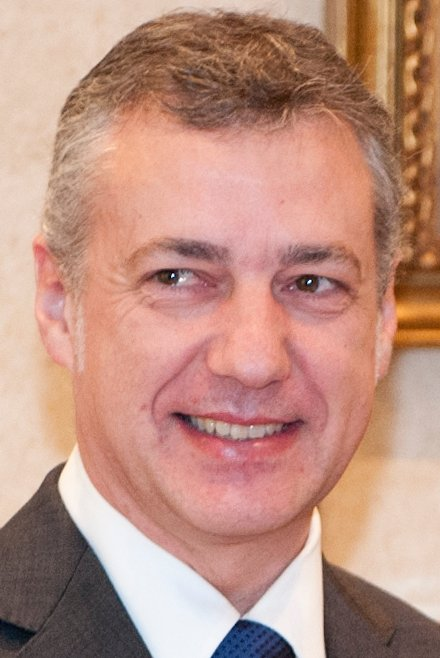

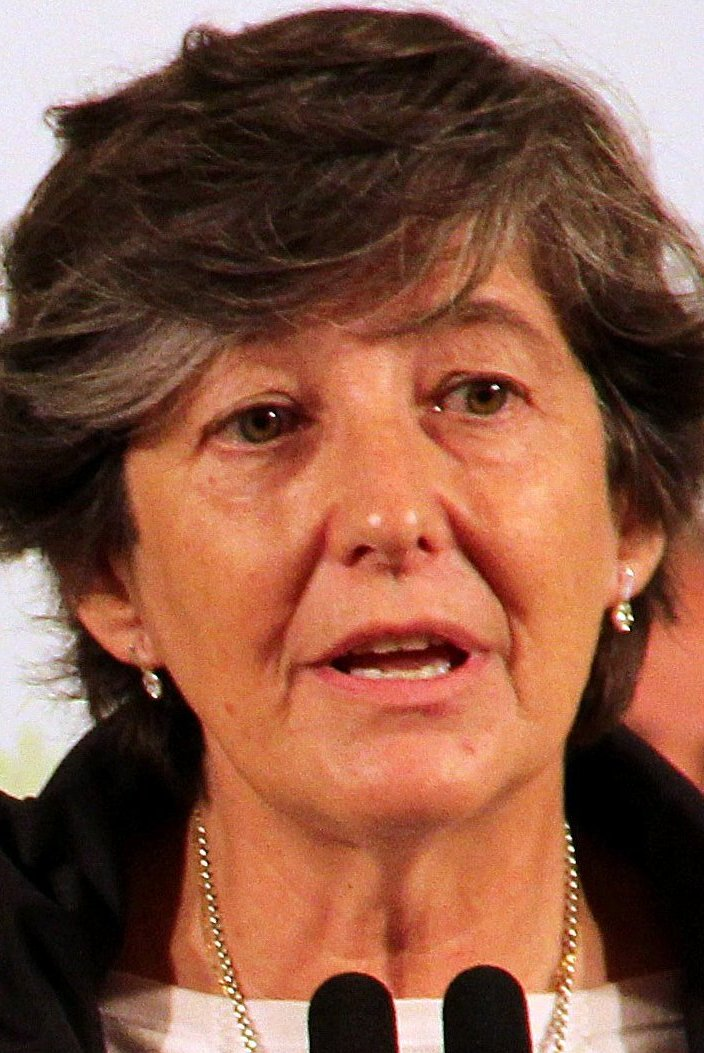

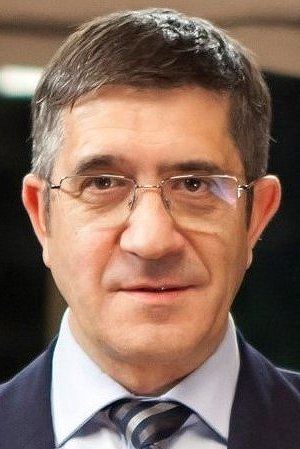

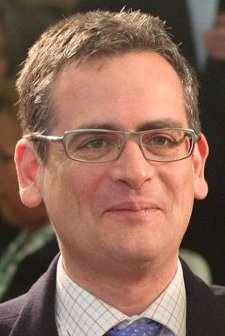

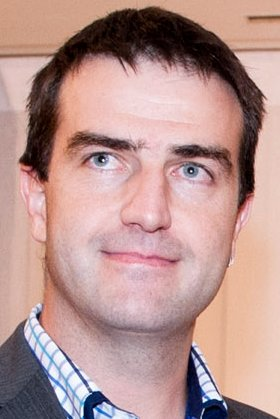
	First party	Second party	Third party
Leader	Iñigo Urkullu	Laura Mintegi	Patxi López
Party	EAJ/PNV	EH Bildu	PSE–EE (PSOE)
Leader since	2 December 2007	2 July 2012	23 March 2002
Leader's seat	Biscay	Biscay	Álava
Last election	30 seats, 38.1%	5 seats, 9.6% (Note: Results for Aralar (6.0%, 4 seats) and EA (3.6%, 1 seat) in the 2009 election.)	25 seats, 30.4%
Seats won	27	21	16
Seat change	▼3	▲16	▼9
Popular vote	384,766	277,923	212,809
Percentage	34.2%	24.7%	18.9%
Swing	▼3.9 pp	▲15.1 pp	▼11.5 pp
	Fourth party	Fifth party
Leader	Antonio Basagoiti	Gorka Maneiro
Party	PP	UPyD
Leader since	12 July 2008	2008
Leader's seat	Biscay	Álava
Last election	13 seats, 13.9%	1 seat, 2.1%
Seats won	10	1
Seat change	▼3	0
Popular vote	130,584	21,539
Percentage	11.6%	1.9%
Swing	▼2.3 pp	▼0.2 pp
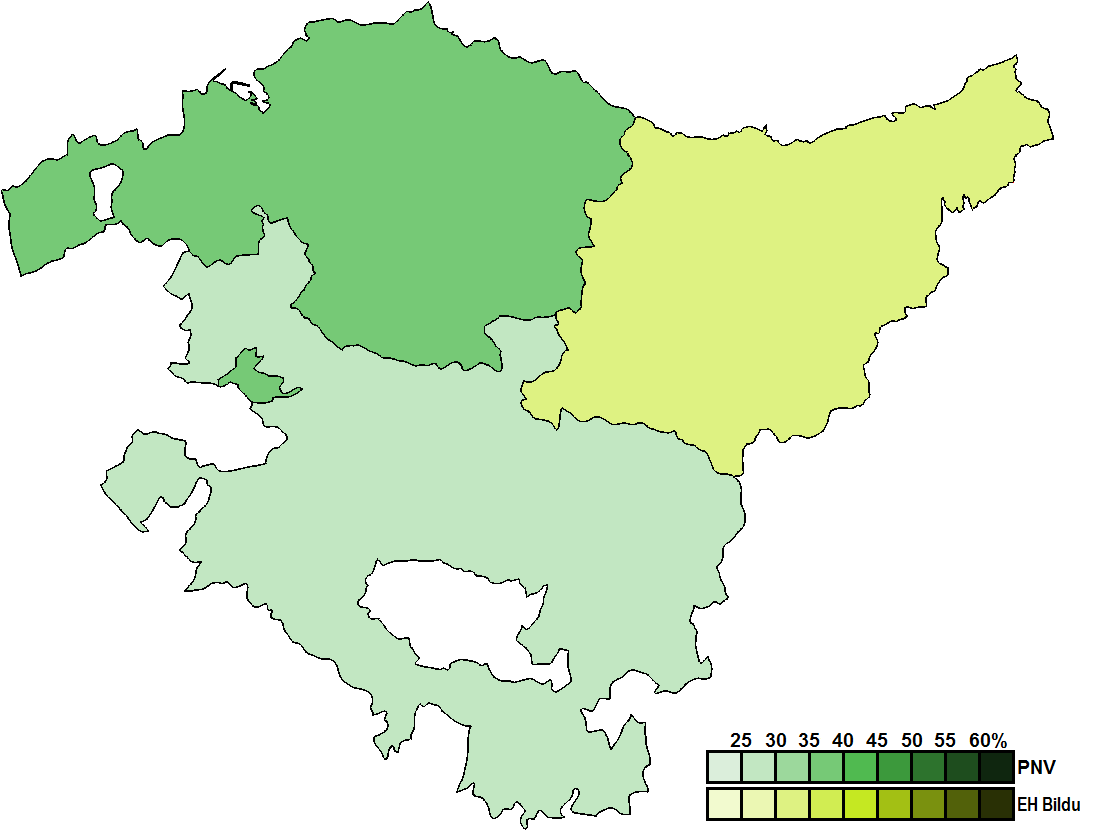
Lehendakari before election
Patxi López
PSE–EE (PSOE)
Lehendakari after election
Iñigo Urkullu
EAJ/PNV

A regional election was held in the Basque Country on 21 October 2012 to elect the 10th Parliament of the autonomous community. All 75 seats in the Parliament were up for election. It was held concurrently with a regional election in Galicia. Lehendakari Patxi López announced the parliament's dissolution half a year ahead of schedule as a result of the People's Party (PP) withdrawing their support from his government, prompting Galician president Alberto Núñez Feijóo, who had been scheduling a snap election in Galicia to be held at some point throughout late 2012, to make his decision to have a simultaneous vote.

The election saw a heavy defeat for the ruling Socialist Party of the Basque Country–Basque Country Left (PSE–EE), with the Basque Nationalist Party (PNV) retaining first place with a slightly diminished support. In the first electoral campaign without ETA—the band had announced a "definitive cessation of its armed activity" in October 2011—the abertzale left experienced a major breakthrough under the EH Bildu label nine years after the illegalization of Batasuna, obtaining a record result with 21 seats and 24.7% of the share. The PP deepened on its long-term decline and, with 11.6% and 10 seats, scored its worst result since 1990, while Union, Progress and Democracy (UPyD) retained its single seat in parliament. Altogether, the bloc formed by the PSE–EE, PP and UPyD which had supported López in 2009 was reduced from 39 to 27 seats.

Iñigo Urkullu of the PNV became the new lehendakari, forming a minority government with the sole support of his party after over three years in opposition. Under Urkullu, the PNV would see an ideological realignment from former lehendakari Juan José Ibarretxe's sovereigntist stance and confrontational style towards more moderate, pragmatic and big tent positions.

== Background ==
Following the 2009 regional election, Patxi López of the PSE–EE became lehendakari through a confidence and supply agreement with the PP, bringing an end to 30 years of uninterrupted rule by the Basque Nationalist Party (PNV) and sending the party to opposition in the regional parliament for the first time since the Spanish transition to democracy. The local PSE–PP alliance endured the historical rivalry at the national level between the two parties, despite suffering from frequent clashes as the PP set out a series of conditions for maintaining their support, as well as a steady opposition from the PNV. In May 2012, some months after winning the 2011 Spanish general election and forming the new Spanish government, the PP terminated the alliance in retaliation to the PSOE's opposition to Prime Minister Mariano Rajoy's reform agenda, prompting Patxi López to announce a snap regional election for October 2012.

On 5 September 2010, ETA declared a ceasefire at a time when it found itself militarily weakened by police action—the group had been unable to stage any attack in Spanish territory since 9 August 2009—and beleaguered by infighting, distrust in the operational capacities and reliability of its members and pressures from abertzale left groups (which were being kept politically outlawed by Spanish courts) for the band to stop the killings. On 10 January 2011, ETA proclaimed its will for the September 2010 ceasefire to be "permanent, general and verifiable" by international observers. Three days after the Donostia-San Sebastián International Peace Conference held on 17 October 2011, ETA would announce a "definitive cessation of its armed activity".

In April 2011, following the illegalization of Sortu in March—perceived as a continuation of Batasuna, the banned political branch of the ETA terrorist group—Eusko Alkartasuna (EA), Alternatiba and groups and independent individuals from the abertzale left formed a coalition named Bildu to contest the incoming 2011 local elections. Despite an early ruling by the Supreme Court on 2 May which barred Bildu from contesting, the Constitutional Court overturned the ban and allowed the coalition to run in the elections, in which it secured a major breakthrough by obtaining 25.6% and a majority of town councillors in the Basque Country. Aralar would join the coalition in late 2011 ahead of the 20 November general election under the Amaiur umbrella, which came second in the Basque Country with 24.1% of the vote, behind the PNV with 27.4%; in seats, however, Amaiur came out in top with six against the PNV's five. Subsequently, the four main groups that constituted Amaiur, namely Sortu—which would be legalized by the Constitutional Court in June 2012—EA, Alternatiba and Aralar, announced the establishment of EH Bildu as a joint electoral list ahead of the next Basque regional election, with Laura Mintegi being nominated as the alliance's candidate for lehendakari.

== Overview ==
Under the 1979 Statute of Autonomy, the Basque Parliament was the unicameral legislature of the Basque Autonomous Community, having legislative power in devolved matters, as well as the ability to grant or withdraw confidence from a lehendakari. The electoral and procedural rules were supplemented by national law provisions.

=== Date ===
The term of the Basque Parliament expired four years after the date of its previous election, unless it was dissolved earlier. The election decree was required to be issued no later than 25 days before the scheduled expiration date of parliament and published on the following day in the Official Gazette of the Basque Country (BOPV), with election day taking place 54 days after the decree's publication. The previous election was held on 1 March 2009, which meant that the chamber's term would have expired on 1 March 2013. The election decree was required to be published in the BOPV no later than 5 February 2013, setting the latest possible date for election day on 31 March 2013.

The lehendakari had the prerogative to dissolve the Basque Parliament at any given time and call a snap election, provided that no motion of no confidence was in process. In the event of an investiture process failing to elect a lehendakari within a 60-day period from the Parliament's reconvening, the chamber was to be automatically dissolved and a fresh election called.

The People's Party (PP), on whose confidence and supply the López's government relied, withdrew their support in May 2012 claiming "difficulties in finding meeting points" with the Socialist Party of the Basque Country–Basque Country Left (PSE–EE), leaving López in a clear minority. While initially intending to reach the end of the legislature, mounting pressure from both the PP and the Basque Nationalist Party (PNV) led López to announce on 21 August that he would be dissolving parliament and call a snap election for 21 October 2012 over an impossibility to keep carrying out the government's legislative agenda.

The Basque Parliament was officially dissolved on 28 August 2012 with the publication of the corresponding decree in the BOPV, setting election day for 21 October.

=== Electoral system ===
Voting for the Parliament was based on universal suffrage, comprising all Spanish nationals over 18 years of age, registered in the Basque Country and with full political rights, provided that they had not been deprived of the right to vote by a final sentence, nor were legally incapacitated. Amendments in 2011 introduced a requirement for non-resident citizens to apply for voting, a system known as "begged" voting (Spanish: Voto rogado).

The Basque Parliament had 75 seats. All were elected in three multi-member constituencies—corresponding to the provinces of Álava, Biscay and Gipuzkoa, each of which was assigned a fixed number of 25 seats to provide for an equal parliamentary representation of the three provinces—using the D'Hondt method and closed-list proportional voting, with a three percent-threshold of valid votes (including blank ballots) in each constituency. The use of this electoral method resulted in a higher effective threshold depending on district magnitude and vote distribution.

The law did not provide for by-elections to fill vacant seats; instead, any vacancies arising after the proclamation of candidates and during the legislative term were filled by the next candidates on the party lists or, when required, by designated substitutes.

=== Outgoing parliament ===
The table below shows the composition of the parliamentary groups in the chamber at the time of dissolution.

Parliamentary composition in August 2012
Groups	Parties	Legislators	
Groups	Parties	Seats	Total
Basque Nationalists Parliamentary Group	EAJ/PNV	30	30
Basque Socialists Parliamentary Group	PSE–EE (PSOE)	25	25
Basque People's Parliamentary Group	PP	13	13
Aralar Parliamentary Group	Aralar	4	4
Mixed Group	EA	1	3
Mixed Group	EzAn–IU	1	3
Mixed Group	UPyD	1	3

== Parties and candidates ==
The electoral law allowed for parties and federations registered in the interior ministry, alliances and groupings of electors to present lists of candidates. Parties and federations intending to form an alliance were required to inform the relevant electoral commission within 10 days of the election call, whereas groupings of electors needed to secure the signature of at least one percent of the electorate in the constituencies for which they sought election, disallowing electors from signing for more than one list. Additionally, a balanced composition of men and women was required in the electoral lists, so that candidates of either sex made up at least 40 percent of the total composition.

Below is a list of the main parties and alliances which contested the election:

Candidacy	Parties and alliances	Leading candidate	Ideology	Previous result		Gov.	Ref.
Candidacy	Parties and alliances	Leading candidate	Ideology	Vote %	Seats	Gov.	Ref.
EAJ/PNV	List: Basque Nationalist Party (EAJ/PNV)	Iñigo Urkullu	Basque nationalism Christian democracy Conservative liberalism	38.1%	30	X mark	
PSE–EE (PSOE)	List: Socialist Party of the Basque Country–Basque Country Left (PSE–EE (PSOE))	Patxi López	Social democracy	30.4%	25	check	
PP	List: People's Party (PP)	Antonio Basagoiti	Conservatism; Christian democracy	13.9%	13	X mark	
EH Bildu	List: Create (Sortu); Basque Solidarity (EA); Aralar (Aralar); Alternative (Alternatiba)	Laura Mintegi	Basque independence Abertzale left Socialism	9.6%	5	X mark	
EB–B	List: United Left–Greens (EB–B)	Raquel Modubar	Socialism; Social democracy Democratic socialism	3.5%	1	X mark	
UPyD	List: Union, Progress and Democracy (UPyD)	Gorka Maneiro	Social liberalism Radical centrism	2.1%	1	X mark	
IU–LV	List: Plural Left–United Left (EzAn–IU)	Mikel Arana	Socialism; Communism	Did not contest		X mark	

== Opinion polls ==
The tables below list opinion polling results in reverse chronological order, showing the most recent first and using the dates when the survey fieldwork was done, as opposed to the date of publication. Where the fieldwork dates are unknown, the date of publication is given instead. The highest percentage figure in each polling survey is displayed with its background shaded in the leading party's colour. If a tie ensues, this is applied to the figures with the highest percentages. The "Lead" column on the right shows the percentage-point difference between the parties with the highest percentages in a poll.

=== Voting intention estimates ===
The table below lists weighted voting intention estimates. Refusals are generally excluded from the party vote percentages, while question wording and the treatment of "don't know" responses and those not intending to vote may vary between polling organisations. When available, seat projections determined by the polling organisations are displayed below (or in place of) the percentages in a smaller font; 38 seats were required for an absolute majority in the Basque Parliament.

Color key:

Exit poll

Polling firm/Commissioner	Fieldwork date	Sample size	Turnout	PNV	PSE–EE (PSOE)	PP	Aralar	EA	EB–B	UPyD	EH Bildu	IU–LV	Lead
2012 regional election	21 Oct 2012	—N/a	64.0	34.2; 27	18.9; 16	11.6; 10	(Note: Within EH Bildu.)		1.5; 0	1.9; 1	24.7; 21	2.7; 0	9.5
Ipsos/EITB	21 Oct 2012	8,987	?	32.6; 24/27	16.9; 13/15	11.4; 9/11			1.5; 0	1.4; 0/1	28.9; 23/26	2.9; 0/1	3.7
NC Report/La Razón	2–13 Oct 2012	1,020	64.5	33.2; 24/27	18.9; 14/16	13.0; 10/12			–	2.5; 1	26.4; 20/22	3.7; 2	6.8
Aztiker/Gara	2–11 Oct 2012	1,200	?	34.7; 28	14.6; 12	10.8; 9			0.0; 0	2.2; 1	28.5; 24	3.2; 1	6.2
Sigma Dos/El Mundo	8–10 Oct 2012	1,050	?	33.3; 24/26	20.2; 16/18	14.7; 12			–	2.1; 0	24.5; 20	2.8; 1	8.8
MyWord/Cadena SER	3–10 Oct 2012	1,206	?	32.3; 25/27	18.8; 14/15	10.5; 9/10			1.5; 0	5.8; 1	25.6; 23/25	1.8; 0	6.7
Aztiker/Gara	1–10 Oct 2012	?	?	35.2; 28	14.6; 12	10.4; 8			–	2.2; 1	28.3; 24	3.3; 2	6.9
Aztiker/Gara	30 Sep–9 Oct 2012	?	?	34.4; 28	15.3; 12	10.8; 9			–	2.1; 1	28.2; 24	3.2; 1	6.2
Aztiker/Gara	29 Sep–8 Oct 2012	?	?	34.6; 27	15.3; 13	11.2; 10			–	2.0; 1	27.9; 23	3.1; 1	6.7
Ikerfel/El Correo	6–7 Oct 2012	2,000	?	33.1; 25/27	18.5; 15/16	12.5; 10			–	1.9; 0/1	26.3; 21	4.5; 2/3	6.8
Aztiker/Gara	28 Sep–7 Oct 2012	?	?	32.7; 27	15.6; 13	11.5; 9			–	2.6; 1	27.2; 23	3.8; 2	5.5
Ikertalde/GPS	1–5 Oct 2012	2,254	69.0	33.4; 24/26	19.4; 16/17	11.4; 10			0.7; 0	1.5; 1	26.6; 21/23	2.6; 0/1	6.8
Aztiker/Gara	25 Sep–5 Oct 2012	?	?	32.2; 26	16.8; 13	11.8; 10			–	2.1; 1	27.4; 24	3.0; 1	4.8
NC Report/La Razón	25 Sep–4 Oct 2012	510	?	32.1; 24/25	17.9; 14	13.3; 10/12			–	2.8; 1	28.0; 21/23	? 3	4.1
Aztiker/Gara	24 Sep–4 Oct 2012	?	?	33.4; 26	14.9; 13	12.4; 11			–	2.0; 0	27.2; 23	3.4; 2	6.2
Gizaker/Grupo Noticias	2–3 Oct 2012	1,350	68.3	33.9; 24/25	19.8; 16/17	14.2; 11/13			1.1; 0	1.3; 0	27.1; 21/22	1.9; 0	6.8
Aztiker/Gara	23 Sep–3 Oct 2012	?	?	35.8; 26	15.8; 14	13.8; 11			–	1.7; 1	27.4; 22	3.6; 1	8.4
Aztiker/Gara	22 Sep–2 Oct 2012	1,030	?	35.1; 26	16.3; 14	14.1; 11			0.2; 0	1.7; 0	26.8; 22	3.8; 2	8.3
NC Report/La Razón	30 Sep 2012	?	?	31.5; 23/25	18.1; 14/15	13.7; 11/13			–	3.1; 0	27.5; 22/24	? 0/1	4.0
CIS	10–25 Sep 2012	2,898	?	36.2; 27	17.2; 14	10.7; 9/10			–	2.0; 0	25.1; 21/22	4.2; 3	11.1
NC Report/La Razón	23 Sep 2012	?	?	31.5; 23/25	18.2; 14/15	13.8; 11/13			–	2.5; 0	27.7; 21/24	? 1/2	3.8
NC Report/La Razón	16 Sep 2012	?	?	32.0; 23/26	18.6; 14/16	14.3; 11/13			–	2.9; 1	26.7; 21/22	? 1	5.3
NC Report/La Razón	9 Sep 2012	?	?	31.8	18.9	14.2			–	2.8	26.3	–	5.5
NC Report/La Razón	21–25 Aug 2012	570	64.3	31.2; 22/25	19.0; 14/16	14.1; 11/13			–	3.1; 1	26.5; 20/22	3.5; 2	4.7
Sigma Dos/El Mundo	22–24 Aug 2012	900	?	33.7; 24/25	21.4; 17	12.8; 12			–	1.1; 0	27.3; 21/22	2.3; 0	6.4
NC Report/La Razón	21–23 Jun 2012	750	64.3	30.6; 22/24	19.5; 15/16	16.7; 14			–	2.3; 0	25.1; 21/22	3.8; 1/2	5.5
Low Cost/Libertad Digital	11–18 Jun 2012	750	?	30.9; 25/26	22.8; 18/19	14.6; 10			–	1.5; 0	23.8; 19/20	3.5; 0/3	8.8
Ikerfel/El Correo	7–14 Jun 2012	2,000	?	34.6; 24/26	18.8; 14/17	12.1; 11/12			–	1.2; 0	25.8; 19/21	4.7; 2	8.8
CPS/EHU	8–24 May 2012	1,200	65	32.1; 23/24	20.0; 17	14.0; 12/13			2.0; 0	1.8; 0	24.7; 22	3.0; 0	7.4
NC Report/La Razón	7–12 May 2012	900	64.3	29.8; 22/23	19.1; 15	16.5; 14	(Note: Within Amaiur.)		–	–	27.2; 22/23	3.5; 1/2	2.6
Gara	23 Apr 2012	1,875	?	29.0; 22	15.0; 12	16.0; 15	1.0; 0		–	–	28.0; 24	5.0; 2	1.0
CPS/EHU	25 Nov–19 Dec 2011	1,200	65	30.7; 22/23	18.3; 16	15.4; 14			–	1.8; 0	24.7; 19/22	3.1; 0/3	6.0
2011 general election	20 Nov 2011	—N/a	67.3	27.4 (20)	21.6 (18)	17.8 (15)			–	1.8 (0)	24.1 (20)	3.7 (2)	3.3
2011 foral elections	22 May 2011	—N/a	63.5	30.9 (24)	16.8 (13)	14.3 (13)	3.5 (1)	(Note: Within Bildu.)	3.3 (2)	0.8 (0)	25.3 (22)	–	5.6
Gizaker/Grupo Noticias	27–29 Jan 2011	1,100	71.7	36.7; 29/30	24.4; 20/21	12.4; 11/12	5.4; 3/4	2.3; 0	2.8; 0	1.5; 1	12.8; 9/10	–	12.3
Gizaker/Grupo Noticias	1–5 Mar 2010	?	67.7	38.9; 31	29.3; 24	13.3; 12	9.5; 5	3.3; 1	2.2; 1	1.8; 1	–	–	9.6
2009 EP election	7 Jun 2009	—N/a	41.2	28.5 (21)	27.8 (24)	16.0 (14)	5.6 (4)		1.8 (0)	1.5 (0)	16.0 (12)	–	0.7
2009 regional election	1 Mar 2009	—N/a	64.7	38.1; 30	30.4; 25	13.9; 13	6.0; 4	3.6; 1	3.5; 1	2.1; 1	–	–	7.7

=== Voting preferences ===
The table below lists raw, unweighted voting preferences.

Polling firm/Commissioner	Fieldwork date	Sample size	PNV	PSE–EE (PSOE)	PP	Aralar	EA	EB–B	UPyD	EH Bildu	IU–LV	Question	X mark	Lead
2012 regional election (Note: Does not include non-resident citizens.)	21 Oct 2012	—N/a	22.3	12.3	7.6			1.0	1.3	16.1	1.8	—N/a	34.2	6.2
MyWord/Cadena SER	3–10 Oct 2012	1,206	12.8	10.1	5.9			2.0	5.2	7.1	2.8	40.0	7.5	2.7
CIS	10–25 Sep 2012	2,898	20.5	9.5	2.5			–	0.5	14.6	3.0	28.1	16.3	5.9
2011 general election	20 Nov 2011	—N/a	18.8	14.8	12.2			–	1.2	16.5	2.5	—N/a	30.8	2.3
2011 foral elections	22 May 2011	—N/a	19.4	10.5	9.0	2.2		2.1	0.5	15.9	–	—N/a	36.5	3.5
2009 EP election	7 Jun 2009	—N/a	11.9	11.6	6.7	2.4		0.8	0.6	6.7	–	—N/a	58.0	0.3
2009 regional election	1 Mar 2009	—N/a	22.3	17.8	8.2	3.5	2.1	2.0	1.2	–	–	—N/a	35.7	4.5

=== Victory preferences ===
The table below lists opinion polling on the victory preferences for each party in the event of a regional election taking place.

Polling firm/Commissioner	Fieldwork date	Sample size	PNV	PSE–EE (PSOE)	PP	UPyD	EH Bildu	IU–LV	Other/ None	Question	Lead
CIS	10–25 Sep 2012	2,898	25.0	11.5	3.1	0.7	17.4	3.3	4.1	34.9	7.6

=== Victory likelihood ===
The table below lists opinion polling on the perceived likelihood of victory for each party in the event of a regional election taking place.

Polling firm/Commissioner	Fieldwork date	Sample size	PNV	PSE–EE (PSOE)	PP	EH Bildu	IU–LV	Other/ None	Question	Lead
CIS	10–25 Sep 2012	2,898	59.5	3.2	1.1	9.6	0.1	0.1	26.4	49.9

=== Preferred Lehendakari ===
The table below lists opinion polling on leader preferences to become lehendakari.

Polling firm/Commissioner	Fieldwork date	Sample size							Other/ None/ Not care	Question	Lead
Polling firm/Commissioner	Fieldwork date	Sample size	Urkullu PNV	López PSE–EE	Basagoiti PP	Maneiro UPyD	Mintegi EH Bildu	Arana IU–LV	Other/ None/ Not care	Question	Lead
CIS	10–25 Sep 2012	2,898	24.3	12.9	3.0	0.4	13.5	2.0	15.3	28.6	10.8

== Results ==
=== Overall ===
← Summary of the 21 October 2012 Basque Parliament election results →
Parties and alliances	Popular vote			Seats	
Parties and alliances	Votes	%	±pp	Total	+/−
Basque Nationalist Party (EAJ/PNV)	384,766	34.16	−3.98	27	−3
Basque Country Gather (EH Bildu)^{1}	277,923	24.67	+15.05	21	+16
Socialist Party of the Basque Country–Basque Country Left (PSE–EE (PSOE))	212,809	18.89	−11.47	16	−9
People's Party (PP)	130,584	11.59	−2.36	10	−3
United Left–The Greens: Plural Left (IU–LV)	30,318	2.69	New	0	±0
Union, Progress and Democracy (UPyD)	21,539	1.91	−0.21	1	±0
United Left–Greens (EB–B)	17,345	1.54	−1.93	0	−1
Equo Greens–Basque Ecologists (Equo)^{2}	11,625	1.03	+0.49	0	±0
Blank Seats (EB/AZ)	11,480	1.02	New	0	±0
Animalist Party Against Mistreatment of Animals (PACMA/ATTKAA)	4,066	0.36	+0.22	0	±0
Hartos.org (Hartos.org)	2,831	0.25	New	0	±0
For a Fairer World (PUM+J)	2,476	0.22	−0.07	0	±0
Humanist Party (PH)	1,113	0.10	+0.06	0	±0
Family and Life Party (PFyV)	821	0.07	−0.03	0	±0
Internationalist Socialist Workers' Party (POSI)	778	0.07	−0.04	0	±0
Communist Unification of Spain (UCE)	684	0.06	New	0	±0
Basque Communists–Communist Party of the Peoples of Spain (EK–PCPE)	442	0.04	New	0	±0
Welcome (Ongi Etorri)	101	0.01	New	0	±0
Community Integration Party (PYC)	59	0.01	New	0	±0
Blank ballots	14,640	1.30	+0.20		
Total	1,126,400			75	±0
Valid votes	1,126,400	99.18	+7.98		
Invalid votes	9,168	0.81	−7.98		
Votes cast / turnout	1,135,568	63.96	−0.72		
Abstentions	639,783	36.04	+0.72		
Registered voters	1,775,351				
Sources
Footnotes: ^{1} Basque Country Gather results are compared to the combined totals of Aralar and Basque Solidarity in the 2009 election.; ^{2} Equo Greens–Basque Ecologists results are compared to The Greens totals in the 2009 election.

Popular vote
EAJ/PNV	34.16%
EH Bildu	24.67%
PSE–EE (PSOE)	18.89%
PP	11.59%
IU–LV	2.69%
UPyD	1.91%
EB–B	1.54%
Equo	1.03%
EB/AZ	1.02%
Others	1.19%
Blank ballots	1.30%

Seats
EAJ/PNV	36.00%
EH Bildu	28.00%
PSE–EE (PSOE)	21.33%
PP	13.33%
UPyD	1.33%

=== Distribution by constituency ===
Constituency	PNV		EH Bildu		PSE–EE		PP		UPyD	
Constituency	%	S	%	S	%	S	%	S	%	S
Álava	25.5	7	21.7	6	19.3	6	18.7	5	3.5	1
Biscay	37.9	11	21.2	6	18.7	5	11.7	3	1.8	−
Gipuzkoa	31.6	9	31.8	9	19.0	5	8.4	2	1.4	−
Total	34.2	27	24.7	21	18.9	16	11.6	10	1.9	1

== Aftermath ==
=== Government formation ===
Investiture
Ballot →	12 December 2012		13 December 2012	
Required majority →	38 out of 75		Simple	
Iñigo Urkullu (PNV): • PNV (27)	27 / 75	X mark	27 / 75	check
Laura Mintegi (EH Bildu): • EH Bildu (21)	21 / 75	X mark	21 / 75	X mark
Abstentions/Blank ballots: • PSE–EE (16); • PP (10); • UPyD (1)	27 / 75		27 / 75	
Absentees	0 / 75		0 / 75	

== Bibliography ==
- Ley Orgánica 3/1979, de 18 de diciembre, de Estatuto de Autonomía para el País Vasco (Organic Law 3/1979). Official State Gazette (in Spanish). 18 December 1979 [version as of 22 December 1979]. BOE-A-1979-30177.
- Ley 7/1981, de 30 de junio, sobre Ley de Gobierno (Law 7/1981). Official State Gazette (in Spanish). 30 June 1981 [version as of 7 June 2012]. BOE-A-2012-5927.
- Ley Orgánica 5/1985, de 19 de junio, del Régimen Electoral General (Organic Law 5/1985). Official State Gazette (in Spanish). 19 June 1985 [version as of 22 September 2012]. BOE-A-1985-11672.
- Ley 5/1990, de 15 de junio, de Elecciones al Parlamento Vasco (Law 5/1990). Official State Gazette (in Spanish). 15 June 1990 [version as of 2 March 2005]. BOE-A-2012-2859.
- Decreto 12/2012, de 27 de agosto, del Lehendakari, por el que se disuelve el Parlamento Vasco y se convocan elecciones (PDF) (Decree 12/2012). Official Gazette of the Basque Country (in Spanish). 27 August 2012.
