= Euskal Heritarrok =

Euskal Herritarrok (Basque for "We, the Basque citizens") was a coalition created in 1998 that replaced Herri Batasuna. It was intended as an expansion of this coalition to include a wider spectrum of sympathizers. The name played with the rather usual acronym EH that also means Euskal Herria: the Basque Country.

That year, Euskal Herritarrok obtained 14 deputies in the Basque Parliament with 18% of popular support (one of the highest ever for the Nationalist Left). In 1999 it signed a pact to support the government of Juan José Ibarretxe (EAJ-PNV). The agreement broke in 2000 after the failure of a year-long ETA truce (see: Lizarra Agreement) on which they accused each other of being responsible.

After these events Herri Batasuna started a new process of debate that ended in the formation of Batasuna and the split of Aralar.

== See also ==
- Herri Batasuna
- Batasuna
- Aralar
- Zutik
- ETA
