= Herritarren Zerrenda =

The Herritarren Zerrenda (HZ, English: List of Fellow Citizens; Spanish: Lista de Conciudadanos) was a Basque nationalist political party in Spain and France, created in 2004 to run in the European Parliament election.

== 2004 European Parliament election ==
=== Spain ===
HZ aspired to represent the nationalist left, including the in 2003 banned pro-ETA Batasuna party. However the Supreme Court of Spain banned HZ, considering it to be a direct continuation of Batasuna. The list was therefore not allowed on the ballot and called for a spoiled vote in response. In the Basque Country 98,250 (12.2%) were spoiled, and in Navarre 15.683 votes (7.3%), amounting to 113.933 spoiled votes in total.

=== France ===
However the ban in Spain had no effect on the list participating in the elections in France. The list, led by Mirentchu Laco, only contested the elections in the constituency of Sud-Ouest (which includes Iparralde). The list gained 5,157 votes (0.20%) in the constituency. Almost all of the votes came from Iparralde, where the list came first in a few rural communes, such as in Saint-Martin-d'Arrossa, Lecumberry and Lichans-Sunhar.

== See also ==
- Batasuna
- Communist Party of the Basque Homelands (a similar party used to circumvent the Batasuna ban)
- Basque Nationalist Action (also a party used to circumvent the Batasuna ban)
