= Nationalist Republican Party =

Nationalist Republican Party may refer to:

- Basque Nationalist Republican Party
- Nationalist Republican Party (Portugal)
- Nationalist Republican Party (Suriname)
- Nationalist Republican Party (Mexico) in the 1920 Mexican general election
