= Askatasuna =

Freedom Askatasuna
- Founded: August 31, 1998
- Dissolved: February 18, 2009
- Ideology: Basque nationalism Socialism; Ezker abertzalea Left-wing nationalism Basque independence Revolutionary socialism
- Political position: Far left

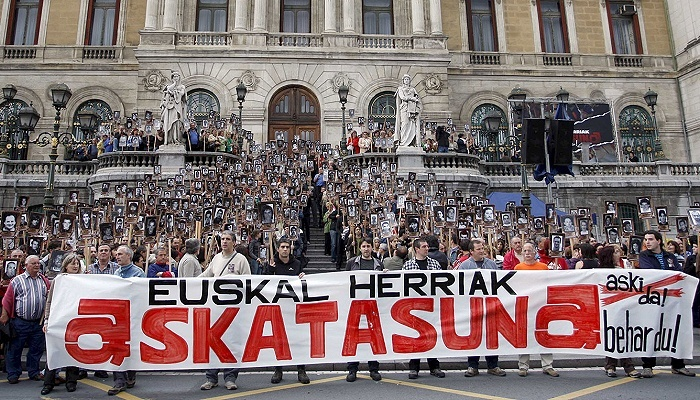
Demonstration in Bilbao asking for the release of Basque political prisoners.

Askatasuna (from the Basque word meaning "Freedom") is a Basque political party registered on 31 August 1998, and outlawed in 2009 by the Spanish Audiencia Nacional under the 2002 Political Parties Law.

== History ==
In 1998, several notable events occurred around the Basque nationalist left: the National Table of Herri Batasuna was jailed, the Pact of Estella was signed, ETA declared an indefinite truce and the electoral coalition Euskal Herritarrok presented itself to the Basque elections of the same year. Askatasuna was created that year by a small group of members of the Ezker abertzalea that feared the banning of the other political parties and organizations of the Basque national movement.

Three years later, in May 2001, with a different situation since ETA had returned to commit deadly attacks, Askatasuna presented lists to the Basque elections in the three provinces. Askatasuna barely campaigned and won a very meager percentage of votes (0.05%).

A month later, in June 2001, Euskal Herritarrok and Herri Batasuna created a new political party, Batasuna, which in March 2003 was outlawed by the Supreme Court according to a new law on political parties, that allowed the banning of those political parties that were against the democratic regime of liberties, supported violence and/or activities of terrorist groups.

Despite the outlawing of Batasuna, Askatasuna continued to appear in the register of political parties and was in all respects a legal political formation, although since 2001 had not had any activity. This led some politicians and media communications analysts suggest that Askatasuna was being kept as a legal political brand that could eventually be used by Batasuna to present lists in future elections. In mid-January 2009, the press reported that Askatasuna wanted to participate in the Basque elections of 2009. The PP asked justice to monitor Askatasuna to see if it was the electoral brand of the outlawed Batasuna. Askatasuna and Demokrazia Hiru Milioi (D3M) were banned from the elections by the Supreme Court of Spain due to their alleged links to ETA and Batasuna. Soon later, both Askatasuna and Demokrazia Hiru Millioi were also banned as political parties and dissolved by the Constitutional Court of Spain.

On June 11, 2012, the Audiencia Nacional cleared the promoters Askatasuna considering that their activity did not involve "direct connection" with the purposes and methods of the terrorist organization ETA. The judgment recognized that Askatasuna "was the successor" of Herri Batasuna, Euskal Herritarrok and Batasuna, and therefore "had to be aware of their contribution to the succession of the outlawed parties"; but "has not been established that the accused, consciously and deliberately acted in support of the terrorist organization ETA" but exercised "political participation rights of those who are the owners and the exercise of which have not been suspended or disqualified.
