= Arantza Urkaregi =

Spanish biostatistician, Basque politician, trade unionist, and feminist

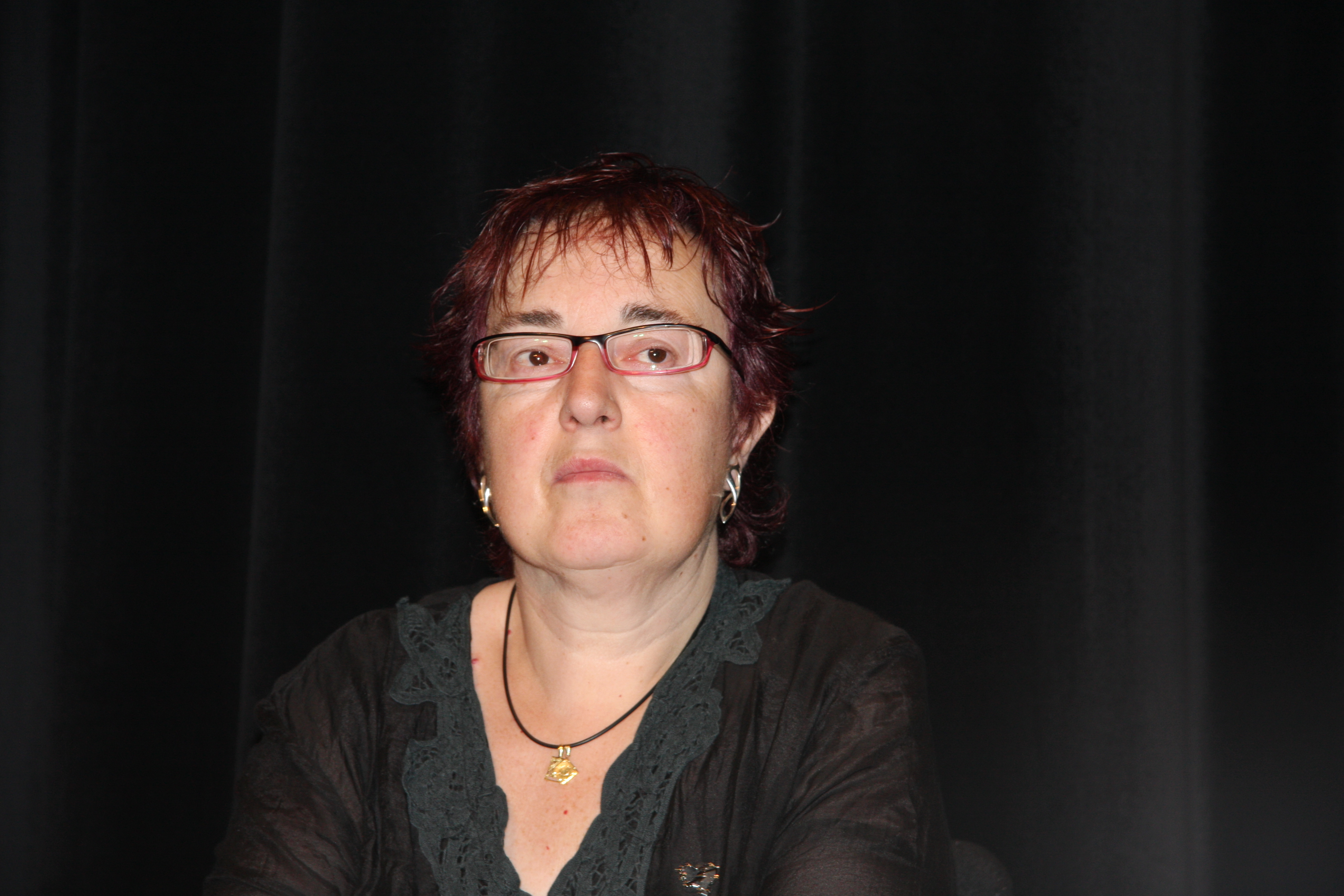
- Born: 23 April 1954 (age 72); San Sebastian
- Occupation: Professor at University of the Basque Country
- Known for: mathematics, union organizing

Arantza Urkaregi (born 23 April 1954) is a mathematician, union organizer, and feminist politician. Within mathematics, she writes, researches, and teaches predominantly about statistics. With regard to her political work, she was involved in the communist party in Basque and the early feminist movement there.

== Life ==
Urkaregi was born on 23 April 1954 in San Sebastian, in the Basque Autonomous community in Spain. She studied at the University of Basque Country.

== Activist work ==
In her 20s, she became involved in EMK (the Basque communist party) and Basque feminist organizations. For example, she was largely involved in the first meetings of the Basque feminist movement in December 1977. While these meetings fit into the broader theme of feminist movements in the 60s and 70s, they are especially important because of the particular anti-feminist pushback in Basque. These meetings in December 1977 were actually inspired by similar Spanish feminist meetings. Overall, these meetings, which had attendance far exceeding expectations, were key in demonstrating the existence of, and support for, a Basque feminist movement.

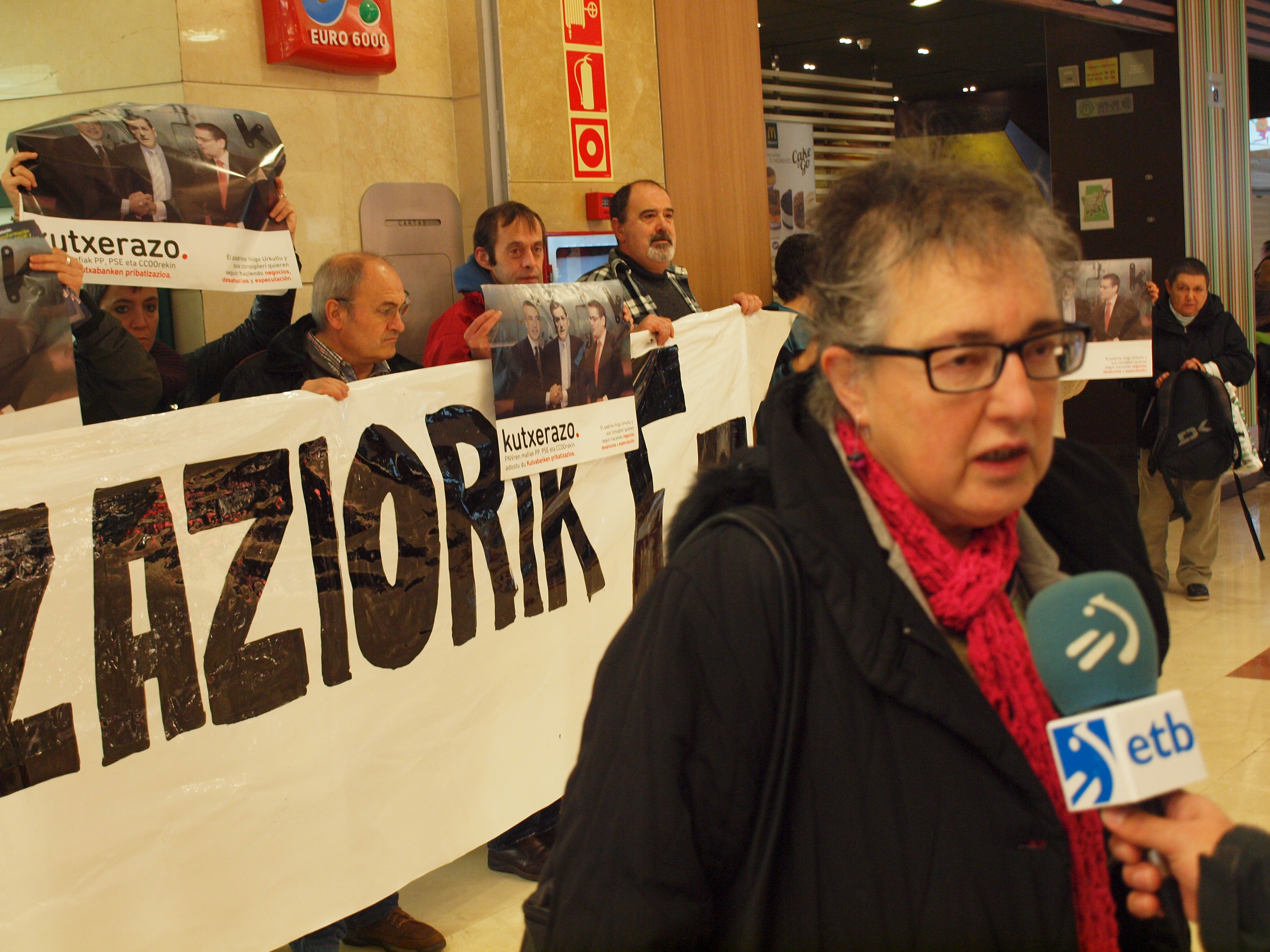
Urkaregi talking to the press

Urkaregi has also been deeply involved in a Basque teachers union (Steilas), which recently (in 2020) went on strike in protest of insufficient support for teaching in the midst of COVID-19. She has also been on the Bilbao City Council as a member of the Abertzale Sozialistak group. Particularly, Urkaregi has been active in Basque separatist groups, such being the spokesperson for Basque Nationalist Action, which was outlawed by the Spanish government in 2008 for supposed ties to ETA. In 2009, she was arrested along with other members of the group.

== Academic work ==
As demonstrated by Inguma, which is a database for publications in the Basque scientific community, Urkaregi has published extensively about biostatistics. There are over 50 publications attributed to her here, including a biostatistics textbook, articles about feminism and math, and courses.
