= Andrés Herzog =

Spanish lawyer and politician

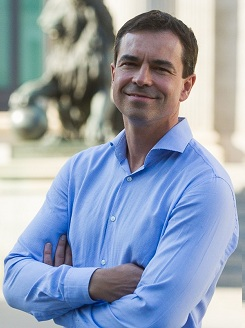

Spokesperson of Union, Progress and Democracy
- In office 11 July 2015 – 16 January 2016
- Deputy: Gorka Maneiro
- Preceded by: Rosa Díez
- Succeeded by: Gorka Maneiro

Deputy Spokesperson of Union, Progress and Democracy
- In office 26 September 2007 – 11 July 2015
- President: Rosa Díez
- Preceded by: First holder
- Succeeded by: Gorka Maneiro

Personal details
- Born: Andrés Gustavo Herzog Sánchez; 21 January 1974 (age 52) San Sebastián, Spain
- Party: Union, Progress and Democracy

Andrés Gustavo Herzog Sánchez (born 21 January 1974) is a Spanish lawyer and politician who was the spokesperson of the centrist party Union, Progress and Democracy (UPyD).

== Background ==
Herzog was born in San Sebastián, Basque Country, and is the son of Carlos Herzog, a fur merchant of Polish-Jewish descent. His household observed neither Basque nor Jewish traditions. He graduated in Law from the University of Navarre, and trialled for representing Spain at Judo at the 1996 Summer Olympics.

== Career ==
Herzog worked for the law firm Garrigues. Upon reading their initial manifesto in 2007, he joined UPyD.

In July 2015, he was voted as the party's new spokesperson after the resignation of Rosa Díez. He refused an electoral pact with fellow centrists Citizens.

== Personal life ==
Herzog is married to an Argentine woman. His favourite television series is political drama The West Wing, and his favourite film is The Bridges of Madison County.
