= Sortu =

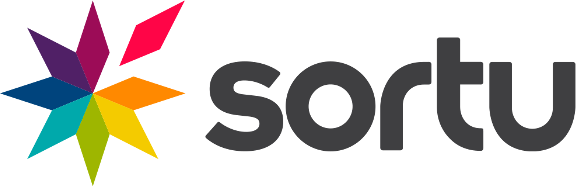
- Secretary-General: Arkaitz Rodriguez
- Founded: 9 February 2011
- Preceded by: Batasuna
- Headquarters: Bilbao, Basque Country
- Youth wing: Ernai
- Membership (2018): ≈10,000 (Note: 5,000 dues-paying members and 5,000 non-paying "supporters".)
- Ideology: Socialism; Basque Country independence; Soft Euroscepticism
- Political position: Left-wing to far-left
- National affiliation: EH Bildu; EH Bai
- European Parliament group: European United Left–Nordic Green Left
- Trade union affiliation: Langile Abertzaleen Batzordeak
- Congress of Deputies: 1 / 23 Basque seats
- Spanish Senate: 1 / 20 Basque seats
- European Parliament: 1 / 61 Spanish seats
- Basque Parliament: 4 / 75
- Parliament of Navarre: 4 / 50

Website
- sortu.eus

Sortu (English: Create) is a Basque socialist political party. Founded in February 2011, it is the first political party belonging to the Basque nationalist "abertzale left" that openly rejects any kind of political violence. Before Sortu, sections of the Basque nationalist left who rejected ETA's violence left the movement and founded another party, Aralar, to represent that element of the abertzale left.

== History ==
At a press conference on 8 February 2011, party supporters backed a Basque state "within a European Union framework, via exclusively peaceful and political channels." They further rejected all violence "categorically and without hesitation...including that of ETA."

The Guardian and other papers described the party as a new iteration of the Batasuna, ETA's political wing, which has been banned since 2003. The District Attorney of the Basque Country High Court, however, stated that the two parties are not the same and that Sortu "has said things never previously said." The Spanish government announced in January 2011 that it will ask the courts to rule on the legality of the new party. "If this rejection of violence included in the statutes of the new party allow for the end of this situation of illegality or not, it is a decision that is up to judges" said Deputy Prime Minister Alfredo Perez Rubalcaba.

As of 23 March 2011, Sortu will not be able to register as a political party with the Interior Ministry. This was decided by the "61st chamber" of the Supreme Court, which considered the new party to be sponsored by the "Basque nationalist left" as the successor to Batasuna, therefore in affiliation with ETA. After deliberating for 12 hours, the ruling was passed with the support of most magistrates; however, three magistrates voted against the ban. According to most magistrates, the evidence of the links between ETA and the eighth political party created by the Basque nationalist left is so solid that the rejection of violence contained in the statutes is now of secondary importance.

In response to the decision, some members of Sortu, together with other allies, formed a new political coalition, Bildu. Bildu itself was initially banned, but the decision was overturned and Bildu was allowed to participate and went on to receive 26% of the vote in May 2011 regional elections.

Finally, on 20 June 2012, Sortu was legalized by the Constitutional Court, by only a 1-vote difference. Sortu is a member of EH Bildu political coalition with other left-wing pro-independence political groups.

The party was officially launched after the legalisation on 23 February 2013, with Hasier Arraiz as their first president.

In July 2016, the party went through a process of "re-foundation", in which their leadership structure was significantly changed, with Arraiz's role removed entirely. An "open assembly" was organised for 2 July that year to discuss issues with citizens of the Basque Country.

== Electoral performance ==
=== Basque Parliament ===
| Date | Votes | | | Seats | | Status | Size |
| Date | # | % | ±pp | # | ± | Status | Size |
|---|---|---|---|---|---|---|---|
| 2012 | 277,923 | 24.7% | — | 11 / 75 | — | Opposition | * |
| 2016 | 255,172 | 21.1% | –3.6 | 12 / 75 | 1 | Opposition | * |

- * Within EH Bildu.
