= Laura Mintegi =

Basque author and politician

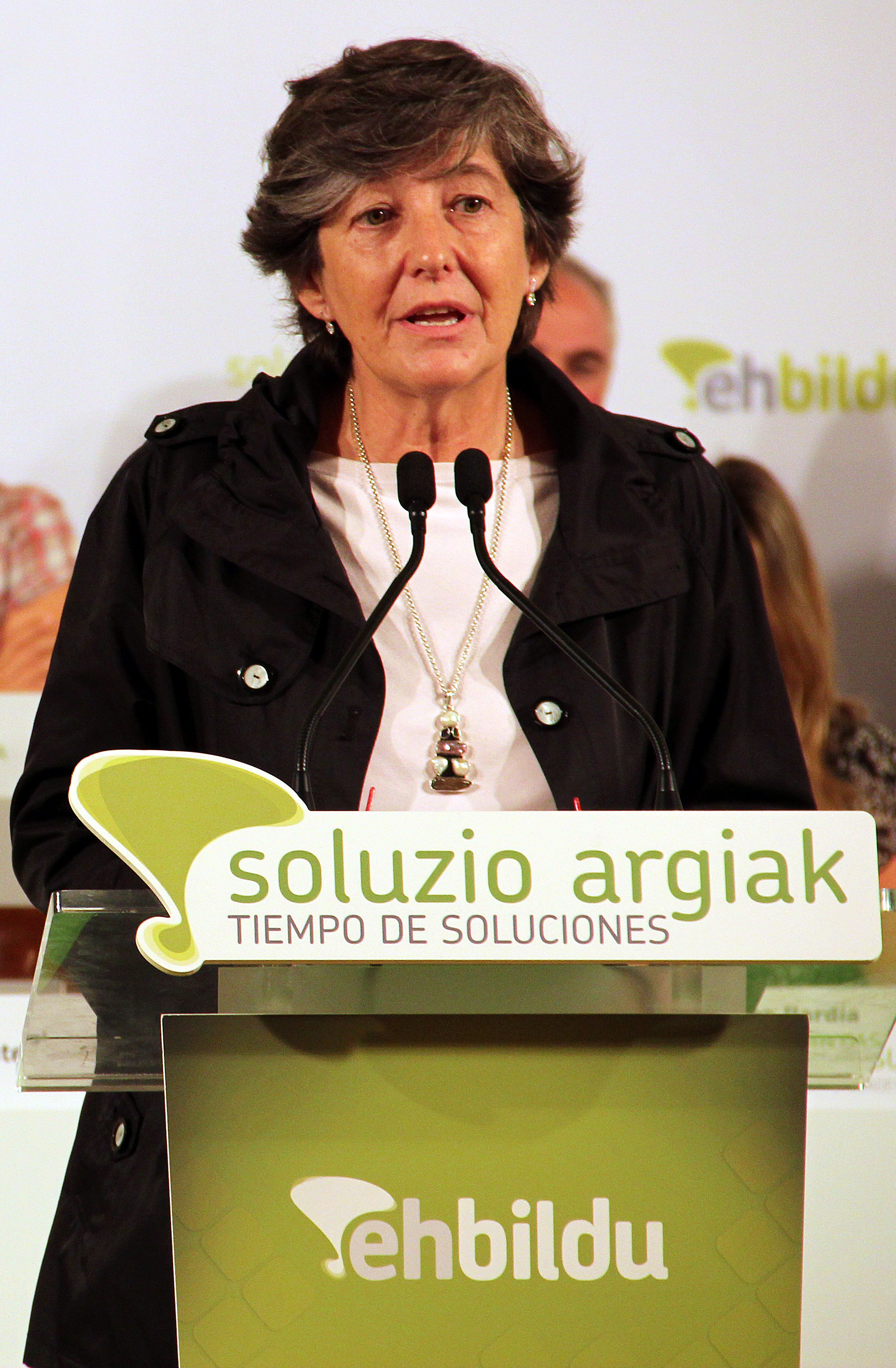
Laura Mintegi

Laura Mintegi Lakarra (born October 26, 1955) is a Basque author, politician and a professor at the University of the Basque Country. Although she was born in Navarre, she moved to Biscay at an early age and has lived there ever since; first in Bilbao and later in Algorta.

She has a degree in History and a PhD in Psychology. She has been a professor at the University of the Basque Country since 1981, where she teaches in the Department of Didactics for Language and Literature. She was the director of this Department from 1999 to 2006, and retook the job again in 2010. Besides that, she has been the president of the Basque PEN Club since 2004. Euskaltzaindia (the official academy of Basque language) named her correspondent in 2006.

She was won several literary awards, for instance, the “Azkue Nobela Saria”, the “Donostia Hiria Saria” and the “Jon Mirande Saria” and the “Golden Pen”, award in recognition of her literary career. She has also been a judge for other awards, such as the “Certámen de Narrativa María Maeztu”, the Grant “Joseba Jaka”, the “Rikardo Arregi Kazetaritza Saria” and the “René Cassin Human Rights” Award. She is a usual collaborator in the media, both in the audiovisual media (in TV stations like ETB, Hamaika Telebista and in radio stations like Bizkaia Irratia, Egin Irratia, Bilbo Hiria Irratia, Euskalerria Irratia and Euskadi Irratia) and the written media (Anaitasuna, Argia, Susa, Ttu-ttuá, Egin, Euskaldunon Egunkaria, Gara, Berria, Jakin, Hegats and many others).

== Short Story Collection ==
- Ilusioaren ordaina (The Cost of Illusion) (1983, Erein)

== Novels ==
- Bai... baina ez (1986, Susa): Republish in Elkarlanean 1999
- Legez kanpo (1991, Elkar)
- Nerea eta biok (1994, Txalaparta)
- Sisifo maite minez (2001, Txalaparta)
- Ecce homo (2006, Txalaparta)
- Akabo (2025, Txalaparta)

== Essay ==
- Sujektibitatea euskal nobelagintzan: Stephen Crane-ren "The Red Badge of Courage"' (1999, UPV/EHU)

== Biography ==
- Julene Azpeitia (1988, Eusko Jaurlaritza)

== Translations ==
- La topera in...Antologia de la Narrativa Vasca Actual (1986, Edicions del Mall) (Translated to Spanish)
- Mole Hole in... Contemporary Basque Fiction (1990, University of Nevada, Reno) (Translated to English)
- Sisifo enamorado (2003, Txalaparta) (Translated to Spanish)
- Nerea and I (2005, Peter Lang, New York) (Translated to English)
- Ecce homo (2007, ONCE) (Printed in Basque in braille)
- Ecce homo (2009, Txalaparta) (Translated to Spanish)
- Sisyphus verliefd (2011, Zirimiri Press, Amsterdam) (Translated to Dutch)
- Ecce homo (2012, Pahl-Rugenstein, Bonn) (Translated to German)
