= Antonio Basagoiti =

Spanish politician and economist

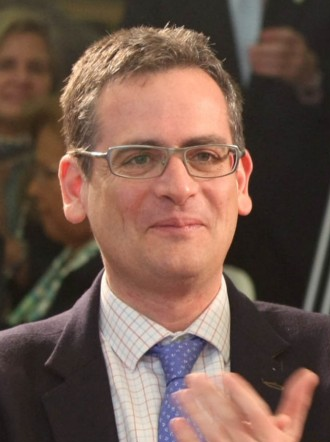
Basagoiti in 2011

Antonio Basagoiti Pastor (born 25 October 1969) is a Spanish banker and former politician of the People's Party (PP). He was a member of Bilbao City Council from 1995 to 2008, a member of the Basque Parliament from 2009 to 2013, and president of the People's Party of the Basque Country from 2008 to 2013. He then left politics and moved to Mexico to resume his banking career.

== Early life ==
Basagoiti was born in Madrid. His father Antonio Basagoiti García-Tuñón was president of the bank Banesto, and his great-great-grandfather Antonio Basagoiti Arteta was a Basque who founded the Banco Hispano Americano. At age one, Basagoiti relocated to Getxo in the Basque Country, and moved out at age seven due to family reasons. He returned to the region for his law degree at the University of Deusto.

== Political career ==
=== Early career ===
After working in banking, Basagoiti moved into politics after being inspired by his aunt Ascensión Pastor Parres, a People's Party (PP) member of Bilbao City Council. He joined the New Generations of the People's Party (NNGG) in 1995, and in the same year he was elected to the council. Following a pact between the PP and the Basque Nationalist Party (EAJ-PNV), he was on the local government from 1996 to 1997, tasked with the area of education, women and the environment. For five months from October 1998, he was director general of the Youth Institute, having been named by Javier Arenas, the national Minister of Labour.

Basagoiti was the PP's candidate for mayor of Bilbao in the 1999 election. Later that year, he was one of the three PP spokespeople in provincial capitals – alongside those of San Sebastián and Vitoria-Gasteiz – to be named vice secretaries-general of the People's Party of the Basque Country. In December 2004, he was elected president of the PP in the province of Biscay.

=== President of the People's Party of the Basque Country ===
In July 2008, the president of the PP in the Basque Country, María San Gil, resigned due to disputes with the national leadership, and was succeeded by Basagoiti. In October, he was unanimously chosen as their candidate for Lehendakari – head of the regional government – with the official selection taking place a day before his 39th birthday. In the elections, his party came third with 13 seats, losing two seats although forecast to lose five. With the Spanish Socialist Workers' Party (PSOE) taking 25 seats and Union, Progress and Democracy (UPyD) entering the Basque Parliament with one seat, parties not espousing Basque nationalism held the majority for the first time. The three parties elected the PSOE's Patxi López as Lehendakari.

In the 2012 Basque regional election, the PP lost three seats and declined to the fourth party in the region. Despite being asked by the national leadership to remain in charge until the 2015 local elections, he resigned the regional party leadership and his parliamentary seat in May 2013 to relocate to Mexico with his wife and three daughters, to return to banking with Santander México.
