= Basque Nationalist Republican Party =

Basque Nationalist Republican Party Euzkotar Erkal Abertzale Alderdia Partido Republicano Nacionalista Vasco Partido Nacionalista Liberal Vasco
- President: Pedro Sarasqueta
- Founded: 1911
- Dissolved: 1913
- Headquarters: San Sebastián
- Newspaper: Azkatasuna
- Ideology: Republicanism; Basque nationalism Social liberalism Federalism; Progressivism
- Political position: Centre-left
- Colours

The Basque Nationalist Republican Party (in Basque: Euzkotar Erkal Abertzale Alderdia; in Spanish: Partido Republicano Nacionalista Vasco) was a political party in Euskadi, Spain.

PRNV was founded in January 1911, as a progressive alternative to the conservative Basque Nationalist Party (PNV). PRNV was modelled after the Republican Nationalist Federal Union (UFNR) in Catalonia. The party dissolved in 1913.
