= Gorka Maneiro =

Spanish politician

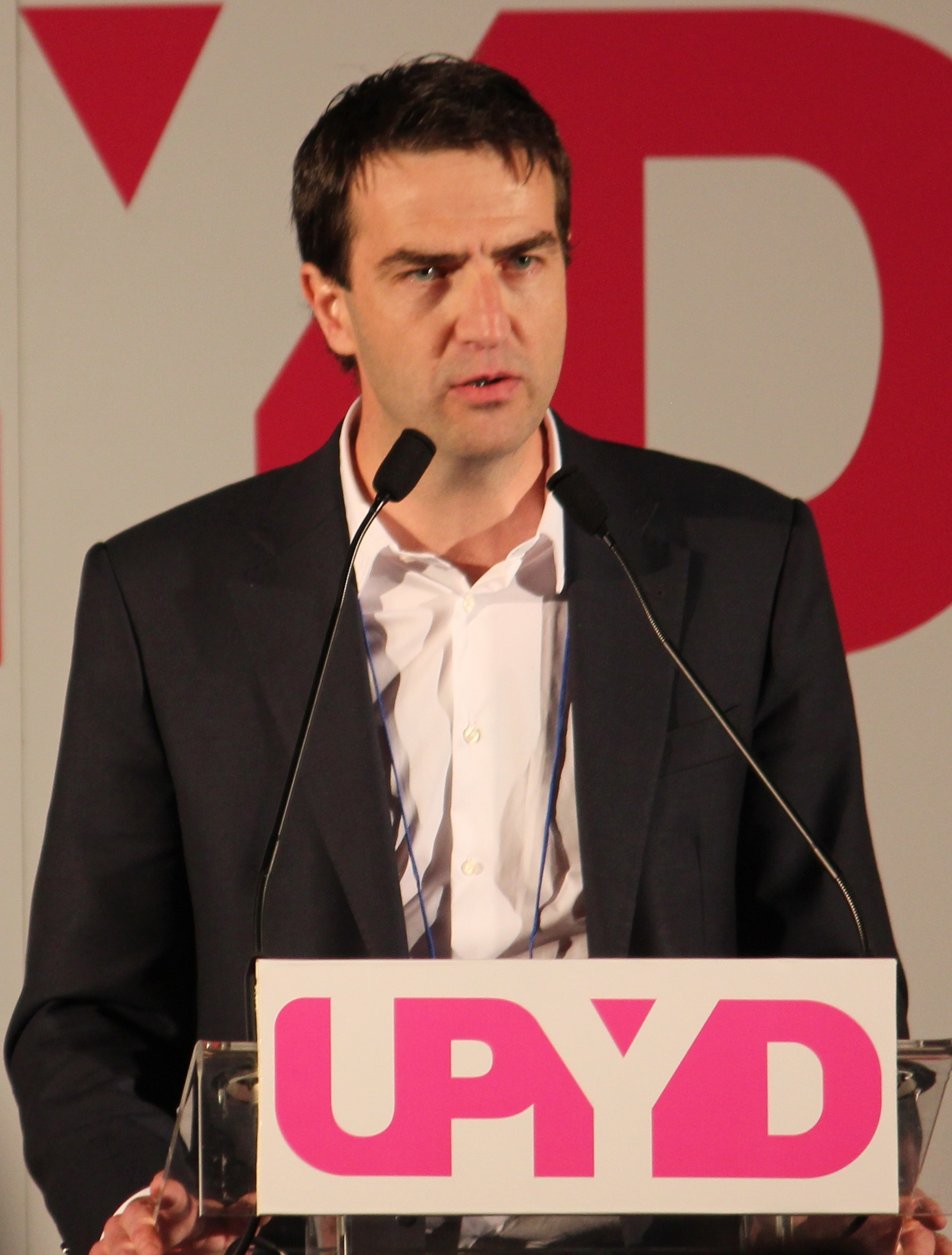

Spokesperson of Union, Progress and Democracy
- In office 2 April 2016 – 29 January 2017
- Preceded by: Andrés Herzog

Member of the Basque Parliament
- In office 3 April 2009 – 2 August 2016
- Constituency: Álava

Personal details
- Born: Gorka Maneiro Labayen; 11 November 1974 (age 51) San Sebastián, Guipúzcoa, Basque Country, Spain
- Party: Izquierda Española (since 2024); UPyD (2007–2017); PSOE (2002-2007)
- Occupation: Tax advisor
- Website: gorkamaneiro.es

Gorka Maneiro Labayen (born 1975 in San Sebastián) is a Spanish politician and a member of the Basque Parliament with the Union, Progress and Democracy party (UPyD).

He studied business sciences and is a technician in fiscality. A former member of the Spanish Socialist Workers' Party (PSOE) from 2002 to 2007, since 2009 he has been a member of the direction council of UPyD. He was in the group of members of the civic platform ¡Basta Ya! that entered in the new party. He was a candidate for Guipúzcoa in the 2008 general election with UPyD, and also to the Senate in 2011 for Álava.
