= Batasuna =

2001–2013 Basque political party in Spain

Unity Batasuna
- Spokesperson: Arnaldo Otegi
- Founded: 23 May 2001
- Dissolved: 3 January 2013
- Succeeded by: Sortu
- Headquarters: Avda. Marcelo Zelaieta, nº 75, Pamplona
- Ideology: Abertzale left
- Political position: Far-left

Batasuna (Basque pronunciation: [baˈtas̪uˌna]; English: Unity) was a Basque nationalist political party. Based mainly in Spain, it was banned in 2003, after a court ruling declared proven that the party was financing ETA with public money.

The party is included in the "European Union list of terrorist persons and organizations" as a component of ETA. Right after having been banned, Batasuna still managed to organize or support some rallies, public actions and several workplace strikes. The Spanish ruling was appealed before and, later on, confirmed by the European Court of Human Rights.

As an association and not as a political party, Batasuna had a minor presence in the French Basque Country, where it remained legal as "Batasuna" until its self-dissolution in January 2013.

Batasuna's ranks and support base have been represented under different names since it was first declared legal in the late 1970s with the Spanish Transition to democracy. Thus, Batasuna's predecessors were the original Herri Batasuna and, then, Euskal Herritarrok. After having been outlawed in 2003, Batasuna's core support revamped yet again by co-opting the thus far marginal parties EHAK and Acción Nacionalista Vasca (ANV).

Batasuna was a part of the Basque National Liberation Movement which includes social organizations, trade unions, youth (Jarrai and Gazteriak, now merged in Haika and Segi), and women's groups (Egizan). Jarrai-Haika-Segi, Gestoras pro-Amnistia, Askatasuna and other groups closely related to Batasuna were also declared illegal by different court rulings on the same charges of having collaborated with or being part of ETA.

== History and outline ==
The party was founded in April 1978 as Herri Batasuna, a coalition of leftist nationalist political groups mostly originating from Euskadiko Ezkerra initially brought together to advocate for "no" in the referendum to be held that year on the Spanish constitution.

Its constituent parties had been called together by senior Basque nationalist Telesforo de Monzón in a 1978 meeting called "the table of Alsasua." Herri Batasuna's founding convention was held in Lekeitio, home of Santiago Brouard who was then the leader of HASI (Herriko Alderdi Sozialista Iraultzailea or Revolutionary Socialist People's Party). The party won 150,000 votes in the Basque Country (15%) and 22,000 additional votes in Navarre (9%) in its first Spanish general election in March 1979. Thus, they won three seats in the Spanish Parliament, which they did not occupy. Same happened in 1980 in the first elections to the Basque Parliament, in which HB stood as second political force, with 151,636 votes (16.55%) winning 11 seats. Its absence allowed a BNP-only Basque Government led by Carlos Garaikoetxea. On 20 November 1984 Brouard was assassinated by two members of the GAL. The killing is perhaps the only one performed by the GAL death squad within Spain itself.

Another well-known Herri Batasuna leader and newly elected Spanish MP, Josu Muguruza, was assassinated by right-wing extremists in November 1989 in Madrid. GAL claimed responsibility for Muguruza's assassination. Suspicions also centered on Spanish neo-Nazi group Bases Autónomas.

== 1998 onwards ==
Amid the first talk of the Spanish government investigating the ties of Herri Batasuna with ETA, in 1998 Herri Batasuna was the driving force of the newly formed Euskal Herritarrok (We Basque Citizens) coalition, an acronym which got the best results to date for Basque left separatism in the Basque community, with 224,000 votes out of a total of 1,250,000 in the Basque election held that year.

The most recent public party spokesmen was Arnaldo Otegi. Otegi, like a number of other top-ranks in Herri Batasuna, had been a member of ETA and served several years in prison for bank assault.

Another important member of Batasuna was José Antonio Urrutikoetxea Bengoetxea, alias Josu Ternera, the main leader of ETA between 1987 and 1989 and accused of a number of assassinations like the 1987 Hipercor bombing which killed 21 people at Hipercor - a shopping center in Barcelona. He was imprisoned in France after 1989, released after finishing his sentence and was transferred to Spanish prisons, where he stayed for two more years until his release by the Constitutional Court, which stipulated that he had served his prison term in France. He was included in the Batasuna electoral ticket and elected to the Basque parliament between 1999 and 2001, where he was appointed as his party's representative in the Human Rights commission at the Basque Parliament, which, given his criminal background caused a stir in the rest of parties. He disappeared when the Spanish courts reopened cold charges and presented new ones about his current membership in ETA. Presently he lives in hiding and is considered one of the leaders of ETA that are pushing for negotiations.

Amid a period of separatist kale borroka street attacks on the offices of the Basque Nationalist Party and other establishment targets, Batasuna together with the union Langile Abertzaleen Batzordeak convoked a day of protest and general strike on 9 March 2006. On the morning of the strike, ETA detonated several bombs near highways, with no injuries. Employers reported scant overall participation in the strike, approximately 0.5% of private sector workers, 1% of government workers and 3–4% of workers in education. A few thousands of Batasuna militants joined protests, while others blocked rail lines and roads and occupied municipal halls Batasuna leader Arnaldo Otegi was ordered to appear in court to answer for the bomb attacks and disruption, but delayed his appearance repeatedly on the grounds of illness.

In September 2008, in what has been the closest to a disengagement of ETA so far, members of the party, while not condemning ETA's tactics whatsoever, did say the "political-military strategy" of the latter is an "obstacle" to aspirations for Basque independence. They called for a "unifying project for the pro-independence left" which would be aimed at creating an electoral list for regional elections to be held in Spring 2009.

== Electoral results ==
Batasuna's support in the elections to the parliament of the Basque Autonomous Community (under the three brands it has used, i.e., Herri Batasuna, Euskal Herritarrok and EHAK) oscillates around 15% of the total votes, its best result being the 18.33% achieved in 1990 and the lowest the 10.12% of the total votes obtained in 2001.

In Navarre its results in the elections to the Navarrese Foral parliament have been historically slightly less than 15% of the total votes, reaching their highest result in 1999 (15.95% of the total votes) and their lowest in 1995 (9.22% of the total votes). In this territory other Basque pro-independence left wing parties which reject violence and so remain legal - namely Batzarre and specifically, Aralar- eroded Batasuna's support in a more significant way than in the Basque Autonomous Community.

Batasuna had representatives in the European Parliament and in the parliaments of Navarre and the provinces of the Basque Autonomous Community. It also ruled some 62 local councils, and had members in many more. While it was fairly represented in all Basque and Navarrese Spanish territories, Batasuna counted as its stronghold the province of Gipuzkoa. After being banned, Batasuna lost all its representatives in the Spanish Parliament, since regaining (under different names) some their seats in elections held after its banning.

While the party has been barred from formally taking part in elections since 2003 (see below), it has coordinated a variety of forms of participation (or "quantifiable non-participation") in recent elections. After the May 2003 provincial and local elections, followers of the local lists protested claiming the council seats corresponding to the invalid votes (127,000, 10% of the total vote in the Basque Country). For the Basque elections of 2005, Batasuna presented lists of candidates but they were dismissed as illegal. After the new election was held for the Basque regional parliament, Batasuna lost all their remaining elected representatives.

Like those parties, representatives of EHAK refused to explicitly condemn the ETA attacks but, given the fact that elections were to be held in a matter of days, the courts did not have the time to assess EHAK's compliance with the Ley de Partidos. The People's Party requested that the Spanish government conducts investigations to ban EHAK-PCTV too, though the State Legal Service (Abogacía General del Estado) and the Attorney General's Office (Fiscalía General del Estado) found no evidence to support legal actions against the party. Batasuna asked their supporters to vote for EHAK.

In the Basque elections of 17 April 2005, EHAK obtained 150,188 votes (12.5%), entering the Basque Parliament with nine seats (all but one being women).

=== Spanish Parliament ===
Batasuna stood in a number of elections for the Spanish Parliament. They first stood in 1979 obtaining their best results in the Basque autonomous community where they polled 15% and won three seats. In Navarre they polled almost 9% but failed to win a seat.

They lost a seat in the 1982 election. Their high point came in the 1986 election where they won 5 seats, including one seat in Navarre, the only occasion in which they have won a seat there. They lost their Navarre seat in the 1989 election and lost a further two seats in the 1996 election, which overall proved to be the party's worst performance in terms of vote share. At provincial level, their best results came in Guipúzcoa where the party topped the poll in the 1989 general election.

== Outlawed in Spain ==
The party denied any links to ETA. However, proponents of the party's illegalization pointed to a coincidence of Batasuna and ETA's strategies. A significant number of Batasuna leaders have been imprisoned because of their activities in ETA. The party has never condemned any attack by ETA and its leaders have referred sometimes to the ETA members as 'Basque soldiers', and justified their actions: "ETA does not use the armed struggle as a mean to defend this or that political project but to give [the Basque Country] democratic channels that enable the popular will to be expressed in full freedom." It is also common to refer to ETA militants as Gudariak, soldiers in Basque language.

Since the 1980s, there had been talk of attempts to ban the party, which resulted in Batasuna frequently changing its name as part of the effort to avoid this, from the original Herri Batasuna, then becoming part of the Euskal Herritarrok coalition in the 1990s and, finally, Batasuna. Members of the Basque left consider the Spanish government's efforts against Batasuna and its successors to be part of an organized campaign targeting the social support for the independence movement. They point to government crackdowns against the newspaper Egin, the radio station Herri Irratia and the network of pubs that were gathering places for the independentist left.

In 2002, started the first serious attempt by the Spanish government to ban the party. In June, the parliament passed legislation that outlawed parties under certain conditions, on the grounds of their support for terrorism. In July Batasuna was fined €24 million for vandalism and street violence in 2001. Following an ETA car bomb attack on 4 August the Spanish parliament was recalled. The party was suspended for three years by Judge Baltasar Garzón on 27 August to allow him to investigate the party links to ETA. Garzón and the government presented 23 arguments for the ban, focusing on the party's refusal to condemn ETA attacks, its reference to detainees as political prisoners, collaboration with other banned abertzale forces, and ETA's support in communiqués for Batasuna's political strategy.

In 2003, Batasuna was declared illegal in Spain by a court ruling of the Spanish Supreme Court, then confirmed by the Constitutional Court of Spain. The decision automatically cut them off from the state funding received by all legal political parties with Parliament representation. In spite of legal text forbidding its reorganization under another name, its members tried to use, ever since the outlawing, a plethora of local lists. Most of these lists were considered to be a front for Batasuna by the Spanish Supreme Court. This decision was confirmed by the Spanish Constitutional Court. The ban prohibits their representatives from contesting elections, holding public demonstrations or rallies and freezes their assets. On the 26th the Spanish parliament voted for an indefinite ban, 295 to 10. The party's main offices in Pamplona were closed by the police and further offices in San Sebastián, Bilbao and Vitoria-Gasteiz were targeted.

Still, party activity did not cease completely, as proved by the fact that on 4 October 2007 twenty-three top members of Batasuna were arrested as they left a secret meeting in Segura (Guipúzcoa), accused of holding an illegal political meeting.

=== Schism ===
Prior to the outlaw effort, a dissenting minority had left the party to form Aralar. While sharing separatist aims with Batasuna, Aralar rejected political violence and ETA's assassinations and therefore remains a legal party.

== Attempts to reorganize ==
In spite of the prohibition of reorganizing under different names in order to circumvent the legal ruling, Batasuna's ranks have tried a series of attempts to reorganize under new names, which include, among others, Autodeterminaziorako Bilgunea, Aukera Guztiak, Askatasuna or D3M. All have been legally banned for alleged ties to Batasuna and, in turn, to ETA.

In May 2004, a list named Herritarren Zerrenda ("Citizens' List") was presented in Spain and France to the 2004 European Parliament election. Spanish tribunals rejected it, as a successor of Batasuna. However, the HZ list in France remained legal.

HZ candidates in Spain then campaigned for using the French HZ ballot in Spain, which was to be counted as a null vote. There were more than 98,000 null votes in the Basque Autonomous Country and more than 15,000 in Navarre. HZ leaders interpreted the high rate of null votes, which was 12% of the total, to mean that most of the nulls were for HZ, since in the previous European elections the null vote was less than 1%.

A more successful strategy for Batasuna proved to be the one of co-opting existing marginal parties giving the shortest possible notice before an election, so that there was no time for the Spanish Supreme Court to legally assess the lawfulness of this move before the election was held. Thus, for the regional 2005 Basque parliamentary election the so-far marginal EHAK party announced that they were ready to bring the programs of Batasuna to the Basque regional parliament. (EHAK had been legally registered in 2002 but had no known activity until 2005). The party could participate in those elections, but then was declared illegal by a court ruling because of ties with Batasuna, which prevented it from contesting the 2007 Spanish regional elections.

Then, the same strategy was tried by co-opting Acción Nacionalista Vasca a historical, yet basically inactive Basque party. This time, the Spanish Supreme Court could make a quick assessment of ANV's municipal candidates, which resulted in roughly half of them being banned (because the candidates included people who had previously run for the illegal Herri Batasuna or Batasuna) while the other half was ruled lawful and could participate in the elections to be held shortly after the ruling.

Then, in September 2008 the full legal inquiry on the party was finalized, ruling that ANV as a whole was illegal, due to ties with Batasuna-ETA. The Basque regional government, then led by a Basque nationalist coalition of the PNV and EA objected to these legal rulings.

As a result of this pressure, for the first time since Herri Batasuna was formed, neither Batasuna nor its proxies could participate in the Basque regional parliament at the time of the 2009 Basque parliamentary election.

In February 2011, Sortu, a party described as "the new Batasuna", was launched. Unlike predecessor parties, Sortu claimed that it explicitly rejected politically motivated violence, including that of ETA; however it did not condemn the record of ETA nor ask for the disbandment of the armed organization. Sortu was banned in March 2011 from registering as a political party by the Supreme Court of Spain.

Some members went on to form another party called Bildu, which was first banned but then allowed to register. Currently, it is Bildu which represents at the Parliament the electoral base of Batasuna.

== Reaction ==
In October 2008, demonstrations were held in Bilbao to protest a Supreme Court decision the month before to ban ANV and EHAK, because of their ties to Batasuna. The protesters had a banner that read "Freedom for Euskal Herria." The protests was organised by left-wing Basque nationalists. ANV president, Kepa Bereziartua, and the former spokesman for Batasuna, Arnaldo Otegi, were present in the march.

== Rulings of the European Court of Human Rights ==
At the time of its outlawing in Spain, Batasuna lawyers took the case to the European Court of Human Rights (ECHR). After a long legal inquiry, in July 2009 the ECHR backed the Spanish rulings banning Batasuna and its proxies.

The ECHR said that disbanding the parties was a response "to a pressing social need" given their ties to ETA. "Given the situation in Spain for several years regarding terrorist attacks, these ties can be considered objectively as a threat to democracy," the court said, also adding that these parties "contradicted the concept of a 'democratic society' and presented a major danger to Spain's democracy".

Similarly, when the outlawed Batasuna tried to use Acción Nacionalista Vasca as a proxy to re-organize its ranks, in a different case the ECHR also upheld in 2011 the previous Spanish court rulings which had outlawed ANV, noting that this party had not run by itself in elections since 1977 and that it basically conformed a "fraud" to circumvent the outlawing of Batasuna.

== Status in France ==
Batasuna has a minor presence in the Basque French country, where it runs elections as a civic organization, not like a political party. In France it used to get a few hundred votes and did not reach any kind of representation at either local or regional level so far.

In September 2008, 14 people were detained by the French police, 10 of whom were from the French-wing of the party (including their spokesman Xabi Larralde), and charged with links to ETA. They were released four days later; it remained unclear whether the ongoing investigation would lead to an illegalization process similar to that in Spain.

In January 2013, Batasuna in France announced its self-dissolution, citing a process of "political reflection".

== See also ==
- Herri Batasuna
- Julen Madariaga

== Bibliography ==
- Cabestan, Jean-Pierre; Pavković, Aleksandar (2013), Secessionism and Separatism in Europe and Asia: To Have a State of One's Own, Routledge, 246, ISBN 978-0-415-66774-6
- Bruni, Luigi; Giacopucci, Giovanni (1994). ETA: historia política de una lucha armada. Vol. 2. Txalaparta. ISBN 978-84-86597-70-2.
- Parissi, Julio (2008). Qué fue de ellos: El enigma de los etarras en el Uruguay. Planeta. ISBN 978-950-49-1471-6.
- Rees, Phil (2006). Dining with terrorists:meetings with the world's most wanted militants. Pan Macmillan. ISBN 978-0-330-43305-1.
- Fernández Soldevilla, Gaizka (2007). "El nacionalismo vasco radical ante la transición española". Historia contemporánea. 35: 817–844. ISSN 1130-2402. ""
- Casquete Badallo, Jesús María (2010). "Abertzale sí pero, ¿quién dijo que de izquierda?". El Viejo topo. 268. Bakeaz: 14–19. ISSN 0210-2706.
- Fernández Soldevilla, Gaizka (2010). "El compañero ausente y los aprendices de brujo: orígenes de Herri Batasuna (1974-1980)". Revista de Estudios Políticos. 148 (148): 71–103. ISSN 0048-7694.
