= Demokrazia Hiru Milioi =

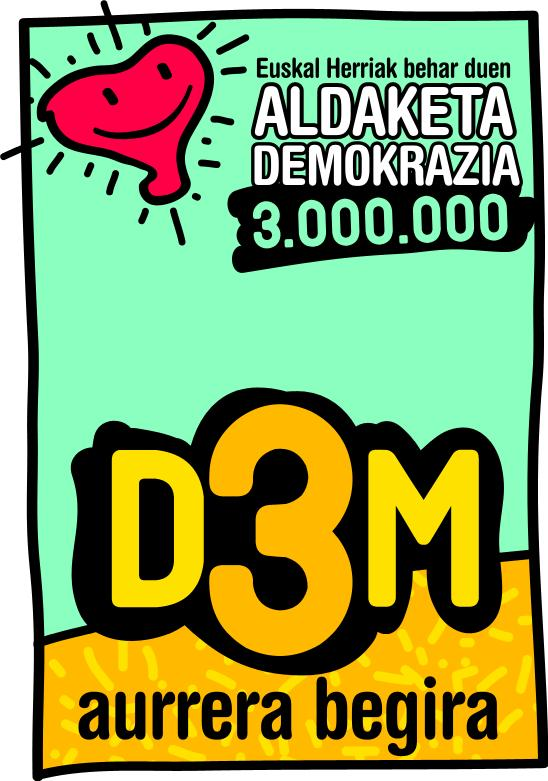
- Founded: January 10, 2009
- Dissolved: February 18, 2009
- Ideology: Basque nationalism Revolutionary socialism Ezker abertzalea Left-wing nationalism Basque independence Ecologism; Feminism
- Political position: Far-left

Demokrazia Hiru Milioi (Spanish: Democracia Tres Millones; D3M; also called Demokrazia 3,000,000) was an electoral platform which was formed to participate in the Basque Parliament elections in 2009. It was declared illegal on February 8, 2009, as the Supreme Court of Spain considered that it was linked with the separatist organization ETA.
