= Basque Nationalist Action =

Political party in Spain

Basque Nationalist Action Eusko Abertzale Ekintza / Acción Nacionalista Vasca
- Founded: 1930
- Banned: February 2008
- Newspaper: Acción Nacionalista (1932-1933); Tierra Vasca-Eusko Lurra (1933-1940, 1956-1976); Eusko Ekintza (2005-2008)
- Membership: Herri Batasuna (1978-2001)
- Ideology: Basque nationalism Basque independence Socialism; Left-wing nationalism Anticapitalism
- Political position: Left-wing

Party flag

Basque Nationalist Action (Basque: Eusko Abertzale Ekintza, Spanish: Acción Nacionalista Vasca, EAE–ANV) was a Basque nationalist party based in Spain. Founded in 1930, it was the first Basque nationalist political party to exist running on a socialist program. On 16 September 2008, the party was outlawed by the Spanish Supreme Court based on ties with ETA. The Spanish ruling was appealed to the European Court of Human Rights, which, after reviewing the question, upheld the Spanish courts on the matter.

== History ==
It was formed in 1930, upon the reunification of the ultraconservative Aberri group and the moderate majority Comunión Nacionalista Vasca in the Basque Nationalist Party, by those who refused to support the traditional clerical ideology of the party. Its support was restricted to urban middle class and, as such, was a minority party. ANV played a minor role during the Republic, when it usually aligned with left and republican parties (being even part of the Popular Front in 1936) and in the Civil War. It was a part of the Basque Government in Exile from 1936 to 1979, and of the Spanish Republican government in Exile from 1938 until 1946, represented by a minister without portfolio, Tomás Bilbao.

When democracy resumed in Spain, ANV run by itself for the first contemporary Spanish general election presenting candidates in Biscay and Gipuzkoa, achieving a meagre 0.64% of the total votes in the Basque country. During these years, ANV received compensation for the property seized after the war by the Francoist government.

After the 1977 election, ANV chose not to run for elections by itself but run in subsequent elections as a minor part of the electoral platforms of the Basque National Liberation Movement. It was not a part of KAS though. Thus, when the Basque independentist party, Batasuna, was banned by the Spanish Supreme Court in 2002 after government allegations of its close relationship to ETA, EAE-ANV remained as a legal party.

=== Rise to prominence ===
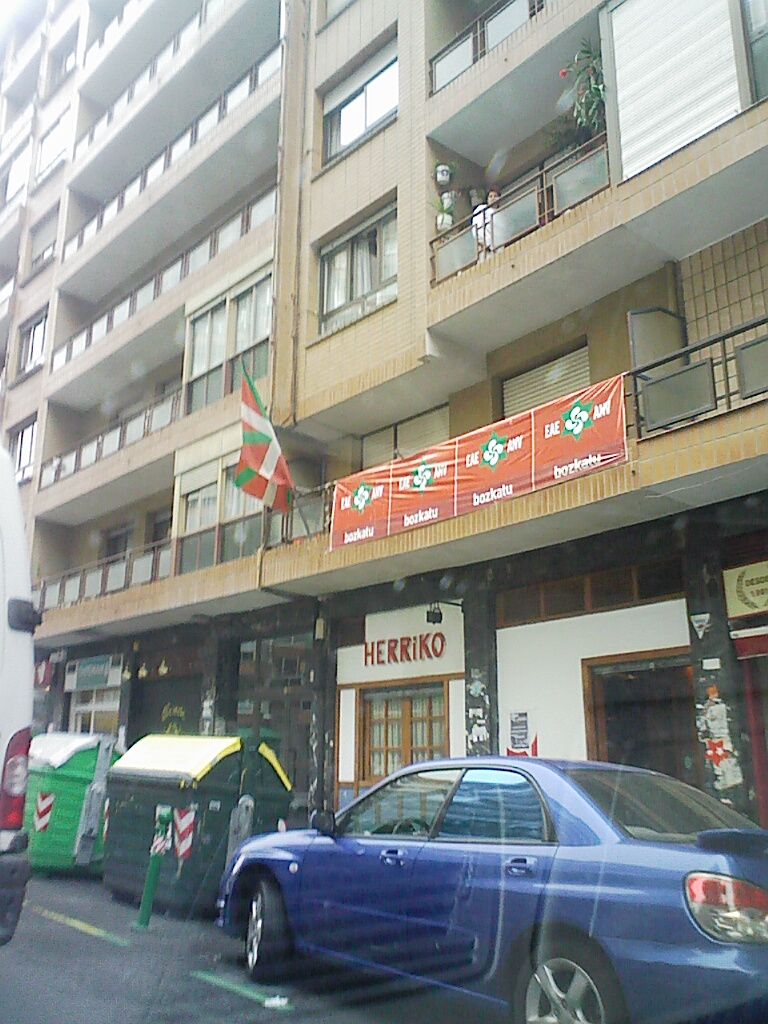
A nationalist bar in Bilbao showing banners urging people to vote for the EAE-ANV, 2007

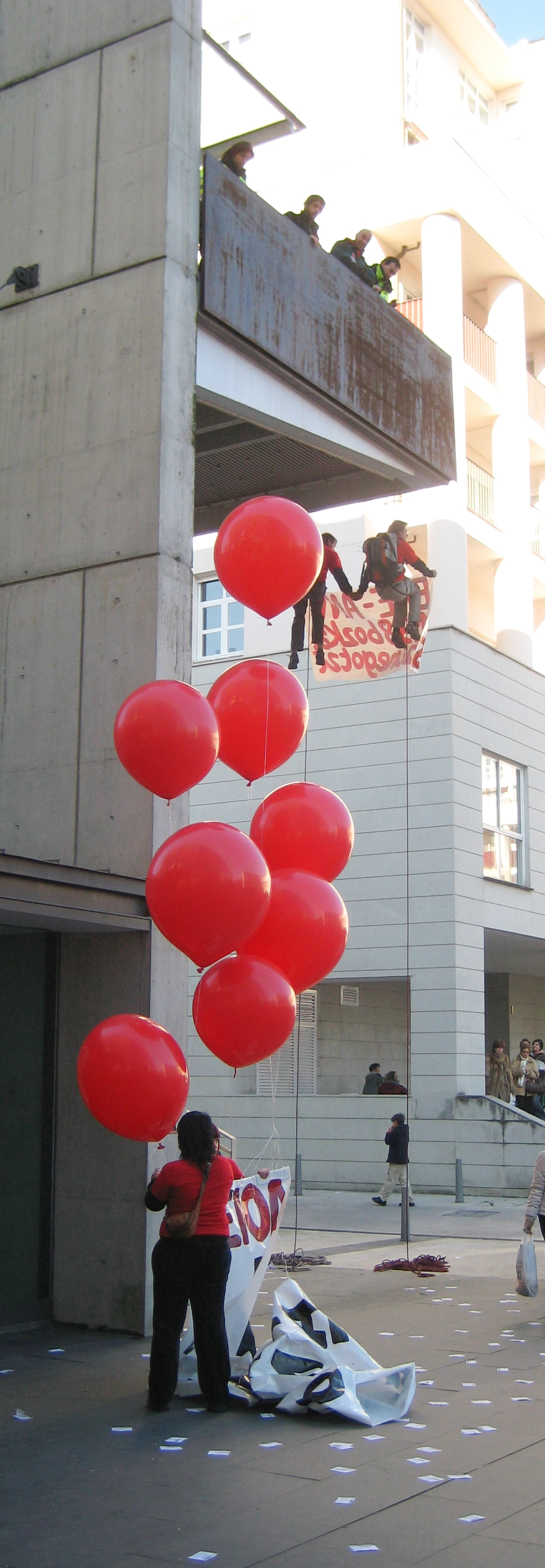
Protests against the rejection of the EAE list for the municipal election at Leioa, 2007.

The banning of Batasuna drew attention to the virtually unknown and inactive EAE-ANV as it was informally designated by Batasuna's ranks as the political heir of the illegalized Batasuna.

Consequently, it was during the 2007 municipal and provincial Spanish elections when the new EAE-ANV received intensive media and political attention. Nearly half of its lists were declared illegal prior to the elections, because a significant portion of the candidates on them had previously run for either Batasuna, EH or HB (different reincarnations of the same base). This was despite the fact those parties were legal when these candidates ran for them. The Supreme Court declared that those EAE-ANV lists were providing cover to an illegal party (Batasuna), and, therefore, those list including former Batasuna members were ineligible.

EAE-ANV only disclosed its intentions to run for those elections with the shortest possible legal notice. Thus, the legal assessment declaring some of the lists ineligible was made in a hurry, which also left little time (24 hours) for appeal on the part of the party. Some EAE-ANV members then claimed that a "presumption of guilt" was applied that remained to be properly proven in due time. However, EAE-ANV could take part in the elections with its legal lists, and received a grand total of some 187,000 votes (those votes for lists declared ineligible prior to the elections were declared null). Among the illegal lists were those of Bilbao, San Sebastián and Vitoria; but not those of Pamplona city council, where EAE-ANV has two representatives.

=== Current status ===
In February 2008, the Spanish government declared EAE-ANV illegal as a precautionary measure to prevent them from taking part in the year's general election. This suspension was later on confirmed by the Spanish Supreme Court declaring EAE-ANV illegal. The case was taken by the defendants to the European Court of Human Rights, which upheld the Spanish court rulings stating that the EAE-ANV candidatures were, in effect, a "fraud" constructed to circumvent the previous outlawing of Batasuna.

Despite the fact that the party was declared illegal, the court ruling was not retroactive, which meant that those elected members of EAE-ANV remained in their positions as city councilors until the next Spanish local election was held in 2011.

== See also ==
- Basque nationalism
- Baltasar Garzón
- Herri Batasuna
- Arantza Urkaregi
