= Abertzale left =

Form of left-wing nationalism among Basques

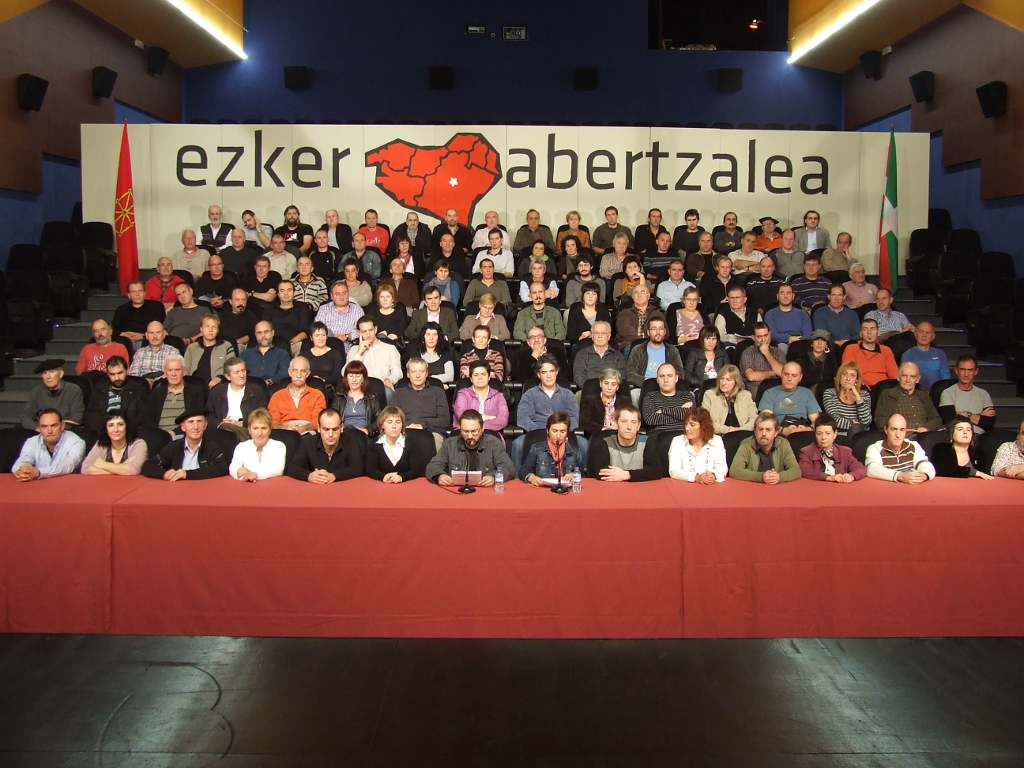
Meeting in 2009

Interview with Arnaldo Otegi (2009), a leading figure of the Basque nationalist left

Abertzale left (Basque: Ezker abertzalea, Spanish: Izquierda abertzale; lit. 'patriotic left') is a term used to refer to the parties or organizations of the Basque nationalist/separatist left, stretching from democratic socialism to communism.

This leftist character is highlighted in contrast to the traditional jeltzale nationalism represented by the Basque Nationalist Party (EAJ-PNV), a conservative and Christian-democratic party, which has long been the largest in the Basque Country. The first examples of abertzale parties are the Basque Nationalist Republican Party (EAAE-PRNV), active from 1909 to 1913, and the Basque Nationalist Action (EAE-ANV), active from 1930 to 2008. They represented the non-confessional Basque nationalist references when ETA was formed in 1959 by younger generations. Ezker abertzalea (or, in Spanish, izquierda abertzale) is notably used when referring to the leftist-nationalist environment of Batasuna, an outlawed political party.

More recently, in 1986, a left-wing splinter group of EAJ-PNV led by Carlos Garaikoetxea formed a new social-democratic party, Basque Solidarity (EA). After ETA's permanent ceasefire (2010), EA engaged in a convergence process with the scattered historic Basque nationalist left closer to ETA. In 2011–2012, they joined forces in forming a succession of coalitions: Bildu, Amaiur and, finally, EH Bildu. A group of former members of Batasuna were identified by the media as independents of izquierda abertzale.
