= Iñaki Ruiz de Pinedo =

Spanish politician (born 1954)

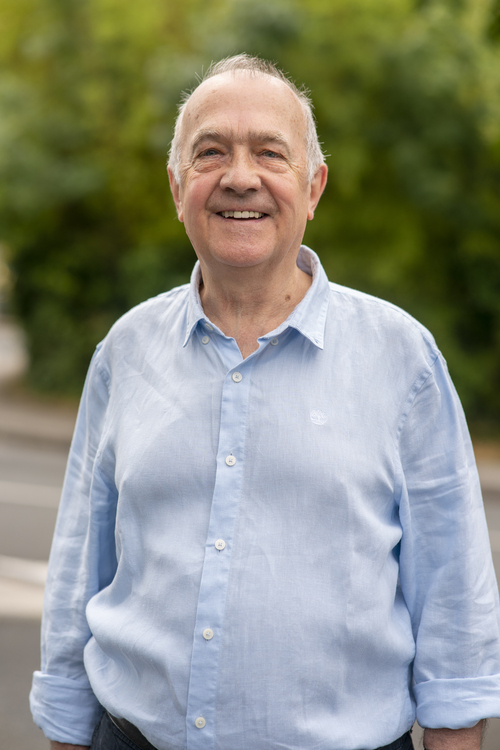

Member of the Congress of Deputies of Spain
- Incumbent
- Assumed office 14 May 2019
- Constituency: Araba

Member of the Basque Parliament
- In office 31 March 1980 – 30 August 1994
- Constituency: Araba

Member of Vitoria-Gasteiz Municipal Council
- In office 1987–1995
- In office 1999–2000
- Succeeded by: José Mª López de Arbina García

Personal details
- Born: Iñaki Ruiz de Pinedo Undiano; 23 July 1954 (age 72) Gasteiz, Basque Country, Spain
- Party: EH Bildu
- Education: University of Deusto
- Occupation: Sociologist

Iñaki Ruiz de Pinedo Undiano (born 23 July 1954) is a Spanish sociologist, politician and a member of the Congress of Deputies of Spain. He was previously a member of the Basque Parliament.

== Early life ==
Ruiz de Pinedo was born on 23 July 1954 in Gasteiz, Basque Country. He is the son of Jeus and Edelmira, clothing traders from Gasteiz. He has two brothers, Josu and Julen.

Ruiz de Pinedo was educated at Colegio San José and Ramiro de Maeztu high school in Gasteiz. He has a degree in social sciences from the University of Deusto.

== Career ==
Ruiz de Pinedo is a sociologist. He was affiliated with the Basque Nationalist Party (EAJ) in his youth but later, whilst a student in Bilbao, he became a member of the People's Socialist Revolutionary Party (HASI), a banned Basque political party generally believed to be the political wing of the separatist ETA. At HASI's first congress he was elected to the party's board.

Ruiz de Pinedo was a founding member of Herri Batasuna (HB) electoral alliance. Ruiz de Pinedo contested the 1980 regional election as a HB candidate in the Province of Araba and was elected to the Basque Parliament. Ruiz de Pinedo, along with Jokin Gorostidi, Miguel Castells and other elected representatives of HB, were arrested in 1981 for singing Eusko Gudariak during an address by King Juan Carlos at the Gernikako Batzarretxea.

Ruiz de Pinedo and Jon Idigoras were arrested in December 1983 for "supporting terrorism" following a gathering at Los desayunos del Ritz at which they made statements justifying the ETA's armed separatism and supporting Basque independence. The Audiencia Nacional released the pair after ruling that it wasn't competent to hear cases against members of the Basque Parliament. In December 1985 the Supreme Court convicted Ruiz de Pinedo and Idigoras of "supporting terrorism" and sentenced them to one year in prison and fined them 100,000 pesetas.

Ruiz de Pinedo was re-elected at the 1984, 1986 and 1990 regional elections. Despite being a member of the Basque Parliament he did not attend parliament until 1987 when HB's stance on the parliament changed. He was HB's spokesperson in parliament from 1987 to 1994. He left HASI in May 1988 after the party's leadership changed.

Ruiz de Pinedo contested the 1987 local elections as a HB candidate in Vitoria-Gasteiz and was elected. He was re-elected at the 1991 local elections. He was a member of HB's National Board (Mahai Nazionaleko) from 1982 to 1996 when he left the party over differences in its direction and quit politics. In 1996 Ruiz de Pinedo and Rosa Delaasunciónekin founded Zero Tailer Soziologikoa S.L.

Ruiz de Pinedo returned to politics in 1998 when at the 1998 regional election he was placed 5th on the Euskal Herritarrok (EH) electoral alliance's list of candidates in the province of Araba but the alliance only managed to win three seats in the province and as a result he failed to get re-elected to the Basque Parliament. He contested the 1999 local elections as an EH candidate in Vitoria-Gasteiz and was re-elected. He resigned from Zero Tailer Soziologikoa in 1999 after being elected to the municipal council. He resigned from the municipal council in 2000 due to differences with the EH leadership over the party's stance on ETA. He left politics in 2000 and from 2001 to 2005 he carried out research on the social need of prisoners for the University of the Basque Country. He joined Invesco-Mirugain in 2005 as a research co-ordinator, specialising in poverty, prison and racism.

Ruiz de Pinedo contested the 2019 general election as an EH Bildu electoral alliance candidate in the Province of Araba and was elected to the Congress of Deputies.

== Personal life ==
Ruiz de Pinedo is married and has two children, Jon and Haizea.

== Electoral history ==
Electoral history of Iñaki Ruiz de Pinedo
| Election | Constituency | Party | Alliance | No. | Result |
|---|---|---|---|---|---|
| 1980 regional | Province of Araba | People's Socialist Revolutionary Party | Herri Batasuna | 2 | Elected |
| 1984 regional | Province of Araba | People's Socialist Revolutionary Party | Herri Batasuna | 1 | Elected |
| 1986 regional | Province of Araba | People's Socialist Revolutionary Party | Herri Batasuna | 1 | Elected |
| 1987 local | Vitoria-Gasteiz | People's Socialist Revolutionary Party | Herri Batasuna | 1 | Elected |
| 1990 regional | Province of Araba | | Herri Batasuna | 1 | Elected |
| 1991 local | Vitoria-Gasteiz | | Herri Batasuna | 1 | Elected |
| 1998 regional | Province of Araba | | Euskal Herritarrok | 5 | Not elected |
| 1999 local | Vitoria-Gasteiz | | Euskal Herritarrok | 1 | Elected |
| 2019 general | Province of Araba | | EH Bildu | 1 | Elected |
