= Euskal Herriko Alderdi Sozialista =

Euskal Herriko Alderdi Sozialista Basque Socialist Party
- Leader: Manex Goienetxe; Santiago Brouard
- Founded: 1975
- Dissolved: 1977 (Spain); 1981 (France)
- Merger of: Herriko Alderdi Sozialista; Eusko Alderdi Sozialista
- Merged into: Herri Alderdi Sozialista Iraultzailea
- Newspaper: Euskaldunak
- Paramilitary wing: ETA(m)
- Ideology: Basque independence Revolutionary socialism Marxism-Leninism; Abertzale Left
- Political position: Radical left
- National affiliation: Koordinadora Abertzale Sozialista

Euskal Herriko Alderdi Sozialista (English: Socialist Party of the Basque Country; EHAS) was an illegal Marxist-Leninist Basque political party, with presence in both Spanish Basque Country and the French Basque Country.

== History ==
EHAS was formed as the merge of the Spanish-Basque Eusko Alderdi Sozialista and the French-Basque Herriko Alderdi Sozialista, being the first Basque party with presence at both sides of the border. The party participated in various unitary movements, like Euskal Erakunde Herritarra (coordination body of both independentist and non-independentist Basque socialists and communists) and the Koordinadora Abertzale Sozialista. The party also signed the Brest Charter in 1975.

In 1977 the party merged with Eusko Sozialistak, a small socialist party critical with ETA(m), to create Herri Alderdi Sozialista Iraultzailea (HASI). In Iparralde the party continued to exist, and presented candidacies to various elections. Manex Goienetxe was the French-Basque leader of the party, that maintained a strong relationship with the Breton Democratic Union.
