= PSRP =

PSRP may refer to:

- (Pyruvate, water dikinase)-phosphate phosphotransferase, an enzyme
- (Pyruvate, water dikinase) kinase, an enzyme
- People's Socialist Revolutionary Party
