= Doris Benegas =

Spanish political lawyer

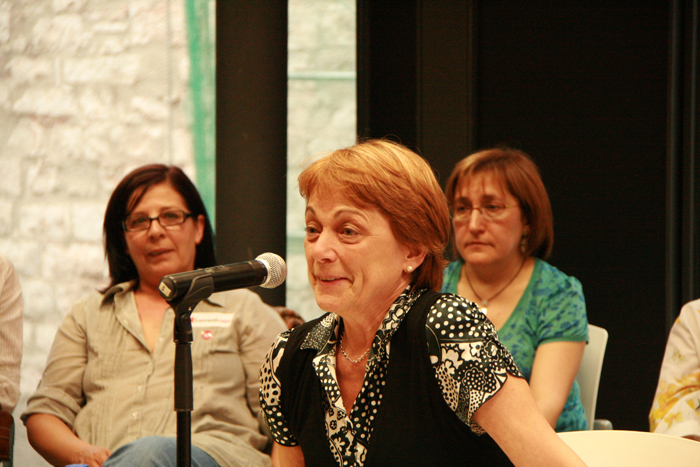
- Doris Benegas during a rally in Barcelona, 2009
- Born: Doris Benegas Haddad; 1951; Caracas, Venezuela
- Died: 29 July 2016 (aged 64–65); Valladolid, Spain
- Occupations: Lawyer, politician
- Known for: Leader of the Izquierda Castellana party
- Political party: Castilian Left
- Children: 1
- Parent(s): José Benegas-Echeverría; Doris Haddad
- Relatives: José María Benegas (brother)

Doris Benegas Haddad (1951 – 29 July 2016) was a Spanish political lawyer specialising in criminal law, particularly causes related to women and left-wing politics. She was also a political leader, leading a regional branch of the communist movement in the 1970s as well as the pro-independence nationalist leftist coalition, the Castilian Left, from 2002 to her death in 2016.

== Early life ==
Benegas was born in Caracas, Venezuela, in 1951. Her father was José María Benegas Echeverría, an exiled Basque Nationalist politician, who fled Spain in 1939 following the victory of General Francisco Franco in the Spanish Civil War. Her mother was Doris Haddad, a Lebanese-Jewish woman who migrated from Lebanon to Venezuela. In 1956 the family moved back to Echeverría's home region, the Basque Country. In 1964, she left home to attend high school in Bayonne, in French Basque Country, returning to Spain in 1969 to begin studying law at the University of the Basque Country in San Sebastian. In 1972, Benegas moved to Valladolid and started working in the FASA-Renault car factory. There she participated in workers' strikes and industrial action, and subsequently lost her job for her involvement in these activities. She also joined the communist movement and as a result came under police surveillance. In May 1973, she was arrested for her political activism.

Benegas completed her law degree and joined the Bar in Valladolid in 1975.

== Career ==
=== Legal career ===
Once qualified, Benegas opened a law office in Valladolid. Her legal work was mainly in criminal law, and in cases concerning gender violence, abortion, drug trafficking and defending leftist political activists. She also defended victims of the colza oil intoxication. She represented the families of people shot during Franco's regime, and she was in favour of Basque independence and actively supported Basque ETA prisoners. She was also well known for her commitment to women's social causes - in 1993, she co-founded the Association of Women Lawyers of Valladolid, and in 1994 the Association of Assistance to Victims of Sexual Assault and Child Abuse. She also founded the Association of Women Jurists and the feminist collective Women of Valladolid. In 1996, she spoke at the 10th Congress of Women Lawyers on the subject "The new criminal code and protection of the rights of women".

In later years, she was associated with organisations assisting the terminally ill and people who were evicted. Her work for the latter cause was through the Valladolid branch of the organisation Stop Desahucios ("Stop Evictions").

=== Political activity ===
After completing her law studies, Benegas became the leader of the Communist Movement in Castile and León. In 1976, she worked with others to organise a public commemoration of Castile and León Day, a day which celebrates Castilian nationalism. About 400 people gathered at the village of Villalar de los Comuneros, and were violently dispersed by the Guardia Civil. The following year almost 20,000 people attended commemorations.

In 1983, she was a key figure in the formation of the Castilian Popular Unity party. In 2000, this party merged with others to become the Castilian Left party, and Benegas was its leader from 2002 until her death in 2016.

Benegas was a candidate for Mayor of Valladolid twice, in 1979 and 1983, representing the Unidad Popular-People's Revolutionary Party.

In 2012, Benegas was arrested on suspicion of organising an anti-government demonstration, Rodea el Congreso (Surround the Congress). In September 2014, she and Luis Campo sued the government delegate in Madrid, Cristina Cifuentes, and the Director General of Police, Ignacio Cosidó, for banning the display of republican symbols during King Philip VI's proclamation. The following month, Benegas, Campo and another protester were arrested at an anti-monarchy demonstration in Madrid and held in custody for 24 hours. Benegas claimed that they were arrested and detained in retaliation for the complaint filed against Cifuentes and Cosidó.

== Family ==
Her brother Txiki Benegas was elected for several terms to represent Basque circumscriptions at the Spanish Cortes in the lists of the Basque branch of the Spanish Socialist Workers Party. However their relation was broken before the 1978 democratization. While Txiki was in ETA's target list, she defended ETA prisoners. His son (Doris' nephew) is the Spanish musician and songwriter Pablo Benegas, guitarist in the group La Oreja de Van Gogh. Their sister Ana Benegas was also a songwriter

The Basque nationalist politician Iñaki Anasagasti, also born in Venezuela, was a family friend in the 1950s.

Her husband Luis Ocampo was general secretary of Castilian Left.

== Death ==
Benegas died in Valladolid on 29 July 2016, following several months of illness from an abdominal tumour. She was survived by a daughter.
