= Eusko Alderdi Sozialista =

Eusko Alderdi Sozialista Basque Socialist Party
- Founded: 1974
- Dissolved: 1975
- Merged into: Euskal Herriko Alderdi Sozialista
- Paramilitary wing: ETA(m)
- Ideology: Basque independence Revolutionary socialism Marxism-Leninism; Abertzale Left; Antifascism
- Political position: Radical left

Eusko Alderdi Sozialista (English: Basque Socialist Party; EAS) was an underground Marxist-Leninist Basque political party.

== History ==
ETA(m) considered that armed struggle and mass struggle should be independent and clearly separated, unlike their rivals of ETA (pm) that considered that political and armed struggle were the same. In line with this idea, ETA (m) created a political party composed only of civilians that should participate and/or lead the mass struggle in Euskal Herria. The party participated in the social unrest that existed in the Basque Country during the last years of Francoism.

The party disappeared in 1975 when it merged with their Basque-French counterparts of Herriko Alderdi Sozialista, to form Euskal Herriko Alderdi Sozialista, the first Basque party at both sides of the border.
