= Ahora Castilla =

Political pact by Castilian nationalist political parties

Ahora Castilla (Castile now in English) was a political pact signed by a string of Castilian nationalist political parties and associations whose primary aim was to found a political platform. The signatory groups were: Tierra Comunera (currently Castilian Party), Castilian Left, Castilian Soup and Castilian Land. This pact was embodied in form of a manifesto known as The Manifesto of Alcalá de Henares, because it was publicly presented in the city of Alcalá de Henares, (Spain).

These political parties and associations intended to bring Castilian nationalism together in order to advance to their basic political goals, in fact the manifesto only expounds the basic principles of Castilian nationalism to rally all Castilian nationalistic groups. This pact intended to be a kind of milestone to create a political platform to run for the regional election in 2007. Nowadays this political initiative is no longer active.

== Ideology ==
The manifesto is a summary of the basic principles of the Castilian nationalism ideology. Actually they did not offer anything new to the movement, they just wanted to make an agreement in order to run for the regional election in some Spanish regions in 2007. The main ideas of the manifesto were:

- Contriving political initiatives and projects intending to achieve the unification of Castile (the fundamental idea of Castilian nationalism)
- Reactivating the project of Council of Castilian Autonomous Communities signed in 2000 by the following former Spanish regional presidents (Mr Alberto Ruiz-Gallardón from the region of Madrid, Mr Juan José Lucas from the region of Castile and León, and Mr José Bono from the region of Castile-La Mancha).The original idea was to create a Council intending to foster inter-regional cooperation, however this project never materialized.
- Recovering the old historic regional boundaries and repealing the current provincial ones. They thought this idea could be helpful to achieve the unification of Castile.
- Recovering, publicizing, fostering the Castilian regional identity to thence foment a Castilian national awareness in the Castilian Autonomous Communities.
- Recovering Castilian culture and folklore as well as protecting the historic and cultural heritage and the environment.
- Giving Castile as a whole its importance within Spain
- Creating a political platform to bring all Castilian nationalism together to reach these objectives, but at the same time respecting the ideologic plurality of the coalition members.

== See also ==
- Castilian nationalism
