= Izquierda Comunera =

Izquierda Comunera Comunero Left
- Leader: Collective leadership
- Founded: 2001
- Dissolved: 2002
- Headquarters: Madrid
- Youth wing: Castilian Revolutionary Youth
- Ideology: Libertarian socialism Left-wing Nationalism; Feminism; Castilian nationalism Anti-fascism; Communism; Anti-imperialism
- National affiliation: Castilian Left
- Women organization: Mujeres Castellanas
- Colours: Purple

Party flag
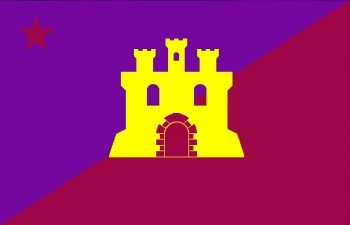

Website
- www.izco.org www.castilla-comunera.es

Izquierda Comunera (English: Comunero Left, UPC) is a leftist nationalist political party active in the Spanish Community of Madrid. It defended the national recognition of Castile and its independence. The party is also defined as socialist, antifascist, feminist and republican.

== History ==
IzCa was founded in Madrid in 2001 by ex-members of Tierra Comunera. In 2002, IzCo joined Unidad Popular Castellana, Partido Comunista del Pueblo Castellano and Círculo Castellano de Toledo to form Castilian Left.
