= 1980 Basque regional election =

Election in the Spanish region of the Basque Country

- 9 March 1980

All 60 seats in the Basque Parliament 31 seats needed for a majority
- Opinion polls
- Registered: 1,554,527
- Turnout: 929,051 (59.8%)
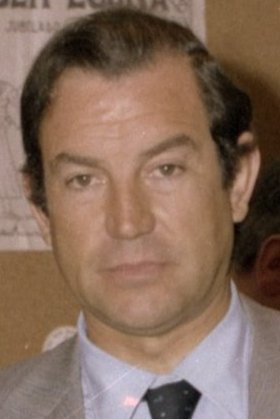

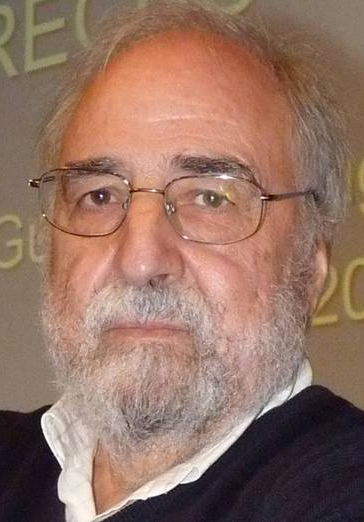

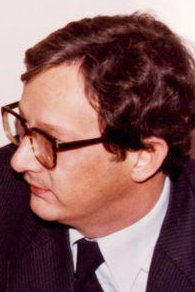

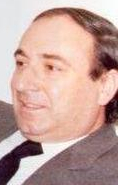

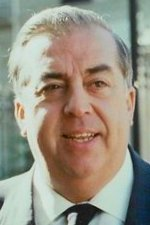

	First party	Second party	Third party
Leader	Carlos Garaikoetxea	Francisco Letamendia	Txiki Benegas
Party	EAJ/PNV	HB	PSE–PSOE
Leader since	April 1977	27 January 1980	26 February 1978
Leader's seat	Guipúzcoa	Biscay	Guipúzcoa
Seats won	25	11	9
Popular vote	349,102	151,636	130,221
Percentage	38.0%	16.5%	14.2%
	Fourth party	Fifth party	Sixth party
Leader	Juan María Bandrés	Jesús María Viana	Florencio Aróstegui
Party	EE	UCD	AP
Leader since	1979	1978	1980
Leader's seat	Guipúzcoa	Álava	Biscay
Seats won	6	6	2
Popular vote	89,953	78,095	43,751
Percentage	9.8%	8.5%	4.8%
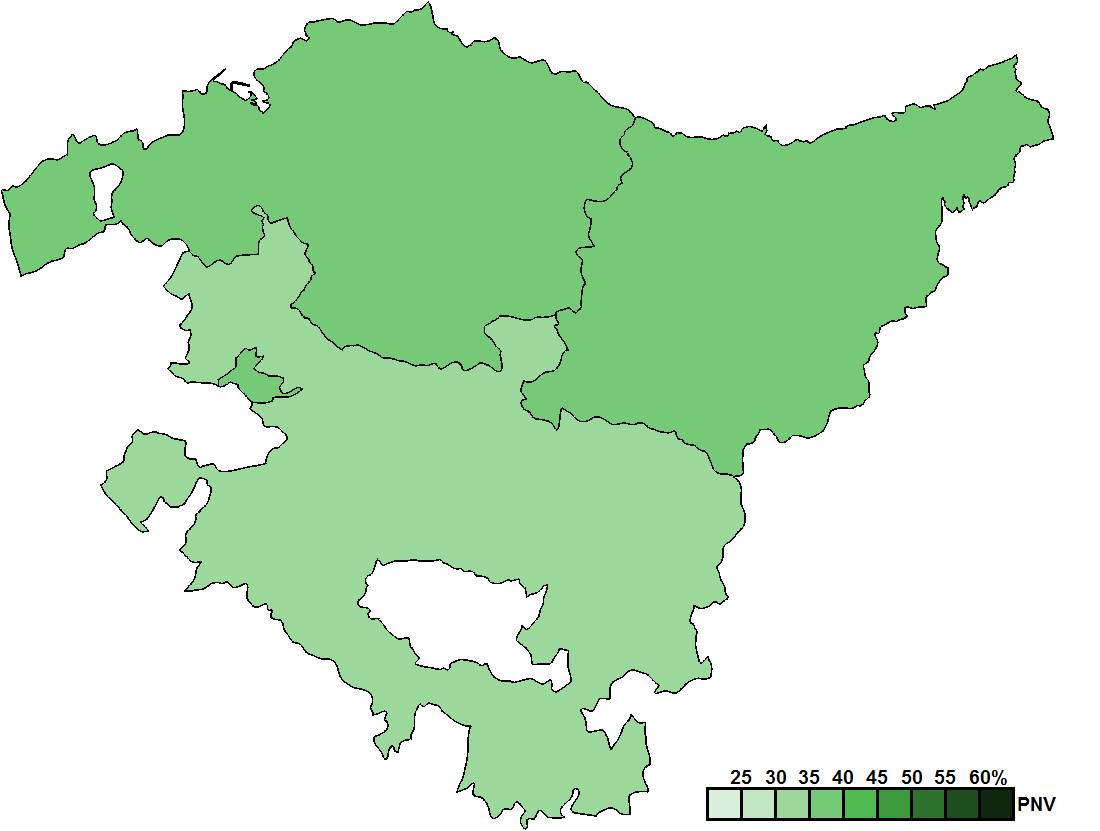
Lehendakari before election
Carlos Garaikoetxea
EAJ/PNV
Lehendakari after election
Carlos Garaikoetxea
EAJ/PNV

A regional election was held in the Basque Country on 9 March 1980 to elect the 1st Parliament of the autonomous community. All 60 seats in the Parliament were up for election.

The Basque Nationalist Party (EAJ/PNV) emerged as the largest party with 25 seats, followed by People's Unity (HB) with 11 seats and the Socialist Party of the Basque Country (PSE–PSOE) with nine seats. Basque Country Left (EE) and the ruling party in Spain, the Union of the Democratic Centre (UCD), secured six seats each, with other parties securing parliamentary representation including the right-wing People's Alliance (AP), with two seats, and the Communist Party of the Basque Country (PCE/EPK) with one seat. No party secured an absolute majority in parliament. Voter turnout was 929,051 (59.8%) from an electorate of 1,554,527.

Following the election, the newly elected parliament proceeded to re-elect Carlos Garaikoetxea as lehendakari.

== Overview ==
Under the 1979 Statute of Autonomy, the Basque Parliament was the unicameral legislature of the Basque Autonomous Community, having legislative power in devolved matters, as well as the ability to grant or withdraw confidence from a lehendakari. The electoral and procedural rules were supplemented by national law provisions (which were those used in the 1977 general election).

=== Date ===
The Basque General Council was required to call an election to the Basque Parliament within 60 days from the enactment of the Statute, with election day taking place within four months after the call. The Statute was published in the Official State Gazette on 22 December 1979, setting the latest possible date for election day on 20 May 1980.

The Basque Parliament could not be dissolved before the expiration date of parliament, except in the event of an investiture process failing to elect a lehendakari within a 60-day period period from the Parliament's reconvening. In such a case, the Parliament was to be automatically dissolved and a snap election called.

Initially, 24 February or 2 March 1980 were considered as the most likely dates for the election to be held, but on 22 December 1979 it was announced that it would be called for 9 March. The election to the Basque Parliament was officially called on 12 January 1980 with the publication of the corresponding decree in the Official Gazette of the Basque Country, setting election day for 9 March.

=== Electoral system ===
Voting for the Parliament was based on universal suffrage, comprising all Spanish nationals over 18 years of age, registered in the Basque Country and with full civil and political rights.

The Basque Parliament had 60 seats in its first election. All were elected in three multi-member constituencies—corresponding to the provinces of Álava, Biscay and Guipúzcoa, each of which was assigned a fixed number of 25 seats to provide for an equal parliamentary representation of the three provinces—using the D'Hondt method and closed-list proportional voting, with a three percent-threshold of valid votes (including blank ballots) in each constituency. The use of this electoral method resulted in a higher effective threshold depending on district magnitude and vote distribution.

The law did not provide for by-elections to fill vacant seats; instead, any vacancies arising after the proclamation of candidates and during the legislative term were filled by the next candidates on the party lists or, when required, by designated substitutes.

== Parties and candidates ==
The electoral law allowed for parties and federations registered in the interior ministry, alliances and groupings of electors to present lists of candidates. Parties and federations intending to form an alliance were required to inform the relevant electoral commission within 15 days of the election call, whereas groupings of electors needed to secure the signature of at least one permille—and, in any case, 500 signatures—of the electorate in the constituencies for which they sought election, disallowing electors from signing for more than one list.

Below is a list of the main parties and alliances which contested the election:

Candidacy	Parties and alliances	Leading candidate	Ideology	Gov.	Ref.
EAJ/PNV	List: Basque Nationalist Party (EAJ/PNV)	Carlos Garaikoetxea	Basque nationalism Christian democracy Conservative liberalism	Yes	
PSE–PSOE	List: Socialist Party of the Basque Country (PSE–PSOE)	Txiki Benegas	Social democracy	Yes	
UCD	List: Union of the Democratic Centre (UCD)	Jesús María Viana	Christian democracy Social democracy Liberalism	Yes	
HB	List: People's Socialist Revolutionary Party (HASI); Basque Nationalist Action (EAE/ANV); Patriotic Socialist Committees (ASK)	Francisco Letamendia	Basque independence Abertzale left Revolutionary socialism	No	
EE	List: Basque Country Left (EE)	Juan María Bandrés	Basque nationalism Socialism	Yes	
AP	List: People's Alliance (AP)	Florencio Aróstegui	Conservatism; National conservatism	No	

== Opinion polls ==
The tables below list opinion polling results in reverse chronological order, showing the most recent first and using the dates when the survey fieldwork was done, as opposed to the date of publication. Where the fieldwork dates are unknown, the date of publication is given instead. The highest percentage figure in each polling survey is displayed with its background shaded in the leading party's colour. If a tie ensues, this is applied to the figures with the highest percentages. The "Lead" column on the right shows the percentage-point difference between the parties with the highest percentages in a poll.

=== Voting intention estimates ===
The table below lists weighted voting intention estimates. Refusals are generally excluded from the party vote percentages, while question wording and the treatment of "don't know" responses and those not intending to vote may vary between polling organisations. When available, seat projections determined by the polling organisations are displayed below (or in place of) the percentages in a smaller font; 31 seats were required for an absolute majority in the Basque Parliament.

Polling firm/Commissioner	Fieldwork date	Sample size	Turnout	PNV	PSE–PSOE	UCD	HB	EE	PCE/EPK	AP	Lead
1980 regional election	9 Mar 1980	—N/a	59.8	38.0; 25	14.2; 9	8.5; 6	16.5; 11	9.8; 6	4.0; 1	4.8; 2	21.5
ABC	27 Feb 1980	?	?	? 19	? 7	? 12/13	? 9	? 8/9	? 1	? 0	?
Europa Press	26 Feb 1980	?	?	? 19	? 12	? 13	? 8	? 5	? 1	? 2	?
ABC	25 Feb 1980	?	?	? 19/20	?	? 13/14	? 6/7	? 7/8	?	?	?
Diario 16	30 Jan 1980	?	?	? 18/22	? 10/13	? 12/16	? 7/11	? 5/7	? 1/3	? 1/4	?
1979 foral elections	3 Apr 1979	—N/a	61.9	37.2 (26)	15.3 (10)	11.9 (11)	18.0 (9)	7.2 (3)	4.5 (1)	0.0 (Note: Results for UFPV.) (0)	19.2
1979 general election	1 Mar 1979	—N/a	65.9	27.6 (18)	19.0 (13)	16.9 (12)	15.0 (9)	8.0 (5)	4.6 (1)	3.4 (2)	8.6

=== Voting preferences ===
The table below lists raw, unweighted voting preferences.

Polling firm/Commissioner	Fieldwork date	Sample size	PNV	PSE–PSOE	UCD	HB	EE	PCE/EPK	AP	Question	X mark	Lead
1980 regional election	9 Mar 1980	—N/a	22.5	8.4	5.0	9.8	5.8	2.4	2.8	—N/a	40.2	12.7
Arvay/CIS	28 Feb 1980	1,500	25.4	9.4	3.7	8.9	9.9	2.2	1.1	22.1	13.4	15.5
1979 foral elections	3 Apr 1979	—N/a	22.7	9.4	7.3	11.0	4.4	2.7	0.0	—N/a	38.1	11.7
1979 general election	1 Mar 1979	—N/a	17.8	12.3	10.9	9.7	5.2	3.0	2.2	—N/a	34.1	5.5

=== Victory likelihood ===
The table below lists opinion polling on the perceived likelihood of victory for each party in the event of a regional election taking place.

Polling firm/Commissioner	Fieldwork date	Sample size	PNV	PSE–PSOE	UCD	HB	EE	PCE/EPK	AP	Other/ None	Question	Lead
Arvay/CIS	28 Feb 1980	1,500	73.8	3.4	3.5	1.1	0.6	0.0	0.1	0.3	17.3	70.3

=== Preferred Lehendakari ===
The table below lists opinion polling on leader preferences to become lehendakari.

Polling firm/Commissioner	Fieldwork date	Sample size				Other/ None/ Not care	Question	Lead
Polling firm/Commissioner	Fieldwork date	Sample size	Garaiko. PNV	Benegas PSE–PSOE	Viana UCD	Other/ None/ Not care	Question	Lead
Arvay/CIS	28 Feb 1980	1,500	32.6	8.0	2.2	28.8	28.4	24.6

=== Predicted Lehendakari ===
The table below lists opinion polling on the perceived likelihood for each leader to become lehendakari.

Polling firm/Commissioner	Fieldwork date	Sample size				Other/ None/ Not care	Question	Lead
Polling firm/Commissioner	Fieldwork date	Sample size	Garaiko. PNV	Benegas PSE–PSOE	Viana UCD	Other/ None/ Not care	Question	Lead
Arvay/CIS	28 Feb 1980	1,500	70.5	2.2	1.1	3.6	22.6	68.3

== Results ==
=== Overall ===
Summary of the 9 March 1980 Basque Parliament election results →
Parties and alliances	Popular vote			Seats	
Parties and alliances	Votes	%	±pp	Total	+/−
Basque Nationalist Party (EAJ/PNV)	349,102	37.95	n/a	25	n/a
Popular Unity (HB)	151,636	16.48	n/a	11	n/a
Socialist Party of the Basque Country (PSE–PSOE)	130,221	14.16	n/a	9	n/a
Basque Country Left (EE)	89,953	9.78	n/a	6	n/a
Union of the Democratic Centre (UCD)	78,095	8.49	n/a	6	n/a
People's Alliance (AP)	43,751	4.76	n/a	2	n/a
Communist Party of the Basque Country (PCE/EPK)	36,845	4.01	n/a	1	n/a
Communist Movement of the Basque Country (EMK/MCE)	10,959	1.19	n/a	0	n/a
Socialists' Unification of the Basque Country (ESEI)	6,280	0.68	n/a	0	n/a
Revolutionary Communist League (LKI/LCR)	5,182	0.56	n/a	0	n/a
Workers' Party of the Basque Country (ORT–PTE)	3,448	0.37	n/a	0	n/a
Spanish Socialist Workers' Party (historical) (PSOEh)	2,760	0.30	n/a	0	n/a
Carlist Party (EKA/PC)	2,434	0.26	n/a	0	n/a
Workers' Socialist Party (PST)	2,099	0.23	n/a	0	n/a
Communist Unity (UC)	2,044	0.22	n/a	0	n/a
Spanish Phalanx of the CNSO (FE–JONS)	1,466	0.16	n/a	0	n/a
Blank ballots	3,570	0.39	n/a		
Total	919,845			60	n/a
Valid votes	919,845	99.01	n/a		
Invalid votes	9,206	0.99	n/a		
Votes cast / turnout	929,051	59.76	n/a		
Abstentions	625,476	40.24	n/a		
Registered voters	1,554,527				

Popular vote
EAJ/PNV	37.95%
HB	16.48%
PSE–PSOE	14.16%
EE	9.78%
UCD	8.49%
AP	4.76%
PCE/EPK	4.01%
EMK/MCE	1.19%
Others	2.80%
Blank ballots	0.39%

Seats
EAJ/PNV	41.67%
HB	18.33%
PSE–PSOE	15.00%
EE	10.00%
UCD	10.00%
AP	3.33%
PCE/EPK	1.67%

=== Distribution by constituency ===
Constituency	PNV		HB		PSE		EE		UCD		AP		PCE/EPK	
Constituency	%	S	%	S	%	S	%	S	%	S	%	S	%	S
Álava	30.1	7	14.1	3	14.0	3	9.2	2	19.7	4	5.7	1	3.0	–
Biscay	40.0	9	16.4	4	14.4	3	7.8	1	6.8	1	5.8	1	4.8	1
Guipúzcoa	37.3	9	17.6	4	13.8	3	13.5	3	7.6	1	2.7	–	3.0	–
Total	38.0	25	16.5	11	14.2	9	9.8	6	8.5	6	4.8	2	4.0	1

== Aftermath ==
=== Government formation ===
Investiture; Nomination of Carlos Garaikoetxea (PNV)
Ballot →	9 April 1980 (Note: 2 PNV and 1 opposition MPs involuntarily cast invalid ballots in the first round of voting.)	9 April 1980
Required majority →	31 out of 60	Simple
Yes: • PNV (25) (23 in the first ballot)	23 / 60	25 / 60
No (Note: Parliamentary records do not specify the party membership of the 1 opposition MP that cast an invalid ballot in the first round of voting.): • PSE (9); • EE (6); • UCD (6); • AP (2); • PCE/EPK (1)	23 / 60	24 / 60
Abstentions	0 / 60	0 / 60
Absentees: • HB (11)	11 / 60	11 / 60

== Bibliography ==
- Real Decreto-ley 20/1977, de 18 de marzo, sobre Normas Electorales (Royal Decree-Law 20/1977). Official State Gazette (in Spanish). 18 March 1977. BOE-A-1977-7445.
- Ley Orgánica 3/1979, de 18 de diciembre, de Estatuto de Autonomía para el País Vasco (Organic Law 3/1979). Official State Gazette (in Spanish). 18 December 1979 [version as of 22 December 1979]. BOE-A-1979-30177.
- Decreto del Consejo General del País Vasco de 12 de enero de 1980, por el que se convocan elecciones al Parlamento Vasco (PDF) (Decree). Official Gazette of the Basque Country (in Spanish). 12 January 1980.
