= 1986 Basque regional election =

Election in the Spanish region of the Basque Country

- 30 November 1986

All 75 seats in the Basque Parliament 38 seats needed for a majority
- Opinion polls
- Registered: 1,660,143 ▲4.8%
- Turnout: 1,155,815 (69.6%) ▲1.1 pp
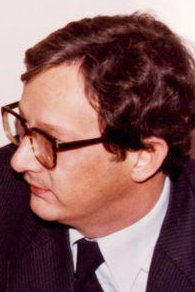

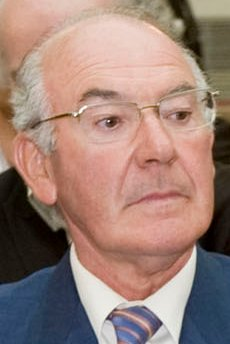

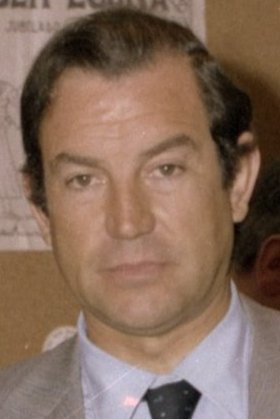

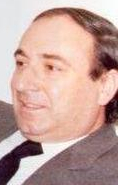

	First party	Second party	Third party
Leader	Txiki Benegas	José Antonio Ardanza	Juan Carlos Yoldi
Party	PSE–PSOE	EAJ/PNV	HB
Leader since	26 February 1978	2 March 1985	1986
Leader's seat	Biscay	Guipúzcoa	Guipúzcoa
Last election	19 seats, 23.0%	32 seats, 41.8%	11 seats, 14.6%
Seats won	19	17	13
Seat change	0	▼15	▲2
Popular vote	252,233	271,208	199,900
Percentage	22.0%	23.6%	17.4%
Swing	▼1.0 pp	▼18.2 pp	▲2.8 pp
	Fourth party	Fifth party	Sixth party
Leader	Carlos Garaikoetxea	Juan María Bandrés	Julen Guimón
Party	EA	EE	AP–PL
Leader since	4 September 1986	1985	1986
Leader's seat	Guipúzcoa	Guipúzcoa	Biscay
Last election	Did not contest	6 seats, 7.9%	7 seats, 9.3% (Note: Results for AP–PDP–UL in the 1984 election.)
Seats won	13	9	2
Seat change	▲13	▲3	▼5
Popular vote	181,175	124,423	55,606
Percentage	15.8%	10.8%	4.8%
Swing	New party	▲2.9 pp	▼4.5 pp
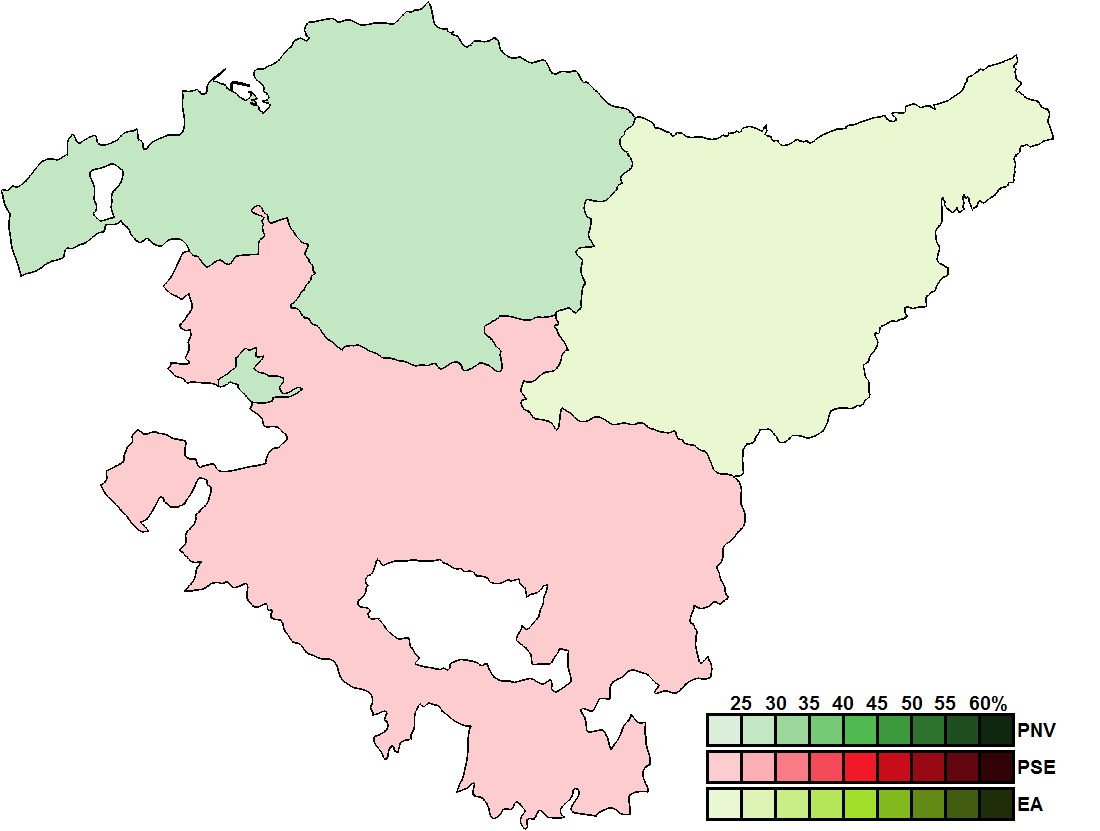
Lehendakari before election
José Antonio Ardanza
EAJ/PNV
Lehendakari after election
José Antonio Ardanza
EAJ/PNV

A regional election was held in the Basque Country on 30 November 1986 to elect the 3rd Parliament of the autonomous community. All 75 seats in the Parliament were up for election.

The Socialist Party of the Basque Country (PSE–PSOE) won 19 seats, the Basque Nationalist Party (EAJ/PNV) came second with 17 seats, People's Unity (HB) and Basque Solidarity (EA), a PNV split, each won 13 seats, and Basque Country Left won 9 seats.

== Overview ==
Under the 1979 Statute of Autonomy, the Basque Parliament was the unicameral legislature of the Basque Autonomous Community, having legislative power in devolved matters, as well as the ability to grant or withdraw confidence from a lehendakari. The electoral and procedural rules were supplemented by national law provisions.

=== Date ===
The term of the Basque Parliament expired four years after the date of its previous election, unless it was dissolved earlier. The election decree was required to be issued no later than 25 days before the scheduled expiration date of parliament and published on the following day in the Official Gazette of the Basque Country (BOPV), with election day taking place between 54 and 60 days after the decree's publication. The previous election was held on 26 February 1984, which meant that the chamber's term would have expired on 26 February 1988. The election decree was required to be published in the BOPV no later than 2 February 1988, setting the latest possible date for election day on 2 April 1988.

The lehendakari had the prerogative to dissolve the Basque Parliament at any given time and call a snap election, provided that no motion of no confidence was in process. In the event of an investiture process failing to elect a lehendakari within a 60-day period from the Parliament's reconvening, the chamber was to be automatically dissolved and a fresh election called.

The Basque Parliament was officially dissolved on 1 October 1986 with the publication of the corresponding decree in the BOPV, setting election day for 30 November.

=== Electoral system ===
Voting for the Parliament was based on universal suffrage, comprising all Spanish nationals over 18 years of age, registered in the Basque Country and with full civil and political rights, provided that they had not been deprived of the right to vote by a final sentence, nor were legally incapacitated.

The Basque Parliament had 75 seats. All were elected in three multi-member constituencies—corresponding to the provinces of Álava, Biscay and Guipúzcoa, each of which was assigned a fixed number of 25 seats to provide for an equal parliamentary representation of the three provinces—using the D'Hondt method and closed-list proportional voting, with a five percent-threshold of valid votes (not including blank ballots) (Note: Unlike other electoral legislation in Spain, valid votes under the 1983 Basque electoral law did not include blank ballots.) in each constituency.

The law did not provide for by-elections to fill vacant seats; instead, any vacancies arising after the proclamation of candidates and during the legislative term were filled by the next candidates on the party lists or, when required, by designated substitutes.

== Opinion polls ==
The tables below lists opinion polling results in reverse chronological order, showing the most recent first and using the dates when the survey fieldwork was done, as opposed to the date of publication. Where the fieldwork dates are unknown, the date of publication is given instead. The highest percentage figure in each polling survey is displayed with its background shaded in the leading party's colour. If a tie ensues, this is applied to the figures with the highest percentages. The "Lead" column on the right shows the percentage-point difference between the parties with the highest percentages in a poll.

=== Voting intention estimates ===
The table below lists weighted voting intention estimates. Refusals are generally excluded from the party vote percentages, while question wording and the treatment of "don't know" responses and those not intending to vote may vary between polling organisations. When available, seat projections determined by the polling organisations are displayed below (or in place of) the percentages in a smaller font; 38 seats were required for an absolute majority in the Basque Parliament.

Polling firm/Commissioner	Fieldwork date	Sample size	Turnout	PNV	PSE–PSOE	HB	AP	EE	CDS	EA	Lead
1986 regional election	30 Nov 1986	—N/a	69.6	23.6; 17	22.0; 19	17.4; 13	4.8; 2	10.8; 9	3.5; 2	15.8; 13	1.6
Emopública/Diario 16	23 Nov 1986	?	?	? 18/19	? 18/19	? 12/13	? 5	? 8	? 0	? 9/10	Tie
Demoscopia/El País	14–18 Nov 1986	1,500	65–68	25.0; 20/21	24.0; 19/20	? 9/10	? 2/3	? 7/8	? 1/3	? 13/14	1.0
CINDE/Basque Government	14–18 Nov 1986	1,500	?	? 20	? 18	? 12	? 3	? 10	? 2	? 10	?
Bergareche/El Correo	15–17 Nov 1986	2,972	?	? 16/18	? 18/20	? 13/15	? 5/7	? 8/9	? 2	? 9/10	?
CINDE/Basque Government	9–12 Nov 1986	1,200	?	24.0; 20	19.0; 17	14.0; 11	7.0; 4	11.0; 8	5.0; 2	15.0; 13	5.0
Demoscopia/El País	7–11 Nov 1986	1,200	65–69	28.0; 19/22	25.0; 17/18	16.0; 10/13	? 1/3	11.0; 8/9	? 1/4	13.0; 11/13	3.0
PSOE	18 Oct 1986	?	?	? 14	? 18	? 13	? 6	? 8	? 2	? 14	?
Bergareche/El Correo	18 Oct 1986	2,545	?	? 16	? 18/19	? 13/15	? 5	? 10/11	? 3	? 7/9	?
Iope–Etmar/Tiempo	7 Oct 1986	?	?	16.2; 13	18.9; 15	17.4; 13	3.6; 2	11.0; 8	3.3; 1	27.5; 23	8.6
Ikerfel/PNV	11–19 Sep 1986	?	?	? 20	? 17/18	? 11	? 7/8	? 8	? 1	? 10	?
Gaceta del Norte	12–17 Sep 1986	?	?	? 17	? 17	? 10	? 6	? 9	–	? (Note: With Carlos Garaikoetxea as EA's candidate.); 16	Tie
Gaceta del Norte	12–17 Sep 1986	?	?	? 20	? 19	? 10	? 6	? 9	–	? 11	?
1986 general election	22 Jun 1986	—N/a	67.6	27.8; 21	26.3; 23	17.7; 13	10.5 (Note: Results for CP.); 9	9.1; 7	5.0; 2	–	1.5
1984 regional election	26 Feb 1984	—N/a	68.5	41.8; 32	23.0; 19	14.6; 11	9.3; 7	7.9; 6	–	–	18.8

=== Voting preferences ===
The table below lists raw, unweighted voting preferences.

Polling firm/Commissioner	Fieldwork date	Sample size	PNV	PSE–PSOE	HB	AP	EE	CDS	EA	Question	X mark	Lead
1986 regional election (Note: Does not include non-resident citizens.)	30 Nov 1986	—N/a	16.3	15.2	12.0	3.3	7.5	2.9	10.9	—N/a	30.4	1.1
CIS	20 Nov 1986	1,191	19.0	13.0	12.0	1.0	10.0	2.0	10.0	28.0	5.0	6.0
CIS	10 Nov 1986	2,077	17.0	9.0	9.0	1.0	7.0	1.0	7.0	42.0	7.0	8.0
CIS	1 Nov 1986	2,074	17.0	8.0	9.0	1.0	8.0	1.0	8.0	40.0	7.0	8.0
CIS	20 Oct 1986	2,055	15.0	10.0	8.0	1.0	8.0	–	7.0	44.0	6.0	5.0
CIS	10 Oct 1986	1,996	17.0	9.0	8.0	1.0	7.0	1.0	8.0	41.0	7.0	8.0
CIS	1 Oct 1986	1,755	16.0	9.0	8.0	1.0	9.0	–	8.0	41.0	7.0	7.0
1986 general election	22 Jun 1986	—N/a	18.5	17.5	11.8	7.0	6.0	3.3	–	—N/a	32.4	1.0
1984 regional election	26 Feb 1984	—N/a	28.5	15.6	9.9	6.3	5.4	0.9	–	—N/a	31.5	12.9

=== Victory preferences ===
The table below lists opinion polling on the victory preferences for each party in the event of a general election taking place.

Polling firm/Commissioner	Fieldwork date	Sample size	PNV	PSE–PSOE	HB	AP	EE	CDS	EA	Other/ None	Question	Lead
CIS	20 Nov 1986	1,191	19.0	13.0	12.0	–	9.0	1.0	8.0	1.0	37.0	6.0
CIS	10 Nov 1986	2,077	22.0	11.0	9.0	1.0	8.0	1.0	9.0	–	39.0	11.0
CIS	1 Nov 1986	2,074	21.0	10.0	10.0	1.0	10.0	1.0	10.0	1.0	36.0	11.0
CIS	20 Oct 1986	2,055	20.0	13.0	9.0	1.0	9.0	–	9.0	1.0	38.0	7.0
CIS	10 Oct 1986	1,996	22.0	10.0	8.0	1.0	8.0	1.0	10.0	–	38.0	12.0
CIS	1 Oct 1986	1,755	22.0	10.0	8.0	1.0	10.0	1.0	10.0	2.0	36.0	12.0

=== Victory likelihood ===
The table below lists opinion polling on the perceived likelihood of victory for each party in the event of a regional election taking place.

Polling firm/Commissioner	Fieldwork date	Sample size	PNV	PSE–PSOE	HB	EE	EA	Other/ None	Question	Lead
CIS	20 Nov 1986	1,191	38.0	16.0	1.0	–	2.0	–	43.0	22.0
CIS	10 Nov 1986	2,077	36.0	15.0	1.0	–	3.0	–	45.0	21.0
CIS	1 Nov 1986	2,074	32.0	15.0	2.0	–	4.0	–	47.0	17.0
CIS	20 Oct 1986	2,055	32.0	17.0	2.0	–	5.0	–	44.0	15.0
CIS	10 Oct 1986	1,996	35.0	15.0	1.0	–	4.0	1.0	44.0	20.0
CIS	1 Oct 1986	1,755	31.0	19.0	–	1.0	5.0	2.0	42.0	12.0

=== Preferred Lehendakari ===
The table below lists opinion polling on leader preferences to become Lehendakari.

Polling firm/Commissioner	Fieldwork date	Sample size							Other/ None/ Not care	Question	Lead
Polling firm/Commissioner	Fieldwork date	Sample size	Ardanza PNV	Benegas PSE–PSOE	Bandrés EE	Guimón AP	Viana CDS	Garaiko. EA	Other/ None/ Not care	Question	Lead
CIS	20 Nov 1986	1,191	23.0	14.0	14.0	–	1.0	17.0	1.0	30.0	6.0
CIS	10 Nov 1986	2,077	22.0	12.0	12.0	1.0	1.0	17.0	–	35.0	5.0
CIS	1 Nov 1986	2,074	22.0	10.0	12.0	1.0	1.0	20.0	–	34.0	2.0
CIS	20 Oct 1986	2,055	19.0	12.0	14.0	1.0	–	20.0	–	34.0	1.0
CIS	10 Oct 1986	1,996	25.0	–	–	–	–	38.0	–	27.0	13.0
CIS	10 Oct 1986	1,996	19.0	9.0	13.0	1.0	–	22.0	–	36.0	3.0
CIS	1 Oct 1986	1,755	19.0	9.0	15.0	–	–	25.0	–	32.0	6.0

== Results ==
=== Overall ===
← Summary of the 30 November 1986 Basque Parliament election results →
Parties and alliances	Popular vote			Seats	
Parties and alliances	Votes	%	±pp	Total	+/−
Basque Nationalist Party (EAJ/PNV)	271,208	23.60	−18.21	17	−15
Socialist Party of the Basque Country (PSE–PSOE)	252,233	21.95	−1.01	19	±0
Popular Unity (HB)	199,900	17.40	+2.81	13	+2
Basque Solidarity (EA)	181,175	15.77	New	13	+13
Basque Country Left (EE)	124,423	10.83	+2.89	9	+3
People's Alliance–Liberal Party (AP–PL)^{1}	55,606	4.84	−4.48	2	−5
Democratic and Social Centre (CDS)	40,445	3.52	New	2	+2
United Left (IU/EB)	6,750	0.59	New	0	±0
Communist Party of the Basque Country (PCE/EPK)	5,675	0.49	−0.90	0	±0
Workers' Socialist Party (PST)	2,925	0.25	+0.05	0	±0
Humanist Party (PH)	1,400	0.12	New	0	±0
Internationalist Socialist Workers' Party (POSI)	1,190	0.10	New	0	±0
Republican Popular Unity (UPR)^{2}	1,102	0.10	±0.00	0	±0
Blank ballots (Note: The 1983 electoral law provided that blank ballots would not count as valid votes for the application of the 5 percent threshold in each district. However, this rule was not determinant in excluding any party from seat distribution during its time of application (the 1984 and 1986 elections). As a result, and for comparison purposes, blank ballots are shown here included within valid votes.)	5,003	0.44	−0.03		
Total	1,149,035			75	±0
Valid votes	1,149,035	99.41	−0.01		
Invalid votes	6,780	0.59	+0.01		
Votes cast / turnout	1,155,815	69.62	+1.13		
Abstentions	504,328	30.38	−1.13		
Registered voters	1,660,143				
Sources
Footnotes: ^{1} People's Alliance–Liberal Party results are compared to People's Coalition totals in the 1984 election.; ^{2} Republican Popular Unity results are compared to Communist Party of Spain (Marxist–Leninist) totals in the 1984 election.

Popular vote
EAJ/PNV	23.60%
PSE–PSOE	21.95%
HB	17.40%
EA	15.77%
EE	10.83%
AP–PL	4.84%
CDS	3.52%
Others	1.66%
Blank ballots	0.44%

Seats
PSE–PSOE	25.33%
EAJ/PNV	22.67%
HB	17.33%
EA	17.33%
EE	12.00%
AP–PL	2.67%
CDS	2.67%

=== Distribution by constituency ===
Constituency	PNV		PSE		HB		EA		EE		AP–PL		CDS	
Constituency	%	S	%	S	%	S	%	S	%	S	%	S	%	S
Álava	20.1	5	24.9	7	12.8	3	14.5	4	10.9	3	6.9	1	8.0	2
Biscay	28.8	8	22.5	6	16.0	4	11.7	3	10.2	3	5.1	1	3.2	–
Guipúzcoa	16.0	4	19.9	6	21.6	6	23.1	6	11.9	3	3.6	–	2.4	–
Total	23.6	17	22.0	19	17.4	13	15.8	13	10.8	9	4.8	2	3.5	2

== Aftermath ==
=== Government formation ===
Investiture
Ballot →	26 February 1987	
Required majority →	38 out of 75	
José Antonio Ardanza (PNV): • PSE (19); • PNV (17); • CDS (2)	38 / 75	check
Juan Carlos Yoldi (HB)	0 / 75	X mark
Abstentions/Blank ballots: • EA (13); • EE (9); • AP (2)	24 / 75	
Absentees: • HB (13)	13 / 75	

== Bibliography ==
- Ley Orgánica 3/1979, de 18 de diciembre, de Estatuto de Autonomía para el País Vasco (Organic Law 3/1979). Official State Gazette (in Spanish). 18 December 1979 [version as of 22 December 1979]. BOE-A-1979-30177.
- Ley 7/1981, de 30 de junio, sobre Ley de Gobierno (Law 7/1981). Official State Gazette (in Spanish). 30 June 1981 [version as of 23 November 1988]. BOE-A-2012-5927.
- Ley 28/1983, de 25 de noviembre, de Elecciones al Parlamento Vasco (Law 28/1983). Official State Gazette (in Spanish). 25 November 1983. BOE-A-2012-5194.
- Ley Orgánica 5/1985, de 19 de junio, del Régimen Electoral General (Organic Law 5/1985). Official State Gazette (in Spanish). 19 June 1985 [version as of 21 February 1986]. BOE-A-1985-11672.
- Decreto 202/1986, de 30 de Septiembre, de Disolución del Parlamento Vasco y Convocatoria de Elecciones (PDF) (Decree 202/1986). Official Gazette of the Basque Country (in Spanish). 30 September 1986.
