= Joseba Agirreazkuenaga =

Spanish researcher

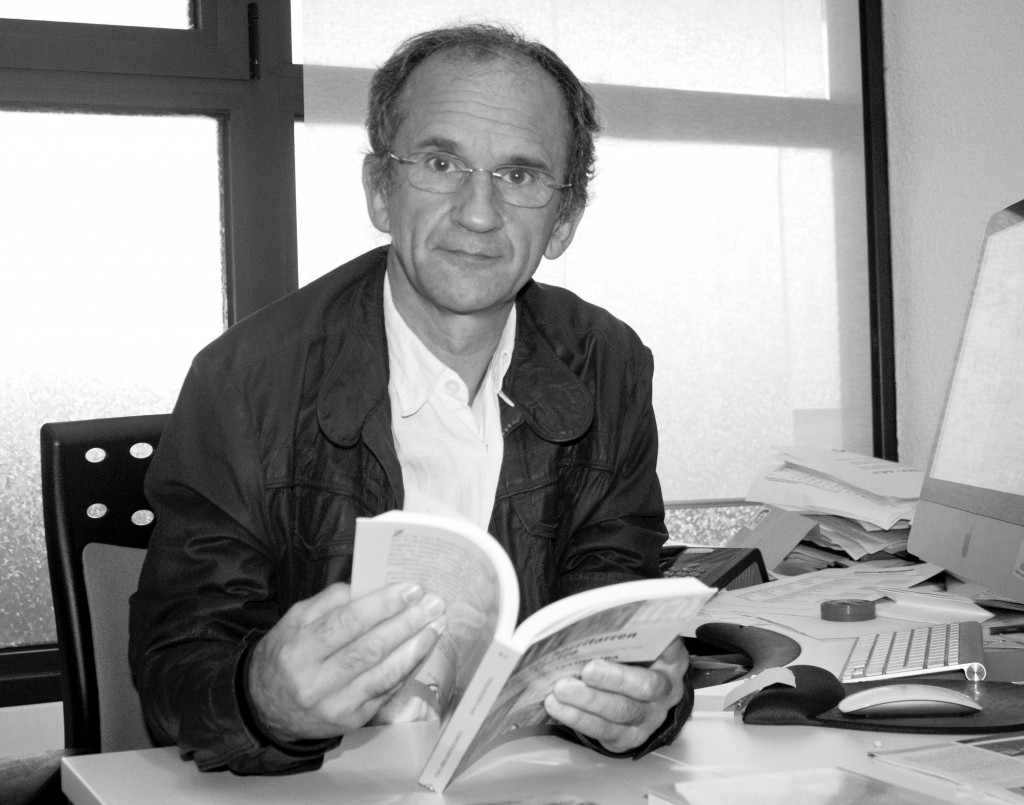
- Joseba Agirreazkuenaga in 2012
- Born: February 2, 1953 (age 73); Bilbo, Basque Country
- Education: University of Deusto; University of Nevada
- Scientific career
- Fields: History Basque Country Parliaments
- Thesis: (1985)

Joseba Agirreazkuenaga (Bilbao, Biscay, Spain, 2 February 1953) is a researcher and historian. He is specialist in the history of the Basque Country particularly: the crisis of the Ancien Régime; the fueros, self-governance, the economic concert between Spain and the Autonomous Community of the Basque Country and its fiscal system, and the social movements both in Bilbao and in the Basque Country as a whole.

== Biography ==
Agirreazkuenaga was born in Bilbao, but spent his childhood in Busturia, a small village in the province of Biscay. He graduated in Philosophy and Arts in 1976 from the University of Deusto, with a specialty in the field of Geography and History. His first research project, on ethnography in Busturia, was carried out in 1972 under the supervision of Jose Migel Barandiaran. He was a predoctoral fellow in the program of the Joint Hispano-American Committee (at the University of Nevada and the University of Deusto), and received his PhD in 1985 with a thesis directed by Julio Caro Baroja. He has been a professor at the University of the Basque Country since 1995, where he has been a member of the Research Commission (2006-2017) and of the Commissions for the Development of Basque language (1994-2006).

He was a visiting professor at the University of Oxford (1989-1990, 2006-2007), the European University Institute in Florence (1993), and University of Nevada, Reno Center for Basque Studies (2013-2014), as well as director of the Ituna Center for Basque Economic Agreement and Fiscal Federalism Studies Documentation since 2007.

His usual fields of research have been biography and prosopography, the crisis of the Ancien Régime, liberal revolutions, cultural sociability, political-administrative organisation and management, parliaments, daily history and oral history. He has published 25 books (13 with members of his team and 12 as sole author), 92 book chapters and 83 articles in indexed research journals. He has 96 references published in Inguma (database of the Basque scientific community).

He is the principal researcher of the Prosoparlam research group of the University of the Basque Country, also known as Biography & Parliament. The group was formed in 1989 and it is a member of the International Commission for the History of Representative and Parliamentary Institutions, founded in 1936, affiliated organization of the International Committee of Historical Sciences (ICHS). The group also participates, since 2010, in the European Information and Research Network on Parliamentary History.

Editor the journal Bidebarrieta, Anuario de ciencias sociales y humanidades de Bilbao, (Bilbao Yearbook of Social Sciences and Humanities), he is also a member of the editorial board of several scientific publications: Vasconia, Cuadernos de historia-geografía de la Sociedad de Estudios Vascos.

He has directed more than twenty PhD theses and has given talks and courses at the University of Oxford, the University of Xalapa, the University of Brasilia, the Sapienza University of Rome, the Autonomous University of Barcelona, the University of Navarra and the University of Nevada.

== Director of the Society for Basque Studies ==
Between 1985 and 1992 he was president of the Department of History and Geography of the Basque Studies Society (Eusko Ikaskuntza). He was also vice-president of this organisation in Biscay between 1991 and 1997. After Jose Migel Barandiaran's death, he took part in the collegiate presidency of this Society and directed its XII Congress.

He was also the founder and first director of the publication Asmoz ta Jakitez and organiser of the 21st symposia on the history of Bilbao.

== Veteran member of the Basque Summer University ==
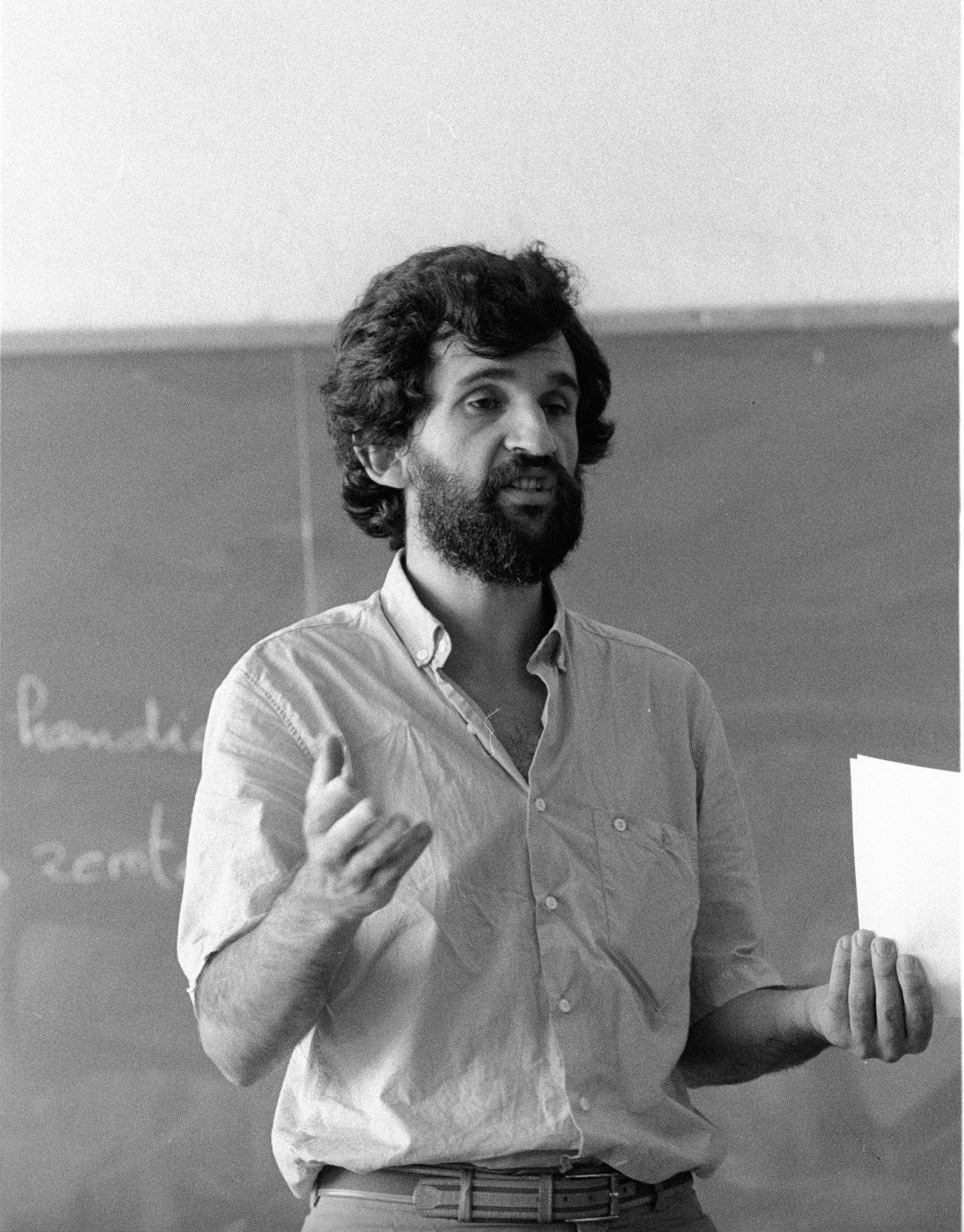
Agirreazkuenaga as UEU speaker in 1983

He is a historical member of the Basque Summer University (Udako Euskal Unibertsitatea, UEU), an organization that is promoting the creation of a university in Basque since 1973. Agirreazkuenaga has participated actively since almost its foundation; in 1974, he was a speaker in the section of History, and in 1974-1975 member of the Direction Committee with Manex Goienetxe and Andolin Eguzkitza. Over the years, he has been a speaker 42 times in the Summer Courses of the UEU.

== Bibliographic production ==
These are some of his publications:

- Euskal Herriaren historiaz I. // On the history of the Basque Country (1985) Rafael Lopez Atxurra.
- Vizcaya in the 19th century: the public finances of an emerging State (1987)
- Gerra eta bakea Euskal Herrian. Politikagintza lege zaharraren krisialdian // War and peace in the Basque Country. Politics in the crisis of the Ancient Regime (1993)
- Iraultza industriala abiatu ezinik // Unable to start the industrial revolution (1789-1876) (1993)
- Euskal gizartean barrena euskaltzaletasun politikoaren sorrera garaian: zaldunak, matxinoak, enpresariak, langileen eraketa (1789-1876) (1995)
- Manu Ziarsolo, Abeletxe (1902-1987) 199814
- Biographical Dictionary of General Deputies of Álava (2003; egilekidea)
- History of Euskal Herria (2005, Lur, sei liburuki; koordinatzailea)
- Biographical Dictionary of Parliamentarians of Vasconia. 1876-1939 (2007, hiru liburuki; zuzendarikidea)
- Biographical dictionary of the mayors of Bilbao and municipal management during the Franco dictatorship (1937-1979) (2008, zuzendarikidea)
- Biographical Dictionary of Spanish Parliamentarians. Courts of Cadiz. (1810-1814) (2010, hiru liburuki; zuzendarikidea)
- Barne-muinetako Sabin Arana Goiri. Gutunak I // Sabino Arana Goiri: Letters I (1876-1903) (2010; arduraduna)
- The Making of the Basque Question: Experiencing Self-Government, 1793-1877 (Reno, Center for Basque Studies, 2011)
- Euskal herritarron burujabetza. 1793-1919 Autogobernu auziaren bilakaeraz // The independence of the Basques. Evolution of the conflict of self-government in 1793-1919 (2012)

According to the database of the Basque scientific community Inguma, has made 96 contributions in Basque (29 papers and 45 articles)

== Awards and recognition ==
- 2015: President of the International Commission for the History of Representative and Parliamentary Institutions
- 2014: William A. Douglass Distinguished Visiting Scholar for 2013–2014. Center for Basque Studies. University of Nevada, Reno.
- 2011: Miguel de Unamuno Award from Bilbao City Council, for the essay "Euskal Herritarren burujabetza politikoaren auzia mundu berriaren zurrunbiloan".
- 2010: Member of the Historical Research Network of the European Parliament
- 2007: Research Prize of the Euskoiker Foundation for Research in the Basque Country in the speciality of Humanities.
- 1986: History of the Encartaciones Prize, Galdames City Council.
- 1981: Resurrección Maria Azkue Prize for research in Basque language awarded by the Caja de Ahorros de Bilbao.
