= Castilian Popular Unity =

Castilian Popular Unity Unidad Popular Castellana
- Leader: Doris Benegas
- Founded: 1983
- Dissolved: 2002
- Merged into: Castilian Left
- Youth wing: Castilian Revolutionary Youth
- Ideology: Revolutionary socialism Left-wing Nationalism; Feminism; Castilian nationalism Communism
- Women organization: Mujeres Castellanas
- Colours: Purple

UPC flag.

Castilian Popular Unity (Spanish: Unidad Popular Castellana, UPC) was a leftist nationalist political party active in the Spanish autonomous community of Castile and Leon. It defended the national recognition of Castile and its independence.

== History ==
UPC was founded in Valladolid in 1983 as Popular Unity-Revolutionary Unity, changing the name some months later. The majority of its members were young leftists and ex-members of the Communist Movement. UPC only had a stable presence in Castilla y León, specially in the provinces of Burgos, Valladolid and Segovia.

UPC had close ties to the Basque coalition Herri Batasuna.

In 2002 the party merged with Izquierda Comunera, Mujeres Castellanas and the Castilian Circle of Toledo to create Castilian Left.
