= José María Benegas =

Spanish politician (1948–2015)

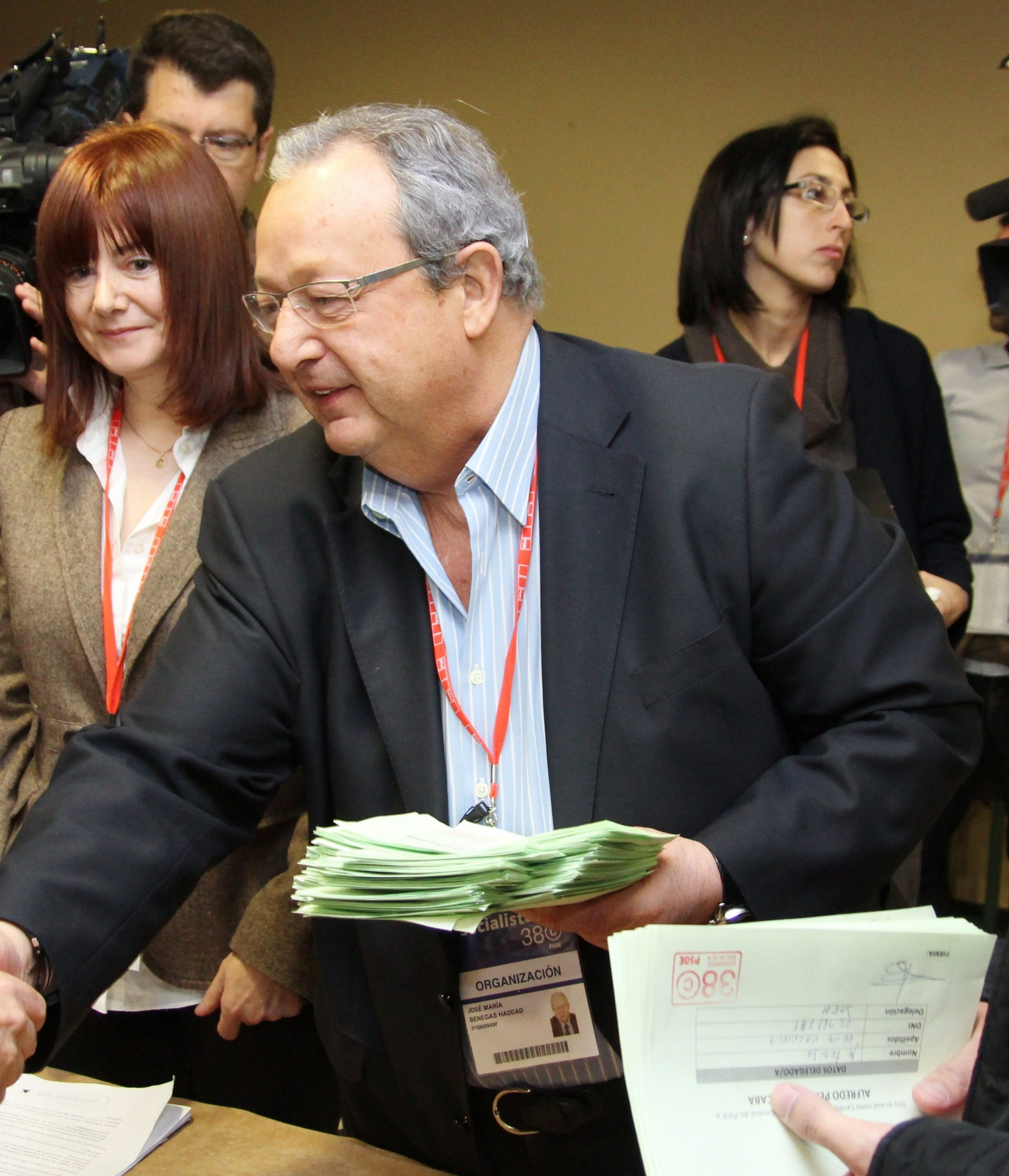
- José María "Txiki" Benegas in the 38th PSOE Congress (2012).
- Born: 25 July 1948; Caracas, Venezuela
- Died: 25 August 2015 (aged 67); Madrid, Spain

José María "Txiki" Benegas Haddad (25 July 1948 – 25 August 2015) was a Spanish politician for the Spanish Socialist Workers' Party (PSOE). His nickname "Txiki" is Basque for "small".

== Early life ==
Benegas was born in Caracas, Venezuela. His father, José María Benegas Echeverría, was an exiled Basque Nationalist politician, who fled Spain in 1939 following the victory of Francisco Franco in the Spanish Civil War. While his mother, Doris Haddad, was a Lebanese Jew who immigrated from Lebanon to Venezuela. Benegas moved to Spain in 1955 and studied in the Jesuit College before qualifying as a lawyer at the University of Valladolid in 1971. He then briefly moved to London to study English and Economics.

== Entering politics ==
On his return, he joined the PSOE and the affiliated Trade Union, the Unión General de Trabajadores. In 1974 he was elected Secretary of the PSOE's youth wing and also became Vice-Secretary of the International Socialist Youth movement. In 1977 he entered national politics when he was elected to the Spanish national parliament as a deputy for Biscay Province and was re-elected at the 1979 election.

== Basque regional politics ==
However, in February 1980, he resigned from Congress in order to head the PSOE list for Guipuzcoa in the elections to the Basque parliament and was elected to that legislature. He returned to the Spanish Congress at the 1982 General Election representing Álava Province. However he resigned in February 1984 after being chosen to head the PSOE list in the Basque parliamentary elections. Despite the PSOE increasing their vote and more than doubling their number of seats from 9 to 19, he was unsuccessful in his bid to become Lehendakari or President of the autonomous government of the Basque Country. That office was retained by the Basque Nationalist Party (PNV), which formed the government after those elections. However, after one year the PNV entered into an agreement with the PSOE for legislative support and in 1986 a split in the PNV led to the formation of Eusko Alkartasuna. As a result, the PNV lacked sufficient support to govern and was forced to call early elections in 1986 at which Benegas was again the candidate for Basque President. Although the PSOE managed to overtake the PNV as the largest party in the new legislature, the PNV candidate José Antonio Ardanza was re-elected President of the Basque autonomous community.

From 1984 to 1994 Benegas was third in the PSOE party hierarchy after Gonzalez and Guerra.

In 1989 Benegas returned to national politics when he was elected to the Congress, representing Biscay. He was re-elected at every subsequent General Election until 2011 and was one of the few members of the Constituent Cortes (1977-1979) in the 2011 legislature.

== Personal life ==
Benegas was married to Maite Urabayen and was the father of two children. His son is the Spanish musician and songwriter Pablo Benegas, guitarist in the group La Oreja de Van Gogh. His sister, Doris Benegas, was the President of the Castilian Left party. On 25 August 2015, Benegas died in Madrid of cancer, which he had suffered from for several months.
