= Euskobarómetro =

Sociological statistical survey in the Basque Country

The Euskobarómetro ("Basque-barometer") is a sociological statistical survey in the Basque Country (País Vasco), an autonomous community of Spain. It is conducted by the Department of Political Science of the University of the Basque Country.

== Technique ==
The poll does not cover Navarre or the Basque areas of France; where Basque nationalism is generally believed to be weaker than in the three provinces of the Basque Country autonomous community. It is based on personal interviews at home.

== On Basque separatism ==
Because the Spanish government has passed laws outlawing formal referendums about the possibility of Basque independence, the Euskobarómetro is one of the better gauges available of the extent of Basque political sentiment. According to the survey, as of May 2004 a significant number of Basques support independence of their region from Spain, but rather few support the violence of groups such as ETA:

- 33% favor Basque independence, 31% federalism, 32% autonomy, 2% centralism. (2% undecided or not answering)
- Asked whether they agree or disagree with the statement, "Today in Euskadi it is possible to defend all political aspirations and objectives without the necessity of resorting to violence", 87% agree and only 4% disagree (9% undecided or not answering). In fact, 33% of those who identify politically with ETA-affiliated Batasuna agreed with the statement.
- Asked directly about their views of ETA, 60% rejected ETA totally and another 18% identified themselves as former ETA sympathizers who no longer support the group. Another 13% agreed with ETA's ends, but not their means. 3% said that their attitude towards ETA was mainly one of fear, 2% indifference. Only 2%, all identified with Batasuna, gave ETA support even as mild as "justified, with criticism". 2% were undecided or did not answer. Even within Batasuna, 63% rejected ETA's violence.

== See also ==
- Basque Country independence
