= 1984 Basque regional election =

Election in the Spanish region of the Basque Country

- 26 February 1984

All 75 seats in the Basque Parliament 38 seats needed for a majority
- Opinion polls
- Registered: 1,584,540 ▲1.9%
- Turnout: 1,085,304 (68.5%) ▲8.7 pp
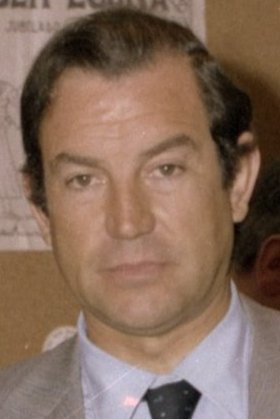

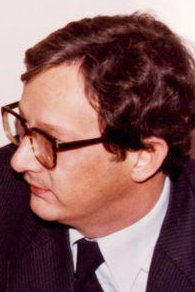

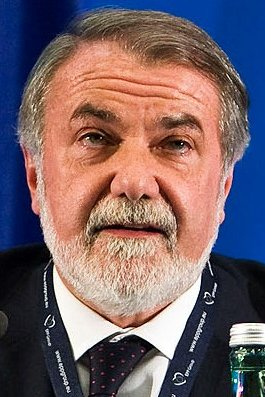

	First party	Second party	Third party
Leader	Carlos Garaikoetxea	Txiki Benegas	—
Party	EAJ/PNV	PSE–PSOE	HB
Leader since	April 1977	26 February 1978	—
Leader's seat	Guipúzcoa	Biscay	—
Last election	25 seats, 38.0%	9 seats, 14.2%	11 seats, 16.5%
Seats won	32	19	11
Seat change	▲7	▲10	0
Popular vote	451,178	247,786	157,389
Percentage	41.8%	23.0%	14.6%
Swing	▲3.8 pp	▲8.8 pp	▼1.9 pp
	Fourth party	Fifth party
Leader	Jaime Mayor Oreja	Mario Onaindia
Party	AP–PDP–UL	EE
Leader since	1984	1982
Leader's seat	Guipúzcoa	Álava
Last election	2 seats, 4.8% (Note: Results for AP in the 1980 election.)	6 seats, 9.8%
Seats won	7	6
Seat change	▲5	0
Popular vote	100,581	85,671
Percentage	9.3%	7.9%
Swing	▲4.5 pp	▼1.9 pp
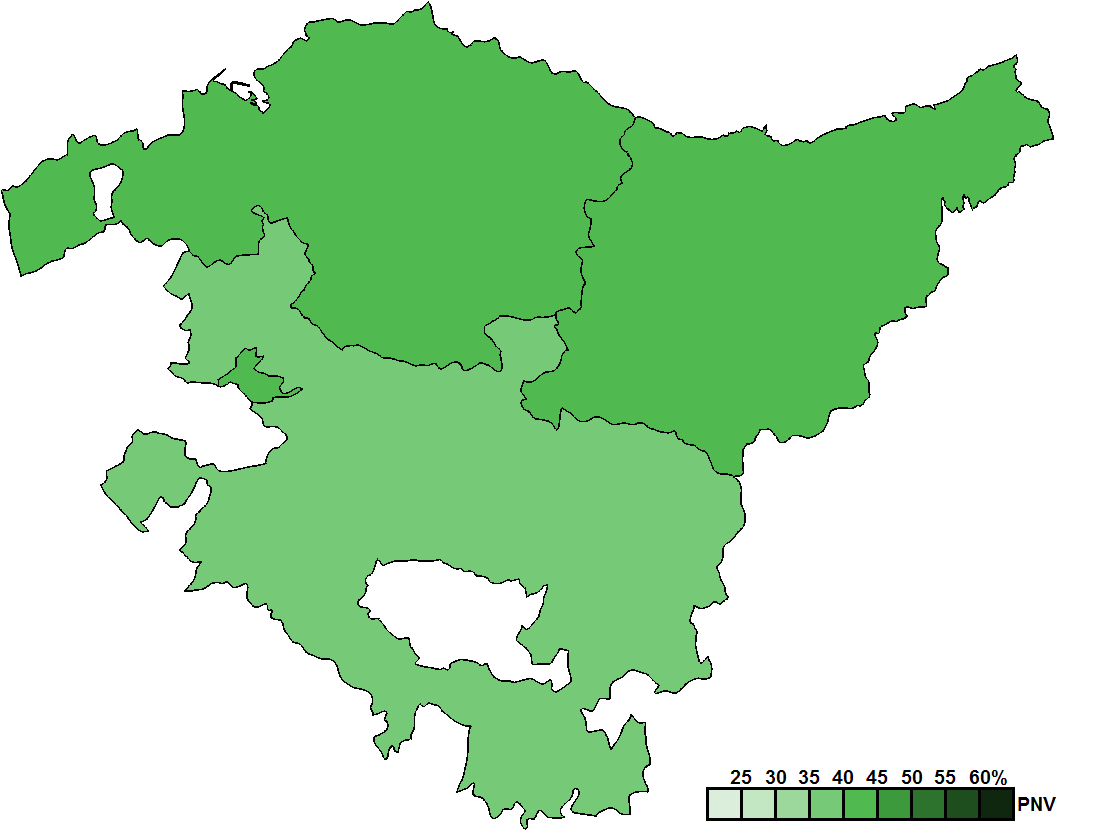
- Vote winner strength by constituency
Lehendakari before election
Carlos Garaikoetxea
EAJ/PNV
Lehendakari after election
Carlos Garaikoetxea
EAJ/PNV

A regional election was held in the Basque Country on 26 February 1984 to elect the 2nd Parliament of the autonomous community. All 75 seats in the Parliament were up for election.

The Basque Nationalist Party (EAJ/PNV) won 32 seats, the Socialist Party of the Basque Country (PSE–PSOE) came second with 19 seats, People's Unity (HB) came third with 11 seats, the People's Coalition (AP–PDP–UL) won 7 seats, and Basque Country Left (EE) won 6 seats.

== Overview ==
Under the 1979 Statute of Autonomy, the Basque Parliament was the unicameral legislature of the Basque Autonomous Community, having legislative power in devolved matters, as well as the ability to grant or withdraw confidence from a lehendakari. The electoral and procedural rules were supplemented by national law provisions.

=== Date ===
The term of the Basque Parliament expired four years after the date of its previous election, unless it was dissolved earlier. The election decree was required to be published in the Official Gazette of the Basque Country (BOPV) between 36 and 45 days before the scheduled election day. The previous election was held on 9 March 1980, which meant that the chamber's term would have expired on 9 March 1984, setting the latest possible date for election day on 23 April 1984.

Amendments in 1981 granted the lehendakari the prerogative to dissolve the Basque Parliament at any given time and call a snap election, provided that no motion of no confidence was in process. In the event of an investiture process failing to elect a lehendakari within a 60-day period from the Parliament's reconvening, the chamber was to be automatically dissolved and a fresh election called.

The Basque Parliament was officially dissolved on 18 January 1984 with the publication of the corresponding decree in the BOPV, setting election day for 26 February.

=== Electoral system ===
Voting for the Parliament was based on universal suffrage, comprising all Spanish nationals over 18 years of age, registered in the Basque Country and with full civil and political rights.

The Basque Parliament had 75 seats. All were elected in three multi-member constituencies—corresponding to the provinces of Álava, Biscay and Guipúzcoa, each of which was assigned a fixed number of 25 seats to provide for an equal parliamentary representation of the three provinces—using the D'Hondt method and closed-list proportional voting, with a five percent-threshold of valid votes (not including blank ballots) (Note: Unlike other electoral legislation in Spain, valid votes under the 1983 Basque electoral law did not include blank ballots.) in each constituency.

The law did not provide for by-elections to fill vacant seats; instead, any vacancies arising after the proclamation of candidates and during the legislative term were filled by the next candidates on the party lists or, when required, by designated substitutes.

== Opinion polls ==
The tables below list opinion polling results in reverse chronological order, showing the most recent first and using the dates when the survey fieldwork was done, as opposed to the date of publication. Where the fieldwork dates are unknown, the date of publication is given instead. The highest percentage figure in each polling survey is displayed with its background shaded in the leading party's colour. If a tie ensues, this is applied to the figures with the highest percentages. The "Lead" column on the right shows the percentage-point difference between the parties with the highest percentages in a poll.

=== Voting intention estimates ===
The table below lists weighted voting intention estimates. Refusals are generally excluded from the party vote percentages, while question wording and the treatment of "don't know" responses and those not intending to vote may vary between polling organisations. When available, seat projections determined by the polling organisations are displayed below (or in place of) the percentages in a smaller font; 38 seats were required for an absolute majority in the Basque Parliament (31 in the 1980 election).

Polling firm/Commissioner	Fieldwork date	Sample size	Turnout	PNV	HB	PSE–PSOE	EE	UCD	AP–PDP–UL	PCE/EPK	CDS	Lead
1984 regional election	26 Feb 1984	—N/a	68.5	41.8; 32	14.6; 11	23.0; 19	7.9; 6	–	9.3; 7	1.4; 0	–	18.8
ECO/CIS (Note: Undecided and/or abstentionists excluded.)	20 Feb 1984	1,506	?	46.0	16.0	18.0	13.0	–	4.0	1.0	–	28.0
Emopública/El País	13–16 Feb 1984	1,200	?	46.0; 39/44	13.6; 8/12	16.6; 12/16	10.3; 7/10	–	1.8; 1/2	–	–	29.4
AP	30 Jan 1984	?	?	41.5	16.7	17.6	9.4	–	8.3	–	–	23.9
PSE–PSOE	21 Jan 1984	?	?	? 33	? 9	? 19	? 8	–	? 6	–	–	?
Basque Government	21 Jan 1984	?	?	? 36	? 8	? 17	? 9	–	? 4	–	–	?
Gabinete Azterka/EE	3–10 Nov 1983	600	65	35.0; 28	13.0; 10	23.0; 18	10.0; 7	–	12.0; 10	–	–	12.0
1983 foral elections	8 May 1983	—N/a	64.6	39.6 (26)	14.2 (8)	26.3 (17)	7.9 (4)	–	8.8 (5)	2.0 (0)	0.3 (0)	13.3
1982 general election	28 Oct 1982	—N/a	79.3	31.7 (19)	14.7 (9)	29.2 (21)	7.7 (4)	(Note: Within AP–PDP–PDL–UCD.)	11.6 (Note: Results for AP–PDP–PDL–UCD.) (7)	1.8 (0)	1.8 (0)	2.5
ICSA–Gallup/Tribuna Vasca	25 Aug 1982	?	?	36.5; 24	13.3; 8	20.3; 13	13.7; 9	5.2; 4	2.4; 1	2.8; 1	–	16.2
1980 regional election	9 Mar 1980	—N/a	59.8	38.0; 25	16.5; 11	14.2; 9	9.8; 6	8.5; 6	4.8 (Note: Results for AP.); 2	4.0; 1	–	21.5

=== Voting preferences ===
The table below lists raw, unweighted voting preferences.

Polling firm/Commissioner	Fieldwork date	Sample size	PNV	HB	PSE–PSOE	EE	UCD	AP–PDP–UL	PCE/EPK	CDS	Question	X mark	Lead
1984 regional election	26 Feb 1984	—N/a	28.5	9.9	15.6	5.4	–	6.3	0.9	–	—N/a	31.5	12.9
ECO/CIS	20 Feb 1984	1,506	33.0	13.0	12.0	8.0	–	3.0	1.0	–	17.0	12.0	20.0
Emopública/El País	13–16 Feb 1984	1,200	32.3	9.5	11.6	7.2	–	1.3	–	–	21.3	8.6	20.7
CIS	10 Feb 1984	2,900	24.4	9.3	13.5	6.2	–	3.1	1.4	–	31.5	10.1	10.9
AP	30 Jan 1984	?	32.4	13.0	13.7	7.3	–	6.5	–	–	22.0		18.7
Alef/CIS (Note: "Situación social y política del País Vasco (III) (Estudio nº 1388. Febrero 1984)" (PDF). CIS (in Spanish). 30 January 1984. Archived from the original on 18 September 2019.)	22–30 Jan 1984	1,999	37.0	8.0	11.0	8.0	–	1.0	1.0	–	26.0	9.0	26.0
ECO/CIS	25–27 Jan 1984	1,515	32.0	9.0	11.0	8.0	–	1.0	1.0	–	23.0	14.0	21.0
CIS	1 Nov 1983	1,500	28.0	9.0	13.0	6.0	–	4.0	1.0	–	26.0	13.0	15.0
Aryo/CIS	1 Sep 1983	3,000	28.0	8.0	17.0	6.0	–	3.0	2.0	–	26.0	10.0	11.0
1983 foral elections	8 May 1983	—N/a	25.2	9.1	16.8	5.0	–	5.6	1.3	0.2	—N/a	35.4	8.4
1983 local elections	8 May 1983	—N/a	25.0	8.7	16.4	4.7	–	5.0	1.3	0.3	—N/a	35.3	8.6
1982 general election	28 Oct 1982	—N/a	24.7	11.4	22.7	6.0		9.0	1.4	1.4	—N/a	20.7	2.0
1980 regional election	9 Mar 1980	—N/a	22.5	9.8	8.4	5.8	5.0	2.8	2.4	–	—N/a	40.2	12.7

=== Victory likelihood ===
The table below lists opinion polling on the perceived likelihood of victory for each party in the event of a regional election taking place.

Polling firm/Commissioner	Fieldwork date	Sample size	PNV	HB	PSE–PSOE	EE	AP–PDP–UL	PCE/EPK	Other/ None	Question	Lead
CIS	10 Feb 1984	2,900	56.8	2.5	12.1	0.9	1.2	0.3	0.0	26.2	44.7
Alef/CIS	22–30 Jan 1984	1,999	82.0	–	6.0	–	–	–	1.0	10.0	76.0
ECO/CIS	1 Nov 1983	1,500	60.0	–	14.0	–	–	–	5.0	21.0	46.0
Aryo/CIS	1 Sep 1983	3,000	74.0	–	13.0	–	–	–	2.0	12.0	61.0

=== Preferred Lehendakari ===
The table below lists opinion polling on leader preferences to become Lehendakari.

Polling firm/Commissioner	Fieldwork date	Sample size						Other/ None/ Not care	Question	Lead
Polling firm/Commissioner	Fieldwork date	Sample size	Garaiko. PNV	Brouard HB	Benegas PSE–PSOE	Onaindia EE	M. Oreja CP	Other/ None/ Not care	Question	Lead
ECO/CIS	20 Feb 1984	1,506	41.0	9.0	13.0	9.0	2.0	17.0	9.0	28.0
CIS	10 Feb 1984	2,900	39.5	–	20.7	–	–	–	39.9	18.8
Alef/CIS	22–30 Jan 1984	1,999	65.0	–	16.0	–	–	–	18.0	49.0
ECO/CIS	25–27 Jan 1984	1,515	55.0	–	14.0	–	–	18.0	13.0	41.0
CIS	1 Nov 1983	1,500	41.0	–	19.0	–	–	–	40.0	22.0
Aryo/CIS	1 Sep 1983	3,000	48.0	–	19.0	–	–	–	35.0	29.0

== Results ==
=== Overall ===
← Summary of the 26 February 1984 Basque Parliament election results →
Parties and alliances	Popular vote			Seats	
Parties and alliances	Votes	%	±pp	Total	+/−
Basque Nationalist Party (EAJ/PNV)	451,178	41.81	+3.86	32	+7
Socialist Party of the Basque Country (PSE–PSOE)	247,786	22.96	+8.80	19	+10
Popular Unity (HB)	157,389	14.59	−1.89	11	±0
People's Coalition (AP–PDP–UL)^{1}	100,581	9.32	+4.56	7	+5
Basque Country Left (EE)	85,671	7.94	−1.84	6	±0
Communist Party of the Basque Country (PCE/EPK)	14,985	1.39	−2.62	0	−1
Neighborhood Labor (Auzolan)^{2}	10,714	0.99	−0.76	0	±0
Left Socialist Candidacy (CSI)	2,507	0.23	New	0	±0
Workers' Socialist Party (PST)	2,173	0.20	−0.03	0	±0
Communist Party of Spain (Marxist–Leninist) (PCE (m–l))	1,044	0.10	New	0	±0
Union of the Democratic Centre (UCD)	n/a	n/a	−8.49	0	−6
Blank ballots (Note: The 1983 electoral law provided that blank ballots would not count as valid votes for the application of the 5 percent threshold in each district. However, this rule was not determinant in excluding any party from seat distribution during its time of application (the 1984 and 1986 elections). As a result, and for comparison purposes, blank ballots are shown here included within valid votes.)	5,029	0.47	+0.08		
Total	1,079,057			75	+15
Valid votes	1,079,057	99.42	+0.41		
Invalid votes	6,247	0.58	−0.41		
Votes cast / turnout	1,085,304	68.49	+8.73		
Abstentions	499,236	31.51	−8.73		
Registered voters	1,584,540				
Sources
Footnotes: ^{1} People's Coalition results are compared to People's Alliance totals in the 1980 election.; ^{2} Auzolan results are compared to the combined totals of Communist Movement of the Basque Country and Revolutionary Communist League in the 1980 election.

Popular vote
EAJ/PNV	41.81%
PSE–PSOE	22.96%
HB	14.59%
AP–PDP–UL	9.32%
EE	7.94%
PCE/EPK	1.39%
Others	1.52%
Blank ballots	0.47%

Seats
EAJ/PNV	42.67%
PSE–PSOE	25.33%
HB	14.67%
AP–PDP–UL	9.33%
EE	8.00%

=== Distribution by constituency ===
Constituency	PNV		PSE		HB		CP		EE	
Constituency	%	S	%	S	%	S	%	S	%	S
Álava	35.5	9	25.1	7	10.8	3	16.2	4	7.7	2
Biscay	43.8	12	23.1	6	12.9	3	9.4	2	7.4	2
Guipúzcoa	40.8	11	22.1	6	18.7	5	6.8	1	8.9	2
Total	41.8	32	23.0	19	14.6	11	9.3	7	7.9	6

== Aftermath ==
=== Government formation ===
Investiture
Ballot →	11 April 1984		12 April 1984	
Required majority →	38 out of 75		Simple	
Carlos Garaikoetxea (PNV): • PNV (32)	32 / 75	X mark	32 / 75	check
Abstentions/Blank ballots: • PSE (19); • AP–PDP–UL (7); • EE (6)	32 / 75		32 / 75	
Absentees: • HB (11)	11 / 75		11 / 75	

=== 1985 investiture ===
Investiture
Ballot →	23 January 1985		24 January 1985	
Required majority →	38 out of 75		Simple	
José Antonio Ardanza (PNV) (Note: Parliamentary records do not specify the party membership of the 34 MPs that voted for Ardanza, but it is hypothesized that between 2 and 4 PSE MPs voted for him, and that up to 2 PNV MPs abstained.): • PNV (30/32); • PSE (2/4)	34 / 75	X mark	34 / 75	check
Abstentions/Blank ballots: • PSE (15/17); • AP–PDP–UL (7); • EE (6)	30 / 75		30 / 75	
Absentees: • HB (11)	11 / 75		11 / 75	

== Bibliography ==
- Real Decreto-ley 20/1977, de 18 de marzo, sobre Normas Electorales (Royal Decree-Law 20/1977). Official State Gazette (in Spanish). 18 March 1977. BOE-A-1977-7445.
- Ley Orgánica 3/1979, de 18 de diciembre, de Estatuto de Autonomía para el País Vasco (Organic Law 3/1979). Official State Gazette (in Spanish). 18 December 1979 [version as of 22 December 1979]. BOE-A-1979-30177.
- Ley 7/1981, de 30 de junio, sobre Ley de Gobierno (Law 7/1981). Official State Gazette (in Spanish). 30 June 1981 [version as of 23 November 1988]. BOE-A-2012-5927.
- Ley 28/1983, de 25 de noviembre, de Elecciones al Parlamento Vasco (Law 28/1983). Official State Gazette (in Spanish). 25 November 1983. BOE-A-2012-5194.
- Decreto 13/1984, de 17 de Enero, de disolución del Parlamento Vasco y convocatoria de elecciones (PDF) (Decree 13/1984). Official Gazette of the Basque Country (in Spanish). 17 January 1984.
