= Eusko Sozialistak =

Eusko Sozialistak Basque Socialists
- Leader: Javier Alonso; Mikel Salaberri
- Founded: 1975
- Dissolved: 1977
- Merged into: Herri Alderdi Sozialista Iraultzailea
- Newspaper: Eusko Sozialistak
- Union affiliation: Unión Sindical Obrera
- Ideology: Basque independence Workers' self-management Christian socialism Antifascism
- Political position: Left
- National affiliation: Koordinadora Abertzale Sozialista

Party flag

Eusko Sozialistak (English: Basque Socialists; ES) was a Basque socialist political party, with presence in the Spanish Basque Country. The leaders of ES were Javier Alonso and Mikel Salaberri .

== History ==
ES was formed by members of the Christian socialist union Unión Sindical Obrera (USO) in October 1975. ES did not hold its first meeting until 13 November 1976. The organization was part of the Federation of Socialist Parties.

In July 1977 ES joined Herri Alderdi Sozialista Iraultzailea (HASI), which in turn would join Herri Batasuna in 1978.

ES was always critical of both ETA (m) and ETA (pm).
