= Herriko Alderdi Sozialista =

Herriko Alderdi Sozialista Basque Socialist Party
- Founded: 1974
- Dissolved: 1975
- Merged into: Euskal Herriko Alderdi Sozialista
- Newspaper: Euskaldunak
- Ideology: Basque independence Revolutionary socialism Marxism-Leninism; Abertzale Left
- Political position: Far-left

Party flag

Herriko Alderdi Sozialista (English: People's Socialist Party; HAS) was a revolutionary socialist Basque political party, with presence only in the French Basque Country.

== History ==
HAS was founded in 1974 in Bayonne by ex-members of Enbata, a Basque nationalist organization banned in January of the same year by the French president Georges Pompidou. One of the main goals of HAS was to give support to the Basque national liberation struggle in the Southern Basque Country and to organize mobilizations of support of the Basque prisoners and ETA(m) militants that were being judged by Francoist Spain in the Process of Burgos.
