= Julen Guimón =

Spanish politician and jurist (1931 –2001)

- Born: Julen Guimón Ugartechea; 3 October 1931; Bilbao
- Died: 10 December 2001 (aged 70); Bilbao
- Education: University of Deusto
- Occupations: Academic; Jurist
- Known for: Signatory of the Ajuria Enea Pact

Julen Guimón (3 October 1931 – 10 December 2001) was a Basque-origin conservative Spanish jurist and politician who played a significant role in the politics of the Basque region until his retirement in 1990. He was among the signatories of the Ajuria Enea Pact which led to the pacification of the Basque Country.

== Early life and education ==
Guimón was born in Bilbao on 3 October 1931. He obtained a degree in law from the University of Deusto where he also received his PhD. He attended post-doctoral courses at Yale University.

== Career ==
Following his graduation Guimón worked as a lawyer and then became professor of political law at the University of Deusto. He entered politics during the transition period and served as general secretary of the Basque Christian Democracy which disappeared after its defeat in the 1977 general elections. Next he joined the Democratic Center Union (UCD) and was its secretary for Vizcaya. He was elected to the Cortes Generales in the 1979 elections from the party. He resigned from the UCD in 1982. He joined the provisional management commission of the People's Democratic Party, of which he was president in the Basque Country and general secretary at national level. Guimón was re-elected deputy in the 1982 elections. In 1986 he joined the People's Alliance and that same year he was elected again a deputy. In the European elections held in 1987 he was elected to the European Parliament.

In 1988 Guimón was one of the signatories of the Ajuria Enea Pact or Agreement for the Pacification of the Basque Country. On 8 August 1989 he resigned from his position as the People's Democratic Party's general secretary in the Basque Country. In 1990 he retired from political life and began to work as the magistrate in the Provincial Court of Álava.

== Later years and death ==
Guimón continued to serve as a magistrate in the Provincial Courts of Vitoria and Bilbao until his death in Bilbao on 10 December 2001. Funeral ceremony for him was held at the El Salvador church in Bilbao.
