= (Pyruvate, water dikinase)-phosphate phosphotransferase =

Class of enzymes

Identifiers
- EC no.: 2.7.4.28

Databases
- IntEnz: IntEnz view
- BRENDA: BRENDA entry
- ExPASy: NiceZyme view
- KEGG: KEGG entry
- MetaCyc: metabolic pathway
- PRIAM: profile
- PDB structures: RCSB PDB PDBe PDBsum
Search
- PMC: articles
- PubMed: articles
- NCBI: proteins

(Pyruvate, water dikinase)-phosphate phosphotransferase (EC 2.7.4.28, PSRP) is an enzyme with systematic name (pyruvate, water dikinase) phosphate:phosphate phosphotransferase. This enzyme catalyses the following chemical reaction

[pyruvate, water dikinase] phosphate + phosphate $\rightleftharpoons$ [pyruvate, water dikinase] + diphosphate

The enzyme from the bacterium Escherichia coli is bifunctional.
