= (Pyruvate, water dikinase) kinase =

Class of enzymes

Identifiers
- EC no.: 2.7.11.33

Databases
- IntEnz: IntEnz view
- BRENDA: BRENDA entry
- ExPASy: NiceZyme view
- KEGG: KEGG entry
- MetaCyc: metabolic pathway
- PRIAM: profile
- PDB structures: RCSB PDB PDBe PDBsum
Search
- PMC: articles
- PubMed: articles
- NCBI: proteins

(Pyruvate, water dikinase) kinase (EC 2.7.11.33, PSRP, PEPS kinase) is an enzyme with systematic name ADP:(pyruvate, water dikinase) phosphotransferase. This enzyme catalyses the following chemical reaction

ADP + [pyruvate, water dikinase] $\rightleftharpoons$ AMP + [pyruvate, water dikinase] phosphate

The enzyme from the bacterium Escherichia coli is bifunctional.
