= Yesca (youth organization) =

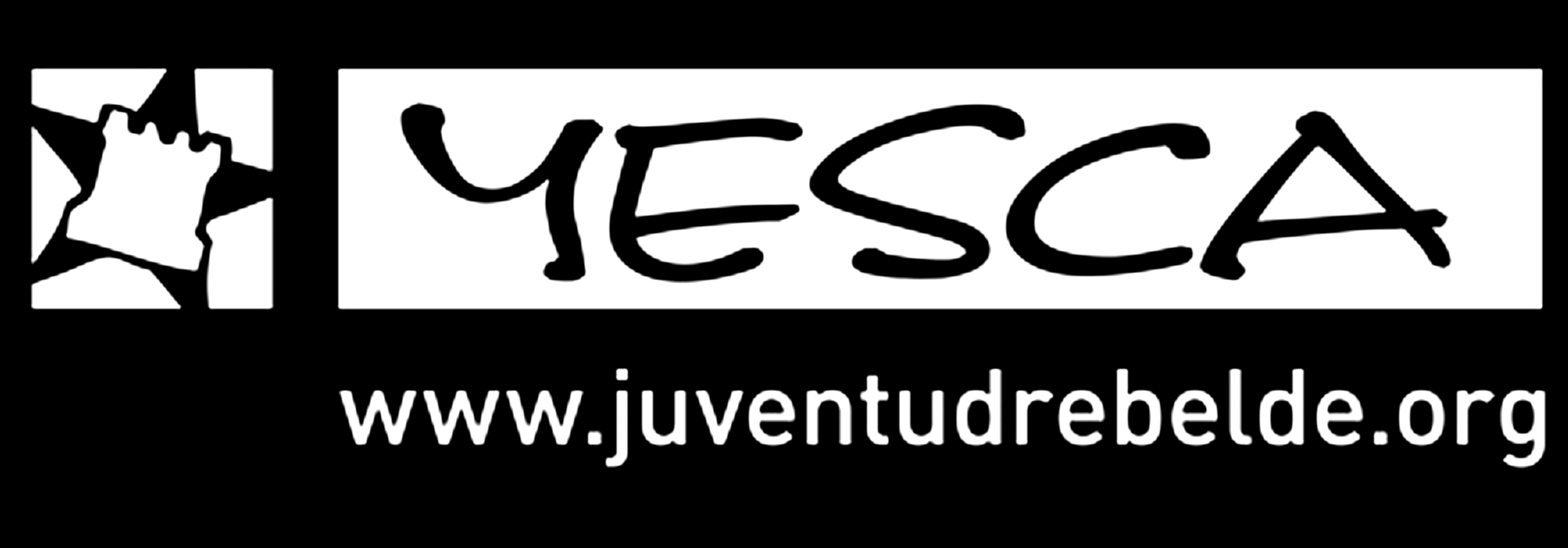
- Founded: 1993; As the Castilian Revolutionary Youth; 2006; As Yesca
- Ideology: Castilian nationalism Independentism; Socialism; Feminism; Anti-fascism
- Mother party: Castilian Left
- Website: juventudrebelde.org

Flag

Yesca is a Castilian nationalist and anticapitalist youth organization in Castile. It's recognized by Castilian Left as its youth referent. Yesca defends the right of self-determination of Castile, a nation that would be integrated by the current Spanish autonomies of Castilla y León, Castilla-La Mancha, Madrid, Cantabria, La Rioja and the area of Requena-Utiel in the Valencian Country.

== History ==
Yesca was founded in 1993 at the city of Burgos, under the name of Castilian Revolutionary Youth, changing its name to Yesca in 2006.

== Organization ==
Yesca currently has local assemblies in Almagro, Ávila, Bolaños de Calatrava, Burgos, Ciudad Real, Cuenca, Madrid, Palencia, Salamanca, Segovia, Soria, Talavera de la Reina, Toledo and Valladolid. In Madrid Yesca is divided in different district assemblies: being currently present in Arganzuela, Barajas, Carabanchel, Tetuán, Vallecas, Vicálvaro and Moratalaz.
