= Manex Goihenetxe =

Basque historian and cultural activist

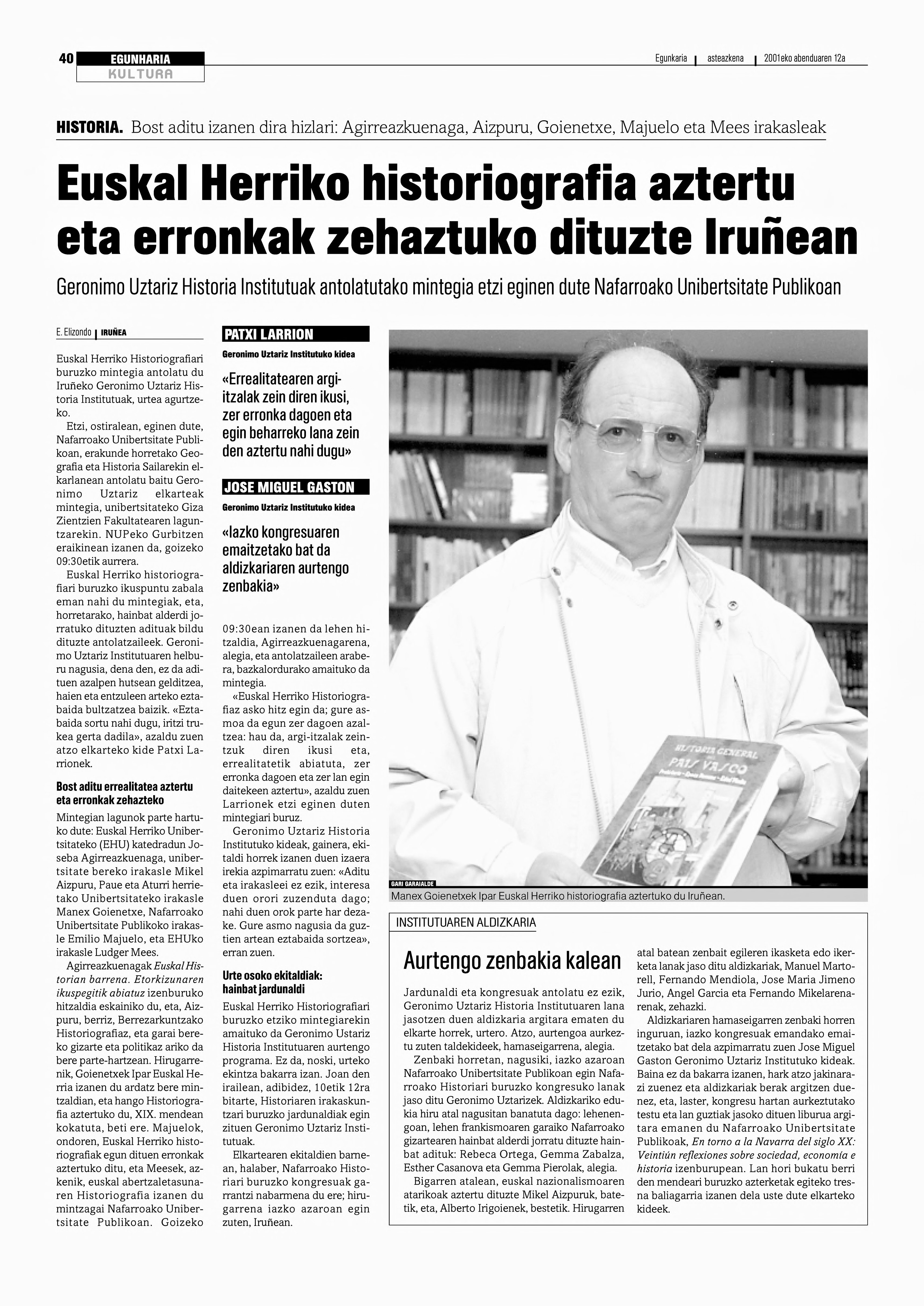
- Goienetxe presenting a book (Euskaldunon Egunkaria, 2001)
- Born: Manex Goihenetxe Etxamendi; 22 September 1942; Estérençuby, EH-NB Low Navarre Basque Country, France
- Died: 2 March 2004 (aged 61); Biscau mountain, Pyrenees, Spain
- Occupations: Politest and basque culture historian

Manex Goihenetxe Etxamendi or Manex Goienetxe (22 September 1942 – 2 March 2004) was a Basque-French historian and cultural activist.

== Biography ==
Born to a farmer family, Goihenetxe went to Great Britain to study. After completing French High School in Roazhon in 1963, he was ordained as a friar in the congregation of Ploermael in 1967. In 1969, he graduated in history at Toulouse, and started working as a teacher. Goihenetxe also got the teacher certification (DEA) at Pau in 1981. He earned his PhD in 1984. He held teaching positions in Oloron, Lourdes, Donibane Lohizune and Kastellin (Brittany).

Goihenetxe wrote for the association "Ikas" from 1972 to 1983. He assumed the chief managerial position of the UEU from 1977 to 1979. On 27 July 1975, he was named associate member by Euskaltzaindia and made partner of Eusko Ikaskuntza. He was Basque school network Seaska's first worker on a payroll as an instructor (1977-1981), as well as holding other responsibilities in Kanbo, Bayonne, and Ziburu (1981-2003). He was also a professor at the University of Pau and Baiona (Bayonne).

Goihenetxe could speak seven languages, i.e. Basque, French, Latin, English, Spanish, Gascon Occitan, and Aragonese. Thanks to his command of these languages, he carried out comprehensive research on the Basque Country. He showed a special commitment to Basque culture and abertzale politics. He got first involved in politics during the Process of Burgos (1970). He was a founder of the political parties Embata and EHAS.

Goihenetxe was registered in the census of Anglet (Labourd) for many years and was also the Basque nationalist candidate of South Anglet in 1999. He devoted one of his books to this town of Labourd.

On 2 May 2004, Goihenetxe accidentally died at Biscau, a mountain in Bearn, along with his partner Anne-Marie Pargade. His ashes were spread in Errozate, near his home village of Estérençuby.

== Works ==
The Histoire générale du Pays Basque serie is a particularly important reference. Goihenetxe was the first to write about it from the Basque Country's point of view.

- Histoire de la Colonisation Française au Pays basque.
- Livre Blanc de la langue et culture basques. (1974)
- Les origines du problème basque. (1975)
- Pays Basque Nord: un peuple colonisé. (1979)
- L´oppression culturelle française au Pays Basque. (1981)
- Uztaritze au milieu du XIIe siecle. (1981)
- Les origines sociales et historiques d'Eskualzaleen Biltzarra (1893-1913). (1984)
- For et coutumes de Basse-Navarre. (1985)
- Bayonne: Guide Historique. (1986)
- Lapurdi Historian (Elkar, 1987, San Sebastián). Liburuen artean euskaraz dagoen bakarra.
- Les Basques et leur histoire. Mythes et réalités. (1993)
- Histoire d’Anglet. (1997)
- Histoire générale du Pays Basque I. (1998)
- Histoire générale du Pays Basque II. (1999)
- Histoire générale du Pays Basque III. (2001)
- Histoire générale du Pays Basque IV. (2002)

Goihenetxe wrote a long review and 20 more or less important parts of a research project. In the Basque scientific community's Inguma database are 36 words written by him.

== Sources ==
- Jean-Louis Davant: Manex Goihenetxe 1942-2006, Bidegileak collection, Eusko Jaurlaritza, Vitoria-Gasteiz, 2006. Interneten hemen
- Manex Goihenetxeren oroitzapenetan artikulua, Pruden Gartzia, "Uztaro" magazine 72. UEU, 2010. Bibliografia zehaztua dakar. Interneten irakurgai.
