= Santiago Brouard =

Basque politician and doctor (1919–1984)

Santi Brouard
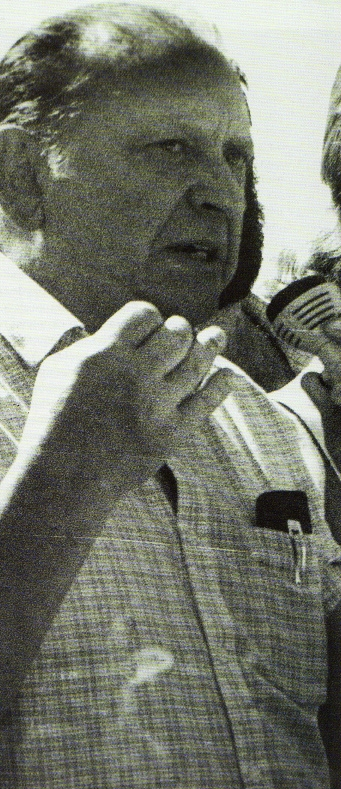
- Santi Brouard at a political rally in 1980

Personal details
- Born: Santiago Brouard; 1919 Lekeitio, Basque Country, Spain
- Died: 20 November 1984 (aged 64–65) Bilbao, Basque Country, Spain
- Manner of death: Assassination
- Party: Herri Batasuna

Santiago Brouard or Santi Brouard (1919 – 20 November 1984) was a doctor and Basque politician. He was one of the leaders of Herri Batasuna, and deputy mayor of Bilbao. He was killed by the Spanish government's death squad, the Grupos Antiterroristas de Liberación (GAL), in one of its highest-profile acts. Broaurd was shot by GAL gunmen Luis Morcillo and Rafael López Ocaña as he left his paediatric clinic in Bilbao.

== Early years ==
Born in the town of Lekeitio, Brouard studied medicine in the university of Valladolid. After finishing his studies, he went back to the Basque Country and specialized in paediatrics in Basurtu hospital. He married Teresa Aldamiz, with whom he had three children. He helped create the first ikastolas (schools where lessons were given in Basque language) in Bizkaia.

== Joining politics ==
In 1974, Brouard had to escape to the Northern Basque Country (French side of the Basque Country) after he treated an ETA member who had been shot by the Spanish police. There he met leading ETA members, such as Argala. He took part in the creation of the KAS alternatiba when Franco's regime was about to end. Brouard was one of the creators of EHAS, the group that after 1977 would be known as HASI. Brouard was named president of HASI and when Herri Batasuna was created, he became a member of that party. He always saw himself as Basque nationalist and socialist.

When he returned from exile, he resumed work as a doctor and remained active in politics. He was sent to prison in 1983 together with other Herri Batasuna members accused of singing the Basque fighters' song Eusko Gudariak when the Spanish King Juan Carlos I went to Gernika. They interrupted his speech and all members who were singing had to be led out of the building, amid protests. He became a member of the National Executive of Herri Batasuna, and later became a deputy in the Spanish parliament in Madrid. At the same time, he was a deputy mayor of Bilbao.

== Death ==
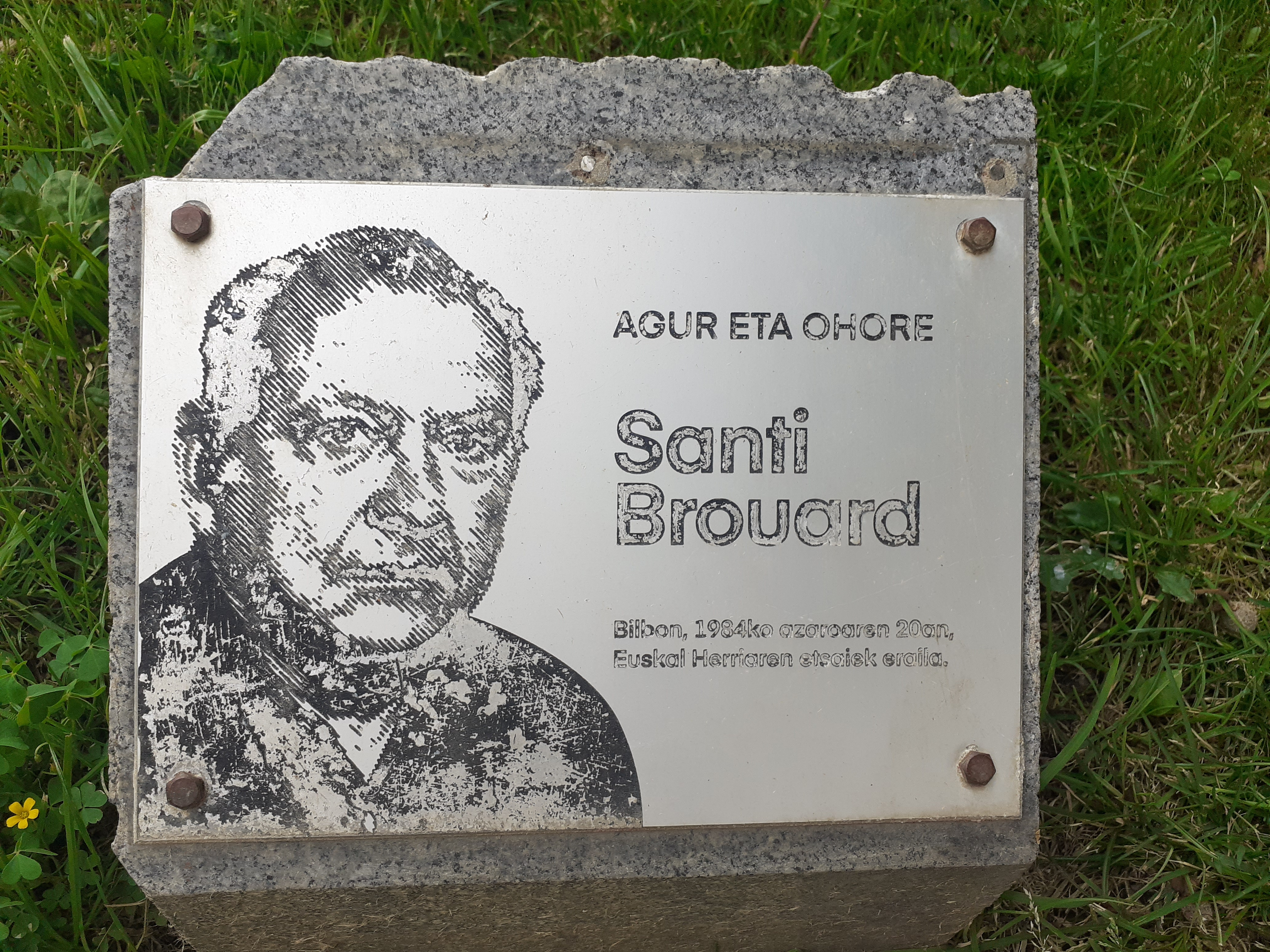
Commemorative plaque in Bilbao.

Santi Brouard had been warned that right-wing Spanish paramilitary groups had targeted him, but he said he would not flee and that he would not lock his office door because of it. On 20 November 1984 Luis Morcillo and Rafael López Ocaña shot him dead at his workplace.

The police investigation identified and accused Morcillo and López Ocaña of killing Brouard, but a judge in the Audiencia Nacional of Spain released them from prison in 1999. In 2013, Morcillo stated that the killing was ordered by Guardia Civil commander Rafael Masa, probably at the instigation of Julián Sancristóbal, then a State Security official. The killers were paid 7.5 m pesetas by the Ministry of the Interior.

== Recognitions ==
- The mayor of Bilbao named a street after Brouard in the neighbourhood of Ametzola.
- The mayor of Lekeitio named the public sportsfield of the town after him.
- On the 40th anniversary of his murder, a public memorial was service held in Bilbao.

== See also ==
- GAL
