= People's Socialist Revolutionary Party =

People's Socialist Revolutionary Party Herri Alderdi Sozialista Iraultzailea
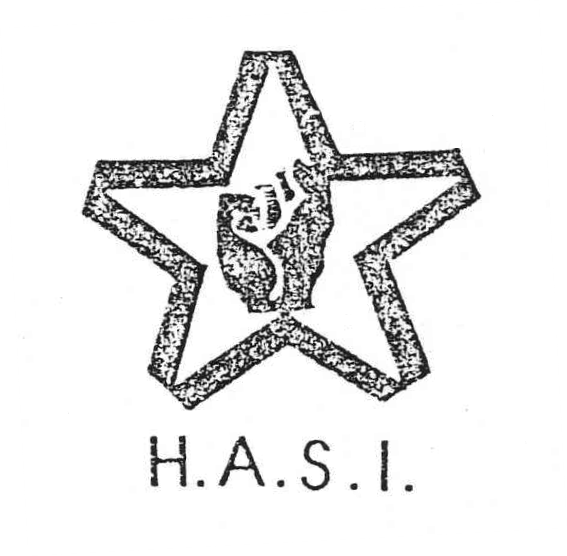
- President: Santiago Brouard (1978–1984)
- Secretary-General: Alberto Figueroa (1977–1978); Txomin Ziluaga (1979–1989)
- Founded: 5 July 1979
- Dissolved: 1992
- Merger of: Euskal Herriko Alderdi Sozialista (EHAS); Eusko Sozialistak (ES)
- Youth wing: Jarrai
- Ideology: Basque independence Communism; Marxism-Leninism; Abertzale Left
- Political position: Far-left
- National affiliation: Herri Batasuna; Koordinadora Abertzale Sozialista

People's Socialist Revolutionary Party (Basque: Herri Alderdi Sozialista Iraultzailea; HASI) was a non-legal Basque political party, considered commonly to be the political branch of ETA. It always ran as part of the coalition of the Basque National Liberation Movement, Herri Batasuna, until its self-dissolution in the 1990s. The party's acronym "HASI" means "to begin" in Basque language.
