= Castilian Left =

Castilian Left Izquierda Castellana
- Leader: Luis Ocampo
- Founded: 2002
- Merger of: Izquierda Comunera; Unidad Popular Castellana; Partido Comunista del Pueblo Castellano; Círculo Castellano de Toledo
- Youth wing: Yesca
- Ideology: Socialism; Left-wing nationalism Feminism; Castilian nationalism
- Political position: Left-wing
- National affiliation: Popular Unity (2015–2016); Unidos Podemos (2016)
- Women organization: Mujeres Castellanas
- Colours: Purple

Website
- www.izca.net

Izquierda Castellana's flag

The Castilian Left (Spanish: Izquierda Castellana, IzCa) is a leftist nationalist political movement active in the Spanish autonomous communities of Castile-La Mancha, Castile and Leon and Community of Madrid. It strives to advocate for the national recognition of Castile, and in some cases, its independence. Other current political parties include Tierra Comunera, Castilian Party, and Ahora Castilla.

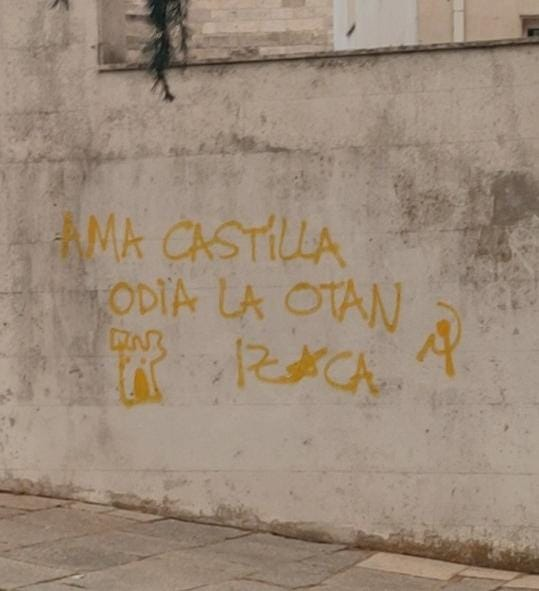
A graffiti by the Castilian Left in Burgos against NATO

== History ==
Castilian Left and the other parties are categorized as part of a major political movement known as Castilian nationalism. It defends the traditions and values from the rebels of the Castilian War of the Communities, so they call themselves "comuneros". As a group of Castilian nationalists, they also seek to unify the other Spanish Autonomous Communities of Cantabria, Castile y Leon, Castile-La Mancha, La Rioja, and Madrid. Izquierda Castellana constituted a definitive movement in Madrid by the year 2002, as a section of Izquierda Comunera, which also included the organizations Unidad Popular Castellana, YESCA (formerly known as Juventudes Castellanas Revolucionarias), Mujeres Castellanas and the Círculo Castellano de Toledo. The Communist Party of the Castilian People (a section of the Communist Party of the Peoples of Spain in the autonomous region of Castilla y León) joined on as part of Izquierda Castellana, but later left the organization. Izquierda Castellana also supports various nationalist movements around the world, such as those in the Basque Country, Palestine or Ireland, emphasizing a democratic perspective and the sovereignty of the working class.

== Ideology ==
The goal of Izquierda Castellana is the attainment of what they call a united Castile, overcoming the current division of the Castilian "nation" between five autonomous regions (Cantabria, Castile and León, Madrid, La Rioja and Castile-La Mancha) and a comarca (Requena-Utiel in the Valencian Community). It emphasizes socialism, sovereignty and republicanism, principles it reaffirms each year on April 23, in a special ceremony in the municipality of Villalar de los Comuneros. This day is celebrated by Castilian nationalist organizations such as Izquierda Castellana and Tierra Comunera as the National Day of Castile, but officially it is the festivity of the autonomous region of Castile and León.

== Tierra Comunera ==
A Castilian nationalist political party that seeks the defense of the rights and freedoms of the Castilian people, the constant exercise of their decision-making capacity, the progressive transformation of their society in order to achieve freedom and the preservation of their historical heritage, as the most valuable legacy to pass on to future generations. It currently does not assume a social, economic, and cultural role that defines Castile. It holds great value towards many aspects of the human nature, which includes cultural and environmental ideals, its production of raw materials of high quality, and most importantly, the existence of a political power at the service of its citizens, should allow the Castilian people build a society more prosperous and developed, that satisfaction appropriate to the needs of the people. As an organization that is fully committed to unify the Castilians amongst themselves and the rest of Spain, Tierra Comunera is responsible for multiple organized experiences that are developed by the people giving them continuity and gathering the best thing of all of them to plan a way that incorporates the illusion of all the persons and sectors that believe for a possible and united Castile.

== Yesca ==
A Castilian youth organization that specialized in combat action that creates struggles by the Revolutionary Youth of their land: Castilla. Yesca arose from the militant representation that during the decade of the 90s and the early years of the new millennium that was carried out by the Revolutionary Youth Castilian. It was not simply a change of name but the natural evolution of the project after years of struggles and experiences of another step in the construction of a real Spanish organization qualified to give answers to the problems that they suffer as young. Yesca is committed to bring together people that want to real changes in society, fighting from the framework of the construction of Castile between everyone. It is something that traditionally ignite the spark; the symbolic name presents to us as what we aspire to be and a catalytic tool of ideas and actions that will lead us to kindle the flame of the social revolution, gender and national they need.

== Villalar de los Comuneros ==
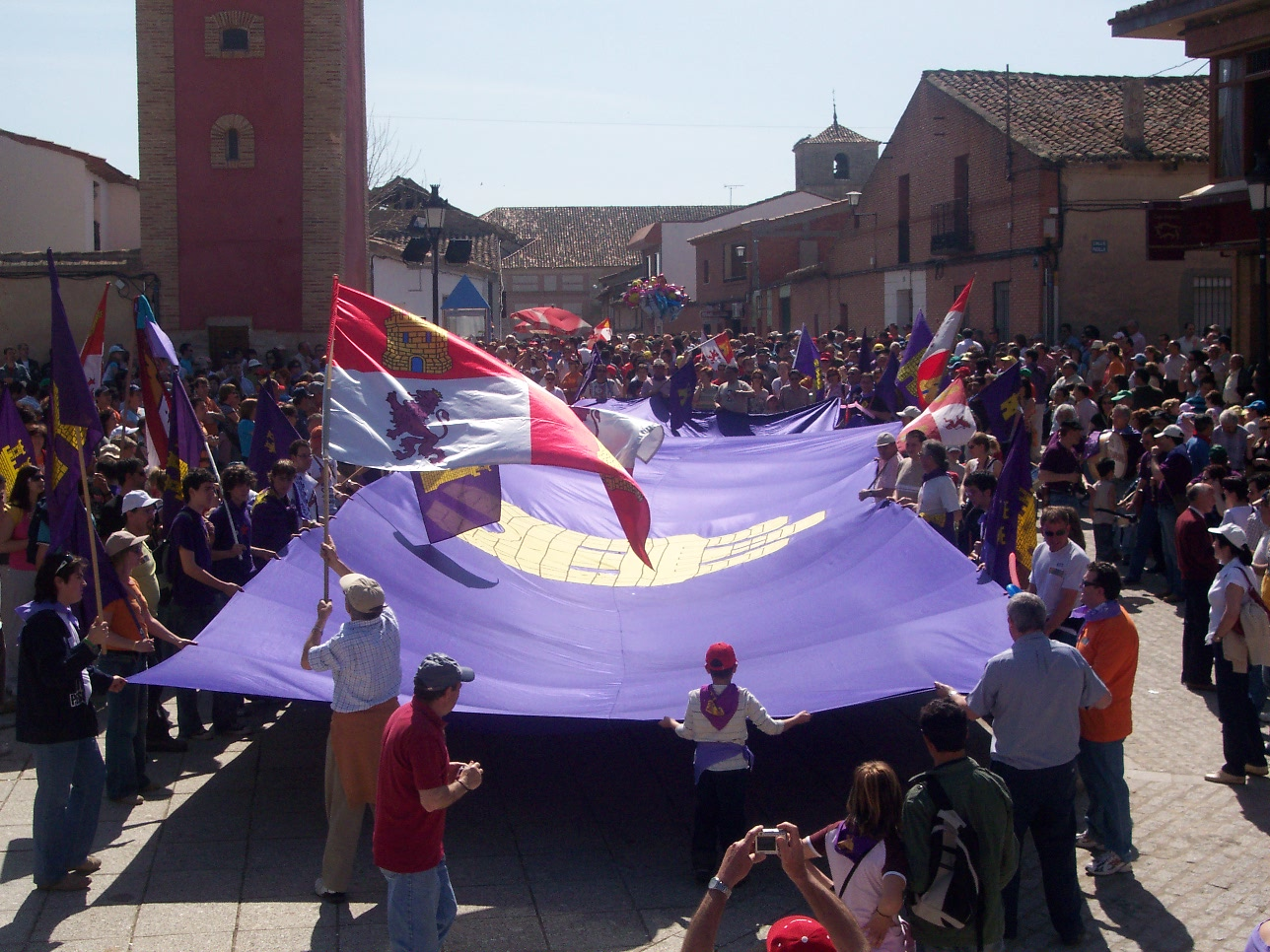
Day of Castile in Villalar de los Comuneros.

For the last three decades, tens of thousands of Castilian attend "Villarlar of the Comuneros" on April 23 to celebrate the day of Castile. The Battle of Villalar was a battle in the Revolt of the Comuneros fought near the town of Villalar in Valladolid province, Spain. The royalist supporters of King Charles I won a crushing victory over the comuneros rebels. Three of the most important rebel leaders were captured, Juan de Padilla, Juan Bravo, and Francisco Maldonado. They were executed the next day, effectively ending armed resistance to Charles I. The Battle of Villalar represents an important historical event in Castile because it marked the end of autocratic Spanish monarchy.
