= Castilian nationalism =

Fringe Spanish political movement

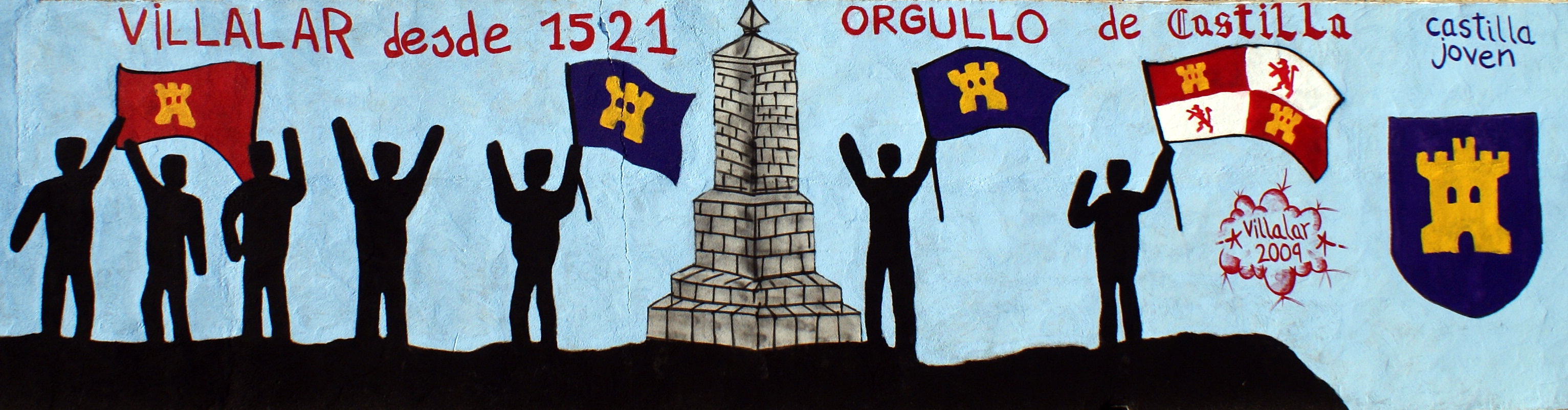
Castilianist mural in Villalar de los Comuneros

The purple flag displaying a red star and a yellow castle is used by contemporary organizations advocating for a sovereign Castile as a Socialist republic consisting of seventeen provinces.

Castilian nationalism or "Castilianism" (Spanish: castellanismo) is a fringe political movement that advocates for the national recognition of Castile, and in some cases, its independence from Spain.

== History ==
The 19th century saw the development of what historian Celso Almuiña terms as a Castilian "regio-nationalism", fostered by a sense of grievance against Catalonia among the Conservative milieus (supportive of the protectionist interests of the flour-making Bourgeoisie) who pitted themselves against central power in the wake of the 1843 free trading policies brought forward by Espartero.

During the Second Republic, Castilian nationalist postulates were fringe, adopting a merely "mimetic and defensive" role that tended to fade towards otherwise strongly anti-Catalanist regionalist stances, just as it had been previously the case with the messages of Burgos (1918) and Segovia (1919).

A new sovereignist and internationalist leftist iteration of Castilianism, characterised by the most radical rejection of the identification of 'Castile' with 'Spain' (referred to as Spanish State among its followers), emerged after the creation of Castilian Popular Unity (UPC) in 1983, and, most notably, Castilian Left (IzCa) in 2000.

== See also ==
- Castilian people
