= Basque Country independence =

Movement for Basque autonomy

Flag of the Basque Country

Basque independence refers to the political movement seeking full sovereignty for the Basque Country from Spain and France. According to the latest public opinion survey conducted by the Basque Government in November 2024, 19% of respondents expressed support for independence, while 43% were opposed, and 33% stated that their position would depend on the circumstances.

== Constitutional background ==
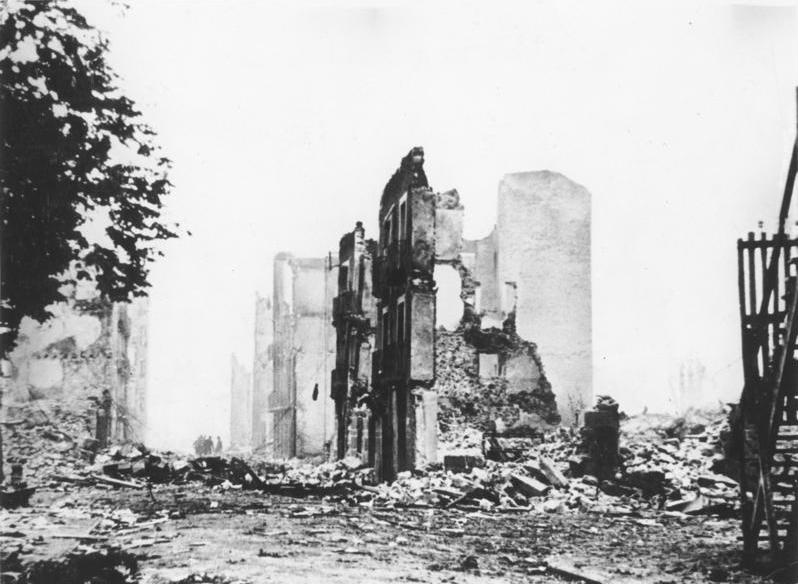
1937 image of Guernica

After a period of self-government, the Basque government was abolished by the Spanish government in 1939.

Under the Spanish Franco regime during the Spanish Civil War, the Basque language was banned, the rights of Basques were reduced, and the Basque city of Guernica was bombed on behalf of Franco by the Nazis. In response, the Basque nationalist group, Euskadi Ta Askatasuna (ETA) was established in 1959 and was responsible for the deaths of over 800 people before it was disbanded in May 2018.

== Re-establishment of autonomy ==
Basque Country location and provinces in Europe

In 1978 a special status was given to "historic nationalities"; the Basque country, Catalonia and Galicia. Pre-autonomous bodies would write up a statute of autonomy which would be subject to a referendum.

Basque leaders submitted a draft of the Statute of Gernika in the same year and the Spanish government then brought about a referendum in October 1979. Basque self-governance returned in 1979.

In accordance with the fueros, the Basque country (and Navarre) are permitted to collect their own taxes in a manner that generally conforms to Spanish tax collection. During 1979–80, a “constitutional shield” was negotiated, where 6.24% of local tax would be sent to the Spanish central government.

The Autonomous Community of the Basque Country (known as Euskadi since 1979) is made up of the herrialdes (territories) of Araba, Biscay, and Gipuzkoa. These three herrialdes have their own Assembly. Navarre has been constituted as a Foral Community since 1982.

The other three herrialdes, located in France and collectively known as Iparralde, have since 2017 had their own government body of the Agglomeration community of the Basque Country.

== Political parties ==
The two main Basque political parties in the Southern Basque Country (Hegoalde) are the Basque Nationalist Party and Euskal Herria Bildu. Both advocate for an independent Basque country within a confederal relationship with Spain.

In Navarre, the Basque Nationalist Party is one of the three parties of the Geroa Bai alliance (centre-left to centre-right) which advocates for the right of Navarre to decide its own future.

In French Basque Country (Iparralde), Euskal Herria Bai calls for sovereignty of the Basque Country.

== Public displays of support ==
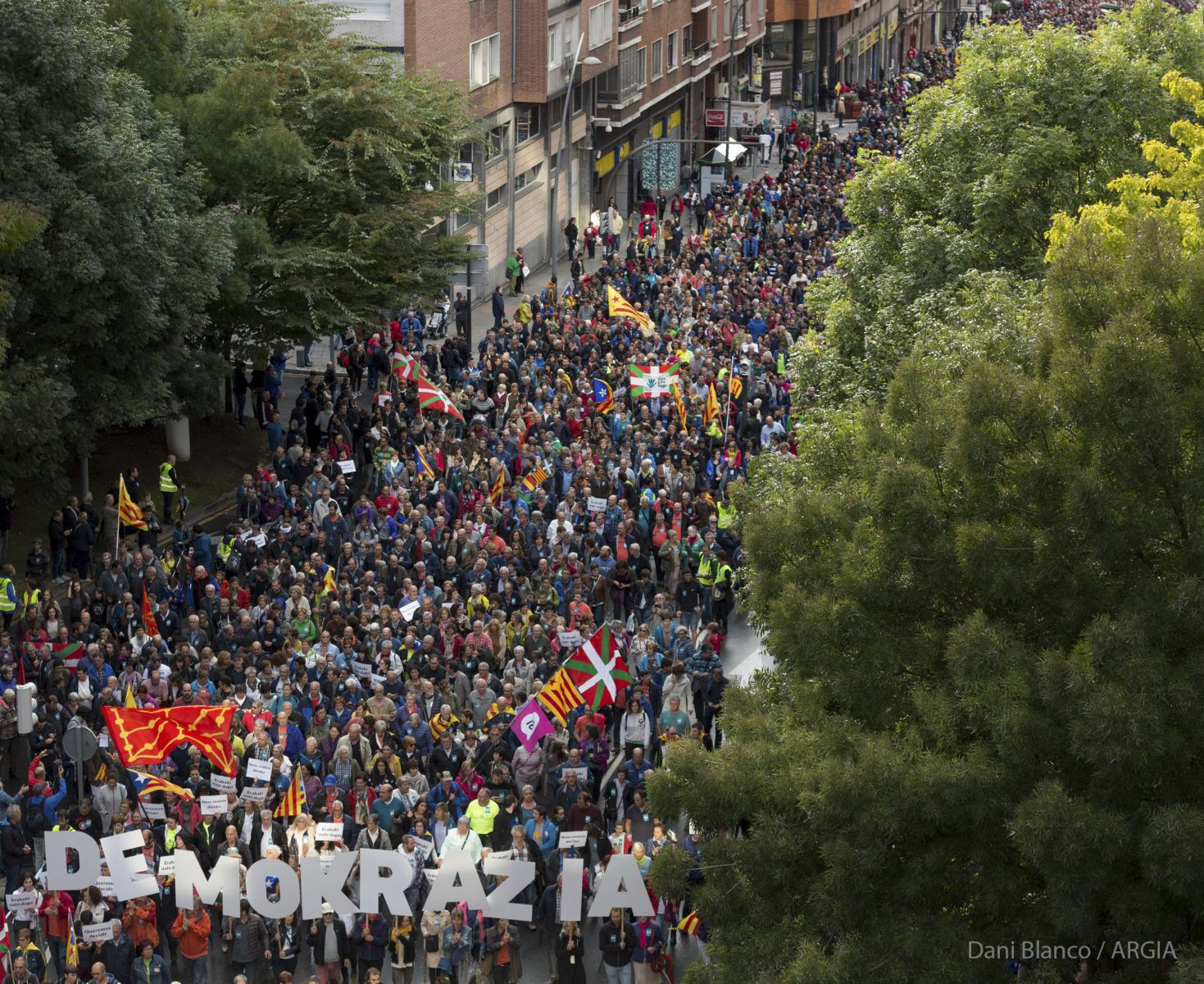
Demonstration in Bilbao in solidarity with the 2017 Catalan independence referendum

In 1997, around 20,000 marched in San Sebastián calling for independence.

In 2006, thousands of Basques marched in Bilbao for self determination rights for the Basque Country, November 11, 2006.

In 2011, around 40,000 people marched through Bilbao calling for ETA prisoners to be moved closer to their homes and for an amnesty.

In 2014, 110,000 people marched in Bilbao in support of Basque independence and bringing ETA prisoners to be held closer to home.

In 2017, over 40,000 people marched in Bilbao in support of Catalan independence.

In June 2018, a human chain was formed by tens of thousands of Basques, extending 202 km. Around 200,000 people formed the human chain calling for an independence referendum.

== Polling ==
The Euskobarómetro study in 2006 by the University of the Basque Country found that 33% of Basques had a “great or moderate desire” for independence from Spain with 47% with “little or no desire for Basque sovereignty.” In 2010, these changed to 30% and 55% respectively and in 2014 to 34% and 52%.

A 2018 poll showed that 32% supported independence with 39% opposing.

A 2019 poll showed that 31% supported independence with 48% opposing. 27% had a great desire for independence, 29% had a little desire for independence and 38% had no desire for independence.

A 2020 poll showed that 41% supported holding a referendum on Basque independence with 31% opposing. The first Naziometroa poll on Basque independence showed that 42.5% were in favour of an independent Basque state with 31.5% opposing.

The second Naziometroa poll of March 2021 showed that 39.5% would be in favour of an independent Basque State with 29.5% against.

The third Naziometroa poll of November 2021 showed that 40.5% were in favour of an independent Basque state, with 29.2% against, “all or most of the political parties have agreed to hold a referendum on an independent Basque state, it has been approved by Madrid/Paris, and is therefore fully recognised and official”.

== See also ==
- Basque nationalism
- Basque Republic
- Catalan independence movement
- Galician independence movement
- National and regional identity in Spain
- List of active separatist movements in Europe
