= Gipuzkoa (Basque Parliament constituency) =

Coordinates: 43°10′N 2°10′W

- Basque Parliament; Electoral constituency
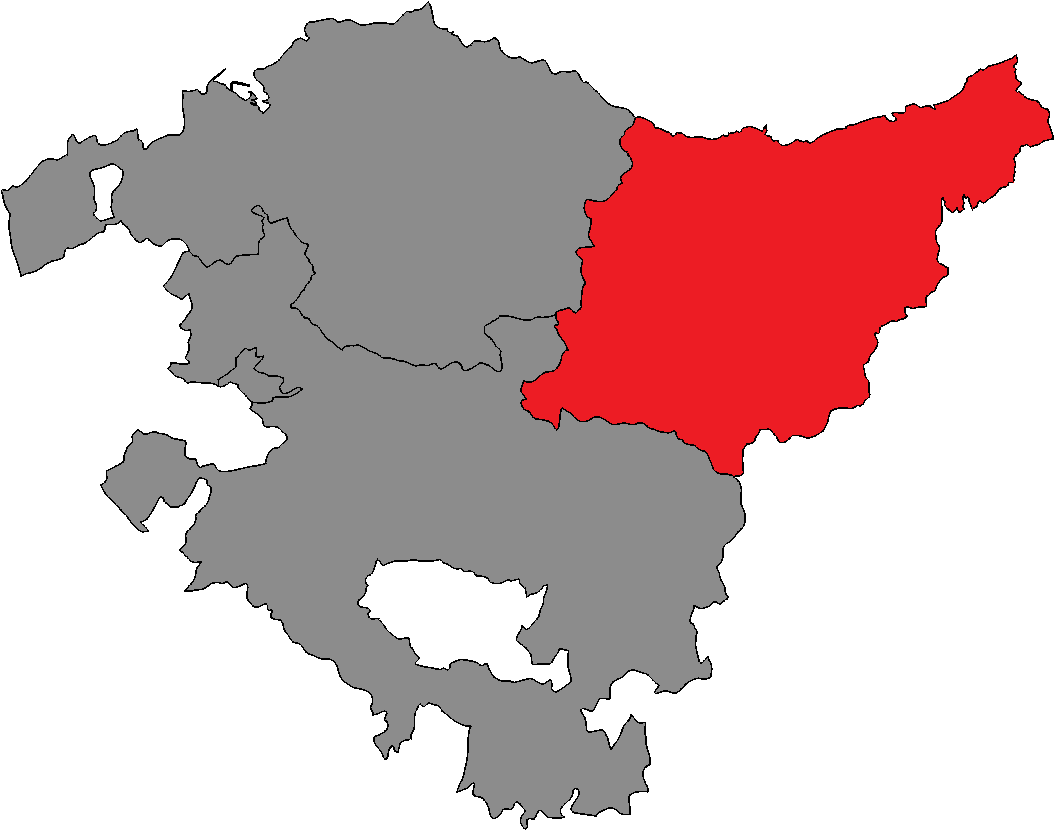
- Location of Gipuzkoa within the Basque Country
- Province: Gipuzkoa
- Autonomous community: Basque Country
- Population: ▲731,182 (2024)
- Electorate: ▲587,712 (2024)
- Major settlements: Donostia-San Sebastián, Irún

Current constituency
- Created: 1980
- Seats: 20 (1980–1984); 25 (1984–present)
- Members: EH Bildu (11); PNV (9); PSE–EE (4); PP (1)

Gipuzkoa (Spanish: Guipúzcoa) is one of the three constituencies (Spanish: circunscripciones) represented in the Basque Parliament, the regional legislature of the Basque Autonomous Community. The constituency currently elects 25 deputies. Its boundaries correspond to those of the Spanish province of Gipuzkoa. The electoral system uses the D'Hondt method and closed-list proportional representation, with a minimum threshold of three percent.

== Electoral system ==
The constituency was created as per the Statute of Autonomy for the Basque Country of 1979 and was first contested in the 1980 regional election. The Statute provided for the three provinces in the Basque Country—Álava, Biscay and Gipuzkoa—to be established as multi-member districts in the Basque Parliament, with this regulation being maintained under the 1983 and 1990 regional electoral laws. Each constituency is allocated a fixed number of 25 seats each, to provide for an equal representation of the three provinces in Parliament as required under the regional Statute. The exception was the 1980 election, when this number was 60.

Voting is on the basis of universal suffrage, which comprises all nationals over eighteen, registered in the Basque Country and in full enjoyment of their political rights. Amendments to the electoral law in 2011 required for Basques abroad to apply for voting before being permitted to vote, a system known as "begged" or expat vote (Spanish: Voto rogado) which was abolished in 2022. Seats are elected using the D'Hondt method and a closed list proportional representation, with an electoral threshold of three percent of valid votes—which, until 1983 and from 1990 includes blank ballots; also and until a 2000 reform, the threshold was set at five percent—being applied in each constituency. The use of the D'Hondt method may result in a higher effective threshold, depending on the district magnitude.

The electoral law allows for parties and federations registered in the interior ministry, coalitions and groupings of electors to present lists of candidates. Parties and federations intending to form a coalition ahead of an election are required to inform the relevant Electoral Commission within ten days of the election call—fifteen before 1985—whereas groupings of electors need to secure the signature of at least one percent of the electorate in the constituencies for which they seek election—one-thousandth of the electorate, with a compulsory minimum of 500 signatures, until 1983; and only the signature of 500 electors from 1983 to 1990—disallowing electors from signing for more than one list of candidates.

== Deputies ==
Deputies 1980–present
Key to parties HB EH EHAK EH Bildu (Note: From 2023.) EH Bildu (Note: Until 2023.) IU/EB EB–B Elkarrekin Podemos Aralar EE PSE/PSE–EE EA PNV/PNV–EA UCD PP+Cs PP CP
Parliament	Election	Distribution
1st	1980	4 / 3 / 3 / 9 / 1
2nd	1984	5 / 2 / 6 / 11 / 1
3rd	1986	6 / 3 / 6 / 6 / 4
4th	1990	6 / 2 / 5 / 5 / 6 / 1
5th	1994	6 / 2 / 4 / 4 / 6 / 3
6th	1998	7 / 4 / 4 / 6 / 4
7th	2001	4 / 1 / 4 / 12 / 4
8th	2005	5 / 1 / 1 / 5 / 10 / 3
9th	2009	1 / 2 / 8 / 1 / 10 / 3
10th	2012	9 / 5 / 9 / 2
11th	2016	8 / 3 / 3 / 9 / 2
12th	2020	9 / 2 / 3 / 10 / 1
13th	2024	11 / 4 / 9 / 1

== Regional elections ==
=== 2024 ===
Summary of the 21 April 2024 Basque Parliament election results in Gipuzkoa
Parties and alliances	Popular vote			Seats	
Parties and alliances	Votes	%	±pp	Total	+/−
Basque Country Gather (EH Bildu)	137,308	39.82	+4.90	11	+2
Basque Nationalist Party (EAJ/PNV)	108,227	31.38	–4.70	9	–1
Socialist Party of the Basque Country–Basque Country Left (PSE–EE (PSOE))	46,266	13.42	+0.64	4	+1
People's Party (PP)^{1}	22,071	6.40	+1.76	1	±0
Unite (Sumar)^{2}	10,617	3.08	n/a	0	–1
United We Can–Green Alliance (Podemos/Ahal Dugu–AV)^{2}	7,469	2.17	n/a	0	–1
Vox (Vox)	5,218	1.51	+0.19	0	±0
Animalist Party with the Environment (PACMA)^{3}	1,784	0.52	+0.07	0	±0
Blank Seats to Leave Empty Seats (EB/AZ)	1,161	0.34	+0.04	0	±0
To Be (Izan)	639	0.19	New	0	±0
For a Fairer World (PUM+J)	462	0.13	+0.06	0	±0
Blank ballots	3,626	1.05	+0.10		
Total	344,848			25	±0
Valid votes	344,848	99.46	–0.04		
Invalid votes	1,864	0.54	+0.04		
Votes cast / turnout	346,712	58.99	+6.81		
Abstentions	241,000	41.01	–6.81		
Registered voters	587,712				
Sources
Footnotes: ^{1} People's Party results are compared to People's Party+Citizens totals in the 2020 election.; ^{2} Within the United We Can–United Left alliance in the 2020 election.; ^{3} Animalist Party with the Environment results are compared to Animalist Party Against Mistreatment of Animals totals in the 2020 election.

=== 2020 ===
Summary of the 12 July 2020 Basque Parliament election results in Gipuzkoa
Parties and alliances	Popular vote			Seats	
Parties and alliances	Votes	%	±pp	Total	+/−
Basque Nationalist Party (EAJ/PNV)	109,554	36.08	+1.99	10	+1
Basque Country Gather (EH Bildu)	106,027	34.92	+6.24	9	+1
Socialist Party of the Basque Country–Basque Country Left (PSE–EE (PSOE))	38,795	12.78	+1.03	3	±0
United We Can–United Left (Podemos/Ahal Dugu, Ezker Anitza–IU)	21,568	7.10	–7.09	2	–1
People's Party+Citizens (PP+Cs)^{1}	14,086	4.64	–4.23	1	–1
Vox (Vox)	4,020	1.32	New	0	±0
Equo Greens–Basque Country Greens (Equo Berdeak–Verdes)	3,439	1.13	New	0	±0
Animalist Party Against Mistreatment of Animals (PACMA/ATTKAA)	1,357	0.45	–0.29	0	±0
Blank Seats (EB/AZ)	911	0.30	New	0	±0
Zero Cuts–The Greens–Municipalists (Recortes Cero–LV–M)	362	0.12	–0.11	0	±0
For a Fairer World (PUM+J)	208	0.07	New	0	±0
Libertarian Party (P–LIB)	176	0.06	New	0	±0
Free for the Basque Country (LxE/EaL)	171	0.06	New	0	±0
Spanish Christian Democratic Union (UCDE)	121	0.04	New	0	±0
Blank ballots	2,874	0.95	+0.33		
Total	303,669			25	±0
Valid votes	303,669	99.50	–0.19		
Invalid votes	1,531	0.50	+0.19		
Votes cast / turnout	305,200	52.18	–7.20		
Abstentions	279,706	47.82	+7.20		
Registered voters	584,906				
Sources
Footnotes: ^{1} People's Party+Citizens results are compared to the combined totals of People's Party and Citizens–Party of the Citizenry in the 2016 election.

=== 2016 ===
Summary of the 25 September 2016 Basque Parliament election results in Gipuzkoa
Parties and alliances	Popular vote			Seats	
Parties and alliances	Votes	%	±pp	Total	+/−
Basque Nationalist Party (EAJ/PNV)	117,260	34.09	+2.51	9	±0
Basque Country Gather (EH Bildu)	98,663	28.68	–3.08	8	–1
United We Can (Podemos, Ezker Anitza–IU, Equo)^{1}	48,800	14.19	+10.79	3	+3
Socialist Party of the Basque Country–Basque Country Left (PSE–EE (PSOE))	40,425	11.75	–7.27	3	–2
People's Party (PP)	24,766	7.20	–1.21	2	±0
Citizens–Party of the Citizenry (C's)	5,730	1.67	New	0	±0
Animalist Party Against Mistreatment of Animals (PACMA/ATTKAA)	2,535	0.74	+0.37	0	±0
Let's Win the Basque Country: Yes We Can (Ganemos Irabazi)	1,856	0.54	New	0	±0
Zero Cuts–Green Group (Recortes Cero–GV)	806	0.23	New	0	±0
Family and Life Party (PFyV)	805	0.23	New	0	±0
Navarrese Freedom (Ln)	191	0.06	New	0	±0
Blank ballots	2,119	0.62	–0.68		
Total	343,956			25	±0
Valid votes	343,956	99.69	+0.27		
Invalid votes	1,064	0.31	–0.27		
Votes cast / turnout	345,020	59.38	–3.90		
Abstentions	236,002	40.62	+3.90		
Registered voters	581,022				
Sources
Footnotes: ^{1} United We Can results are compared to the combined totals of United Left–The Greens: Plural Left and Equo Greens–Basque Ecologists in the 2012 election.

=== 2012 ===
Summary of the 21 October 2012 Basque Parliament election results in Gipuzkoa
Parties and alliances	Popular vote			Seats	
Parties and alliances	Votes	%	±pp	Total	+/−
Basque Country Gather (EH Bildu)^{1}	115,086	31.76	+16.41	9	+6
Basque Nationalist Party (EAJ/PNV)	114,446	31.58	–4.91	9	–1
Socialist Party of the Basque Country–Basque Country Left (PSE–EE (PSOE))	68,915	19.02	–11.16	5	–3
People's Party (PP)	30,461	8.41	–2.05	2	–1
United Left–The Greens: Plural Left (IU–LV)	9,630	2.66	New	0	±0
Union, Progress and Democracy (UPyD)	5,231	1.44	–0.29	0	±0
United Left–Greens (EB–B)	5,040	1.39	–2.27	0	–1
Blank Seats (EB/AZ)	3,573	0.99	New	0	±0
Equo Greens–Basque Ecologists (Equo)^{2}	2,682	0.74	+0.18	0	±0
Animalist Party Against Mistreatment of Animals (PACMA/ATTKAA)	1,345	0.37	New	0	±0
For a Fairer World (PUM+J)	679	0.19	–0.15	0	±0
Humanist Party (PH)	335	0.09	New	0	±0
Communist Unification of Spain (UCE)	223	0.06	New	0	±0
Blank ballots	4,721	1.30	+0.07		
Total	362,367			25	±0
Valid votes	362,367	99.42	+12.91		
Invalid votes	2,099	0.58	–12.91		
Votes cast / turnout	364,466	63.28	+1.52		
Abstentions	211,469	36.72	–1.52		
Registered voters	575,935				
Sources
Footnotes: ^{1} Basque Country Gather results are compared to the combined totals of Aralar and Basque Solidarity in the 2009 election.; ^{2} Equo Greens–Basque Ecologists results are compared to The Greens totals in the 2009 election.

=== 2009 ===
Summary of the 1 March 2009 Basque Parliament election results in Guipúzcoa
Parties and alliances	Popular vote			Seats	
Parties and alliances	Votes	%	±pp	Total	+/−
Basque Nationalist Party (EAJ/PNV)^{1}	112,101	36.49	n/a	10	+4
Socialist Party of the Basque Country–Basque Country Left (PSE–EE (PSOE))	92,714	30.18	+10.04	8	+3
People's Party (PP)	32,123	10.46	–2.76	3	±0
Aralar (Aralar)	31,262	10.18	+6.25	2	+1
Basque Solidarity (EA)^{1}	15,885	5.17	n/a	1	–3
United Left–Greens (EB–B)	11,240	3.66	–1.55	1	±0
Union, Progress and Democracy (UPyD)	5,327	1.73	New	0	±0
The Greens (B/LV)	1,708	0.56	New	0	±0
For a Fairer World (PUM+J)	1,048	0.34	New	0	±0
Communist Party of the Basque Homelands (PCTV/EHAK)	n/a	n/a	–18.09	0	–5
Blank ballots	3,793	1.23	+0.50		
Total	307,201			25	±0
Valid votes	307,201	86.51	–13.19		
Invalid votes	47,908	13.49	+13.19		
Votes cast / turnout	355,109	61.76	–5.86		
Abstentions	219,875	36.72	+5.86		
Registered voters	574,984				
Sources
Footnotes: ^{1} Within the Basque Nationalist Party–Basque Solidarity alliance in the 2005 election.

=== 2005 ===
Summary of the 17 April 2005 Basque Parliament election results in Guipúzcoa
Parties and alliances	Popular vote			Seats	
Parties and alliances	Votes	%	±pp	Total	+/−
Basque Nationalist Party–Basque Solidarity (PNV–EA)	148,884	38.02	–6.31	10	–2
Socialist Party of the Basque Country–Basque Country Left (PSE–EE (PSOE))	78,871	20.14	+4.01	5	+1
Communist Party of the Basque Homelands (PCTV/EHAK)^{1}	70,834	18.09	+2.97	5	+1
People's Party (PP)	51,780	13.22	–4.82	3	–1
United Left–Greens (EB–B)^{2}	20,388	5.21	+0.04	1	±0
Aralar (Aralar)	15,396	3.93	New	1	+1
Greens–Anti-Bullfighting Party Against Mistreatment of Animals (B–PACMA)	1,333	0.34	New	0	±0
Internationalist Socialist Workers' Party (POSI)	621	0.16	New	0	±0
Humanist Party (PH)	500	0.13	–0.14	0	±0
Alavese Unity (UA)	136	0.03	New	0	±0
Blank ballots	2,851	0.73	–0.07		
Total	391,594			25	±0
Valid votes	391,594	99.70	+0.13		
Invalid votes	1,182	0.30	–0.13		
Votes cast / turnout	392,776	67.62	–11.06		
Abstentions	188,124	32.38	+11.06		
Registered voters	580,900				
Sources
Footnotes: ^{1} Communist Party of the Basque Homelands results are compared to Basque Citizens totals in the 2001 election.; ^{2} United Left–Greens results are compared to United Left totals in the 2001 election.

=== 2001 ===
Summary of the 13 May 2001 Basque Parliament election results in Guipúzcoa
Parties and alliances	Popular vote			Seats	
Parties and alliances	Votes	%	±pp	Total	+/−
Basque Nationalist Party–Basque Solidarity (PNV–EA)^{1}	203,445	44.33	+8.69	12	+2
People's Party (PP)^{2}	82,792	18.04	+1.49	4	±0
Socialist Party of the Basque Country–Basque Country Left (PSE–EE (PSOE))	74,042	16.13	+0.09	4	±0
Basque Citizens (EH)	69,409	15.12	–10.09	4	–3
United Left (IU/EB)	23,731	5.17	+0.58	1	+1
Humanist Party (PH)	1,252	0.27	+0.02	0	±0
Carlist Party (EKA/PC)	310	0.07	New	0	±0
Freedom (Askatasuna)	269	0.06	New	0	±0
Blank ballots	3,669	0.80	–0.61		
Total	458,919			25	±0
Valid votes	458,919	99.57	+0.03		
Invalid votes	1,969	0.43	–0.03		
Votes cast / turnout	460,888	78.68	+8.63		
Abstentions	124,862	21.32	–8.63		
Registered voters	585,750				
Sources
Footnotes: ^{1} Basque Nationalist Party–Basque Solidarity results are compared to the combined totals of Basque Nationalist Party and Basque Solidarity in the 1998 election.; ^{2} People's Party results are compared to the combined totals of the People's Party and Alavese Unity in the 1998 election.

=== 1998 ===
Summary of the 25 October 1998 Basque Parliament election results in Guipúzcoa
Parties and alliances	Popular vote			Seats	
Parties and alliances	Votes	%	±pp	Total	+/−
Basque Citizens (EH)^{1}	103,057	25.21	+2.08	7	+1
Basque Nationalist Party (EAJ/PNV)	88,857	21.74	–0.56	6	±0
People's Party (PP)	67,112	16.42	+4.54	4	+1
Socialist Party of the Basque Country–Basque Country Left (PSE–EE (PSOE))	65,548	16.04	–0.34	4	±0
Basque Solidarity (EA)	56,821	13.90	–2.82	4	±0
United Left (IU/EB)	18,744	4.59	–2.49	0	–2
Natural Law Party (PLN/LNA)	1,339	0.33	New	0	±0
Humanist Party (PH)	1,009	0.25	New	0	±0
Alavese Unity (UA)	520	0.13	–0.13	0	±0
Blank ballots	5,770	1.41	–0.74		
Total	408,777			25	±0
Valid votes	408,777	99.54	+0.09		
Invalid votes	1,870	0.46	–0.09		
Votes cast / turnout	410,647	70.05	+11.92		
Abstentions	175,539	29.95	–11.92		
Registered voters	586,186				
Sources
Footnotes: ^{1} Basque Citizens results are compared to Popular Unity totals in the 1994 election.

=== 1994 ===
Summary of the 23 October 1994 Basque Parliament election results in Guipúzcoa
Parties and alliances	Popular vote			Seats	
Parties and alliances	Votes	%	±pp	Total	+/−
Popular Unity (HB)	75,294	23.13	–0.45	6	±0
Basque Nationalist Party (EAJ/PNV)	72,602	22.30	+1.93	6	±0
Basque Solidarity (EA)	54,426	16.72	–1.27	4	–1
Socialist Party of the Basque Country–Basque Country Left (PSE–EE (PSOE))^{1}	53,320	16.38	–11.45	4	–3
People's Party (PP)	38,677	11.88	+5.46	3	+2
United Left (IU/EB)	23,042	7.08	+6.07	2	+2
Alavese Unity (UA)	839	0.26	+0.22	0	±0
Coalition for a New Socialist Party (NPS)^{2}	375	0.12	+0.08	0	±0
Blank ballots	7,001	2.15	+1.29		
Total	325,576			25	±0
Valid votes	325,576	99.45	–0.14		
Invalid votes	1,790	0.55	+0.14		
Votes cast / turnout	327,366	58.13	–3.94		
Abstentions	235,841	41.87	+3.94		
Registered voters	563,207				
Sources
Footnotes: ^{1} Socialist Party of the Basque Country–Basque Country Left results are compared to the combined totals of the Socialist Party of the Basque Country and Basque Country Left in the 1990 election.; ^{2} Coalition for a New Socialist Party results are compared to Alliance for the Republic totals in the 1990 election.

=== 1990 ===
Summary of the 28 October 1990 Basque Parliament election results in Guipúzcoa
Parties and alliances	Popular vote			Seats	
Parties and alliances	Votes	%	±pp	Total	+/−
Popular Unity (HB)	79,224	23.58	+1.97	6	±0
Basque Nationalist Party (EAJ/PNV)	68,457	20.37	+4.39	6	+2
Socialist Party of the Basque Country (PSE–PSOE)	63,922	19.02	–0.92	5	–1
Basque Solidarity (EA)	60,449	17.99	–5.14	5	–1
Basque Country Left (EE)	29,596	8.81	–3.05	2	–1
People's Party (PP)^{1}	21,556	6.42	+2.85	1	+1
United Left (IU/EB)	3,380	1.01	+0.67	0	±0
Basque Country Greens (EHB)	1,242	0.37	New	0	±0
The Ecologist Greens (LVE)	1,181	0.35	New	0	±0
Democratic and Social Centre (CDS)	1,175	0.35	–2.04	0	±0
Ruiz-Mateos Group–European Democratic Alliance (ARM–ADE)	1,020	0.30	New	0	±0
Workers' Socialist Party (PST)	667	0.20	+0.08	0	±0
Socialist Democracy (DS)	496	0.15	New	0	±0
Humanist Party (PH)	254	0.08	±0.00	0	±0
Revolutionary Communist League–Communist Movement (LKI–EMK)	230	0.07	New	0	±0
Alliance for the Republic (AxR)^{2}	144	0.04	–0.05	0	±0
Alavese Unity (UA)	134	0.04	New	0	±0
Blank ballots	2,891	0.86	+0.48		
Total	336,018			25	±0
Valid votes	336,018	99.59	+0.31		
Invalid votes	1,367	0.41	–0.31		
Votes cast / turnout	337,385	62.07	–7.06		
Abstentions	206,204	37.93	+7.06		
Registered voters	543,589				
Sources
Footnotes: ^{1} People's Party results are compared to People's Alliance–Liberal Party totals in the 1986 election.; ^{2} Alliance for the Republic results are compared to Internationalist Socialist Workers' Party totals in the 1986 election.

=== 1986 ===
Summary of the 30 November 1986 Basque Parliament election results in Guipúzcoa
Parties and alliances	Popular vote			Seats	
Parties and alliances	Votes	%	±pp	Total	+/−
Basque Solidarity (EA)	85,905	23.13	New	6	+6
Popular Unity (HB)	80,255	21.61	+2.88	6	+1
Socialist Party of the Basque Country (PSE–PSOE)	74,040	19.94	–2.11	6	±0
Basque Nationalist Party (EAJ/PNV)	59,339	15.98	–24.81	4	–7
Basque Country Left (EE)	44,030	11.86	+2.97	3	+1
People's Alliance–Liberal Party (AP–PL)^{1}	13,258	3.57	–3.19	0	–1
Democratic and Social Centre (CDS)	8,863	2.39	New	0	±0
Communist Party of the Basque Country (PCE/EPK)	1,391	0.37	–0.55	0	±0
United Left (IU/EB)	1,266	0.34	New	0	±0
Republican Popular Unity (UPR)^{2}	562	0.15	+0.08	0	±0
Workers' Socialist Party (PST)	457	0.12	New	0	±0
Internationalist Socialist Workers' Party (POSI)	325	0.09	New	0	±0
Humanist Party (PH)	307	0.08	New	0	±0
Blank ballots^{3}	1,406	0.38	–0.01		
Total	371,404			25	±0
Valid votes	371,404	99.28	–0.16		
Invalid votes	2,676	0.72	+0.16		
Votes cast / turnout	374,080	69.13	–0.24		
Abstentions	167,030	30.87	+0.24		
Registered voters	541,110				
Sources
Footnotes: ^{1} People's Alliance–Liberal Party results are compared to People's Coalition totals in the 1984 election.; ^{2} Republican Popular Unity results are compared to Communist Party of Spain (Marxist–Leninist) totals in the 1984 election.; ^{3} The 1983 electoral law provided that blank ballots would not count as valid votes for the application of the 5 percent threshold in each district. However, this rule was not determinant in excluding any party from seat distribution during its time of application (the 1984 and 1986 elections). As a result, and for comparison purposes, blank ballots are shown here included within valid votes.

=== 1984 ===
Summary of the 26 February 1984 Basque Parliament election results in Guipúzcoa
Parties and alliances	Popular vote			Seats	
Parties and alliances	Votes	%	±pp	Total	+/−
Basque Nationalist Party (EAJ/PNV)	144,684	40.79	+3.53	11	+2
Socialist Party of the Basque Country (PSE–PSOE)	78,208	22.05	+8.29	6	+3
Popular Unity (HB)	66,443	18.73	+1.15	5	+1
Basque Country Left (EE)	31,538	8.89	–4.56	2	–1
People's Coalition (AP–PDP–UL)^{1}	23,994	6.76	+4.09	1	+1
Neighborhood Labor (Auzolan)^{2}	4,989	1.41	–0.80	0	±0
Communist Party of the Basque Country (PCE/EPK)	3,247	0.92	–2.10	0	±0
Communist Party of Spain (Marxist–Leninist) (PCE (m–l))	252	0.07	New	0	±0
Union of the Democratic Centre (UCD)	—N/a		–7.56	0	–1
Blank ballots^{3}	1,387	0.39	+0.12		
Total	354,742			25	+5
Valid votes	354,742	99.44	+0.30		
Invalid votes	2,001	0.56	–0.30		
Votes cast / turnout	356,743	69.37	+11.40		
Abstentions	157,488	30.63	–11.40		
Registered voters	514,231				
Sources
Footnotes: ^{1} People's Coalition results are compared to People's Alliance totals in the 1980 election.; ^{2} Auzolan results are compared to the combined totals of Communist Movement of the Basque Country and Revolutionary Communist League in the 1980 election.; ^{3} The 1983 electoral law provided that blank ballots would not count as valid votes for the application of the 5 percent threshold in each district. However, this rule was not determinant in excluding any party from seat distribution during its time of application (the 1984 and 1986 elections). As a result, and for comparison purposes, blank ballots are shown here included within valid votes.

=== 1980 ===
Summary of the 9 March 1980 Basque Parliament election results in Guipúzcoa
Parties and alliances	Popular vote			Seats	
Parties and alliances	Votes	%	±pp	Total	+/−
Basque Nationalist Party (EAJ/PNV)	111,411	37.26	n/a	9	n/a
People's Unity (HB)	52,559	17.58	n/a	4	n/a
Socialist Party of the Basque Country (PSE–PSOE)	41,148	13.76	n/a	3	n/a
Basque Country Left (EE)	40,210	13.45	n/a	3	n/a
Union of the Democratic Centre (UCD)	22,598	7.56	n/a	1	n/a
Communist Party of the Basque Country (PCE/EPK)	9,017	3.02	n/a	0	n/a
People's Alliance (AP)	7,975	2.67	n/a	0	n/a
Communist Movement of the Basque Country (EMK/MCE)	4,508	1.51	n/a	0	n/a
Basque Socialists' Unity Force (ESEI)	3,571	1.19	n/a	0	n/a
Revolutionary Communist League (LKI/LCR)	2,092	0.70	n/a	0	n/a
Workers' Party of the Basque Country (ORT–PTE)	1,318	0.44	n/a	0	n/a
Carlist Party (EKA/PC)	1,289	0.43	n/a	0	n/a
Communist Unity (UC)	546	0.18	n/a	0	n/a
Blank ballots	797	0.27	n/a		
Total	299,039			20	n/a
Valid votes	299,039	99.14	n/a		
Invalid votes	2,579	0.86	n/a		
Votes cast / turnout	301,618	57.97	n/a		
Abstentions	218,698	42.03	n/a		
Registered voters	520,316				
