= Álava (Basque Parliament constituency) =

Coordinates: 42°50′N 2°45′W

- Basque Parliament; Electoral constituency
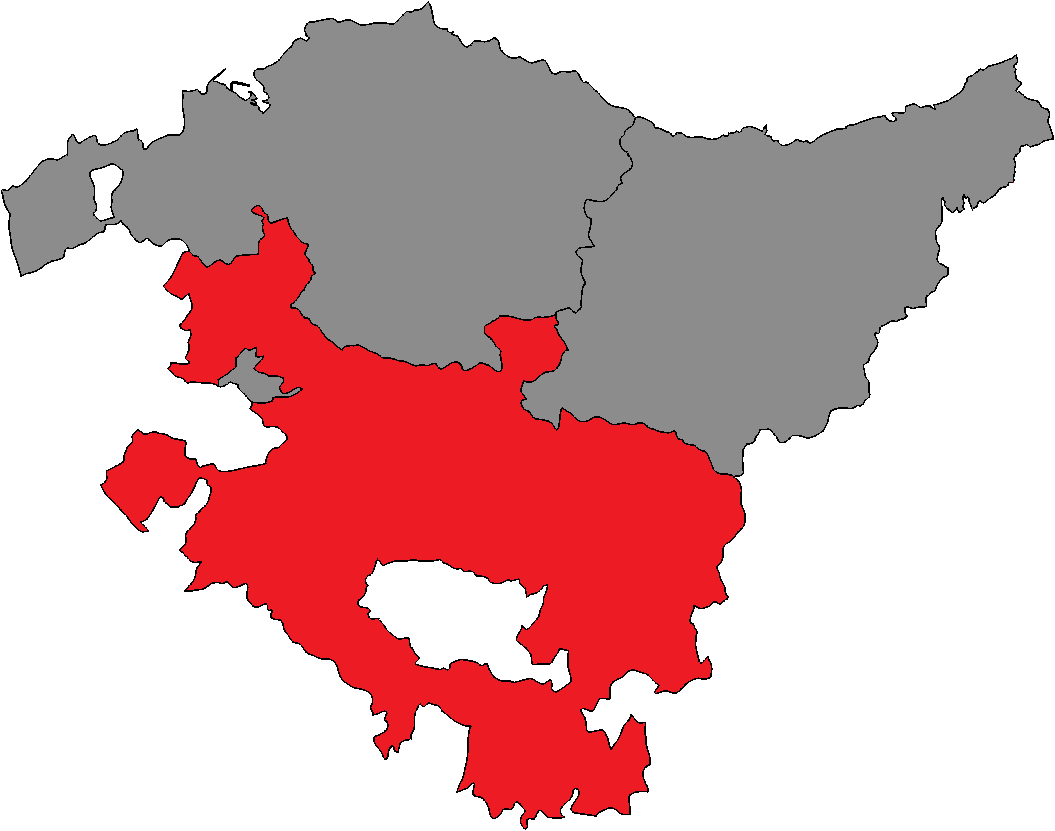
- Location of Álava within the Basque Country
- Province: Álava
- Autonomous community: Basque Country
- Population: ▲339,137 (2024)
- Electorate: ▲261,623 (2024)
- Major settlements: Vitoria-Gasteiz

Current constituency
- Created: 1980
- Seats: 20 (1980–1984); 25 (1984–present)
- Members: EH Bildu (8); PNV (7); PSE–EE (4); PP (4); Sumar (1); Vox (1)

Álava (Basque: Araba) is one of the three constituencies (Spanish: circunscripciones) represented in the Basque Parliament, the regional legislature of the Basque Autonomous Community. The constituency currently elects 25 deputies. Its boundaries correspond to those of the Spanish province of Álava. The electoral system uses the D'Hondt method and closed-list proportional representation, with a minimum threshold of three percent.

== Electoral system ==
The constituency was created as per the Statute of Autonomy for the Basque Country of 1979 and was first contested in the 1980 regional election. The Statute provided for the three provinces in the Basque Country—Álava, Biscay and Gipuzkoa—to be established as multi-member districts in the Basque Parliament, with this regulation being maintained under the 1983 and 1990 regional electoral laws. Each constituency is allocated a fixed number of 25 seats each, to provide for an equal representation of the three provinces in Parliament as required under the regional Statute. The exception was the 1980 election, when this number was 60.

Voting is on the basis of universal suffrage, which comprises all nationals over eighteen, registered in the Basque Country and in full enjoyment of their political rights. Amendments to the electoral law in 2011 required for Basques abroad to apply for voting before being permitted to vote, a system known as "begged" or expat vote (Spanish: Voto rogado) which was abolished in 2022. Seats are elected using the D'Hondt method and a closed list proportional representation, with an electoral threshold of three percent of valid votes—which, until 1983 and from 1990 includes blank ballots; also and until a 2000 reform, the threshold was set at five percent—being applied in each constituency. The use of the D'Hondt method may result in a higher effective threshold, depending on the district magnitude.

The electoral law allows for parties and federations registered in the interior ministry, coalitions and groupings of electors to present lists of candidates. Parties and federations intending to form a coalition ahead of an election are required to inform the relevant Electoral Commission within ten days of the election call—fifteen before 1985—whereas groupings of electors need to secure the signature of at least one percent of the electorate in the constituencies for which they seek election—one-thousandth of the electorate, with a compulsory minimum of 500 signatures, until 1983; and only the signature of 500 electors from 1983 to 1990—disallowing electors from signing for more than one list of candidates.

== Deputies ==
Deputies 1980–present
Key to parties HB EH EHAK EH Bildu (Note: From 2023.) EH Bildu (Note: Until 2023.) IU/EB EB–B Elkarrekin Podemos Sumar Aralar EE PSE/PSE–EE EA PNV/PNV–EA UPyD CDS UCD PP+Cs PP CP AP/AP–PL UA Vox
Parliament	Election	Distribution
1st	1980	3 / 2 / 3 / 7 / 4 / 1
2nd	1984	3 / 2 / 7 / 9 / 4
3rd	1986	3 / 3 / 7 / 4 / 5 / 2 / 1
4th	1990	3 / 2 / 6 / 2 / 6 / 3 / 3
5th	1994	2 / 2 / 4 / 2 / 6 / 4 / 5
6th	1998	3 / 1 / 5 / 1 / 6 / 7 / 2
7th	2001	1 / 1 / 5 / 9 / 9
8th	2005	2 / 1 / 7 / 8 / 7
9th	2009	1 / 9 / 8 / 1 / 6
10th	2012	6 / 6 / 7 / 1 / 5
11th	2016	5 / 4 / 3 / 8 / 5
12th	2020	6 / 2 / 4 / 9 / 3 / 1
13th	2024	8 / 1 / 4 / 7 / 4 / 1

== Regional elections ==
=== 2024 ===
Summary of the 21 April 2024 Basque Parliament election results in Álava
Parties and alliances	Popular vote			Seats	
Parties and alliances	Votes	%	±pp	Total	+/−
Basque Country Gather (EH Bildu)	44,815	29.15	+4.51	8	+2
Basque Nationalist Party (EAJ/PNV)	41,111	26.74	–5.18	7	–2
Socialist Party of the Basque Country–Basque Country Left (PSE–EE (PSOE))	24,911	16.20	+0.70	4	±0
People's Party (PP)^{1}	24,429	15.89	+4.49	4	+1
Vox (Vox)	5,656	3.68	–0.09	1	±0
Unite (Sumar)^{2}	5,630	3.66	n/a	1	±0
United We Can–Green Alliance (Podemos/Ahal Dugu–AV)^{2}	3,681	2.39	n/a	0	–1
Animalist Party with the Environment (PACMA)^{3}	974	0.63	+0.04	0	±0
Blank Seats to Leave Empty Seats (EB/AZ)	691	0.45	+0.07	0	±0
For a Fairer World (PUM+J)	301	0.20	–0.02	0	±0
Welcome (OE)	187	0.12	+0.07	0	±0
Blank ballots	1,369	0.88	–0.03		
Total	153,755			25	±0
Valid votes	153,755	98.95	–0.03		
Invalid votes	1,624	1.05	+0.03		
Votes cast / turnout	155,379	59.39	+10.39		
Abstentions	106,244	40.61	–10.39		
Registered voters	261,623				
Sources
Footnotes: ^{1} People's Party results are compared to People's Party+Citizens totals in the 2020 election.; ^{2} Within the United We Can–United Left alliance in the 2020 election.; ^{3} Animalist Party with the Environment results are compared to Animalist Party Against Mistreatment of Animals totals in the 2020 election.

=== 2020 ===
Summary of the 12 July 2020 Basque Parliament election results in Álava
Parties and alliances	Popular vote			Seats	
Parties and alliances	Votes	%	±pp	Total	+/−
Basque Nationalist Party (EAJ/PNV)	40,067	31.92	+3.91	9	+1
Basque Country Gather (EH Bildu)	30,934	24.64	+6.84	6	+1
Socialist Party of the Basque Country–Basque Country Left (PSE–EE (PSOE))	19,452	15.50	+2.60	4	+1
People's Party+Citizens (PP+Cs)^{1}	14,316	11.40	–10.22	3	–2
United We Can–United Left (Podemos/Ahal Dugu, Ezker Anitza–IU)	10,092	8.04	–8.07	2	–2
Vox (Vox)	4,734	3.77	+3.26	1	+1
Equo Greens–Greens of the Basque Country (Equo Berdeak–Verdes)	2,746	2.19	New	0	±0
Animalist Party Against Mistreatment of Animals (PACMA/ATTKAA)	741	0.59	–0.40	0	±0
Blank Seats (EB/AZ)	475	0.38	+0.13	0	±0
For a Fairer World (PUM+J)	282	0.22	New	0	±0
Zero Cuts–The Greens–Municipalists (Recortes Cero–LV–M)	266	0.21	–0.23	0	±0
Free for the Basque Country (LxE/EaL)	169	0.13	New	0	±0
Welcome (Ongi Etorri)	64	0.05	–0.03	0	±0
Foralist League (LFF)	51	0.04	New	0	±0
Blank ballots	1,142	0.91	+0.20		
Total	125,531			25	±0
Valid votes	125,531	98.98	–0.29		
Invalid votes	1,300	1.02	+0.29		
Votes cast / turnout	126,831	49.00	–10.74		
Abstentions	132,015	51.00	+10.74		
Registered voters	258,846				
Sources
Footnotes: ^{1} People's Party+Citizens results are compared to the combined totals of People's Party and Citizens–Party of the Citizenry in the 2016 election.

=== 2016 ===
Summary of the 25 September 2016 Basque Parliament election results in Álava
Parties and alliances	Popular vote			Seats	
Parties and alliances	Votes	%	±pp	Total	+/−
Basque Nationalist Party (EAJ/PNV)	42,327	28.01	+2.50	8	+1
People's Party (PP)	27,877	18.45	–0.23	5	±0
Basque Country Gather (EH Bildu)	26,899	17.80	–3.94	5	–1
United We Can (Podemos, Ezker Anitza–IU, Equo)^{1}	24,339	16.11	+10.47	4	+4
Socialist Party of the Basque Country–Basque Country Left (PSE–EE (PSOE))	19,489	12.90	–6.13	3	–3
Citizens–Party of the Citizenry (C's)	4,784	3.17	New	0	±0
Animalist Party Against Mistreatment of Animals (PACMA/ATTKAA)	1,498	0.99	+0.56	0	±0
Let's Win the Basque Country: Yes We Can (Ganemos Irabazi)	856	0.57	New	0	±0
Vox (Vox)	771	0.51	New	0	±0
Zero Cuts–Green Group (Recortes Cero–GV)	664	0.44	New	0	±0
Blank Seats (EB/AZ)	385	0.25	–1.22	0	±0
Welcome (Ongi Etorri)	124	0.08	+0.02	0	±0
Union, Progress and Democracy (UPyD)	n/a	n/a	–3.47	0	–1
Blank ballots	1,078	0.71	–0.73		
Total	151,091			25	±0
Valid votes	151,091	99.27	–0.74		
Invalid votes	1,113	0.73	+0.74		
Votes cast / turnout	152,204	59.74	–3.85		
Abstentions	102,557	40.26	+3.85		
Registered voters	254,761				
Sources
Footnotes: ^{1} United We Can results are compared to the combined totals of United Left–The Greens: Plural Left and Equo Greens–Basque Ecologists in the 2012 election.

=== 2012 ===
Summary of the 21 October 2012 Basque Parliament election results in Álava
Parties and alliances	Popular vote			Seats	
Parties and alliances	Votes	%	±pp	Total	+/−
Basque Nationalist Party (EAJ/PNV)	40,116	25.51	–4.51	7	–1
Basque Country Gather (EH Bildu)^{1}	34,193	21.74	+13.94	6	+5
Socialist Party of the Basque Country–Basque Country Left (PSE–EE (PSOE))	30,358	19.30	–11.87	6	–3
People's Party (PP)	29,374	18.68	–2.43	5	–1
Union, Progress and Democracy (UPyD)	5,453	3.47	–0.46	1	±0
United Left–The Greens: Plural Left (IU–LV)	4,579	2.91	New	0	±0
Equo Greens–Basque Ecologists (Equo)^{2}	4,287	2.73	+1.91	0	±0
United Left–Greens (EB–B)	2,488	1.58	–1.73	0	±0
Blank Seats (EB/AZ)	2,309	1.47	New	0	±0
Animalist Party Against Mistreatment of Animals (PACMA/ATTKAA)	669	0.43	New	0	±0
For a Fairer World (PUM+J)	638	0.41	–0.11	0	±0
Humanist Party (PH)	223	0.14	New	0	±0
Communist Unification of Spain (UCE)	154	0.10	New	0	±0
Welcome (Ongi Etorri)	101	0.06	New	0	±0
Community Integration Party (PYC)	59	0.04	New	0	±0
Blank ballots	2,270	1.44	+0.26		
Total	157,271			25	±0
Valid votes	157,271	98.53	+4.14		
Invalid votes	2,348	1.47	–4.14		
Votes cast / turnout	159,619	63.59	–1.48		
Abstentions	91,375	36.41	+1.48		
Registered voters	250,994				
Sources
Footnotes: ^{1} Basque Country Gather results are compared to the combined totals of Aralar and Basque Solidarity in the 2009 election.; ^{2} Equo Greens–Basque Ecologists results are compared to The Greens totals in the 2009 election.

=== 2009 ===
Summary of the 1 March 2009 Basque Parliament election results in Álava
Parties and alliances	Popular vote			Seats	
Parties and alliances	Votes	%	±pp	Total	+/−
Socialist Party of the Basque Country–Basque Country Left (PSE–EE (PSOE))	47,523	31.17	+5.87	9	+2
Basque Nationalist Party (EAJ/PNV)^{1}	45,767	30.02	n/a	8	+2
People's Party (PP)	32,188	21.11	–4.64	6	–1
Aralar (Aralar)	6,613	4.34	+2.85	1	+1
Union, Progress and Democracy (UPyD)	5,990	3.93	New	1	+1
Basque Solidarity (EA)^{1}	5,280	3.46	n/a	0	–2
United Left–Greens (EB–B)	5,053	3.31	–1.61	0	–1
The Greens (B/LV)	1,246	0.82	New	0	±0
For a Fairer World (PUM+J)	792	0.52	New	0	±0
Internationalist Socialist Workers' Party (POSI)	209	0.14	±0.00	0	±0
Communist Party of the Basque Homelands (PCTV/EHAK)	n/a	n/a	–13.16	0	–2
Blank ballots	1,797	1.18	+0.43		
Total	152,458			25	±0
Valid votes	152,458	94.39	–5.21		
Invalid votes	9,060	5.61	+5.21		
Votes cast / turnout	161,518	65.07	–4.18		
Abstentions	86,713	34.93	+4.18		
Registered voters	248,231				
Sources
Footnotes: ^{1} Within the Basque Nationalist Party–Basque Solidarity alliance in the 2005 election.

=== 2005 ===
Summary of the 17 April 2005 Basque Parliament election results in Álava
Parties and alliances	Popular vote			Seats	
Parties and alliances	Votes	%	±pp	Total	+/−
Basque Nationalist Party–Basque Solidarity (PNV–EA)	51,986	30.44	–3.11	8	–1
People's Party (PP)	43,989	25.75	–6.72	7	–2
Socialist Party of the Basque Country–Basque Country Left (PSE–EE (PSOE))	43,216	25.30	+4.87	7	+2
Communist Party of the Basque Homelands (PCTV/EHAK)^{1}	14,187	13.16	+7.03	2	+1
United Left–Greens (EB–B)^{2}	8,409	4.92	–1.00	1	±0
Alavese Unity (UA)	3,765	2.20	New	0	±0
Aralar (Aralar)	2,542	1.49	New	0	±0
Greens–Anti-Bullfighting Party Against Mistreatment of Animals (B–PACMA)	851	0.50	New	0	±0
Humanist Party (PH)	340	0.20	–0.37	0	±0
Internationalist Socialist Workers' Party (POSI)	234	0.14	New	0	±0
Blank ballots	1,284	0.75	–0.13		
Total	170,803			25	±0
Valid votes	170,803	99.60	+0.15		
Invalid votes	689	0.40	–0.15		
Votes cast / turnout	171,492	69.25	–9.79		
Abstentions	76,153	30.75	+9.79		
Registered voters	247,645				
Sources
Footnotes: ^{1} Communist Party of the Basque Homelands results are compared to Basque Citizens totals in the 2001 election.; ^{2} United Left–Greens results are compared to United Left totals in the 2001 election.

=== 2001 ===
Summary of the 13 May 2001 Basque Parliament election results in Álava
Parties and alliances	Popular vote			Seats	
Parties and alliances	Votes	%	±pp	Total	+/−
Basque Nationalist Party–Basque Solidarity (PNV–EA)^{1}	64,832	33.55	+5.62	9	+2
People's Party (PP)^{1}	62,737	32.47	–2.58	9	±0
Socialist Party of the Basque Country–Basque Country Left (PSE–EE (PSOE))	39,469	20.43	+3.62	5	±0
Basque Citizens (EH)	11,836	6.13	–5.93	1	–2
United Left (IU/EB)	11,430	5.92	+0.29	1	±0
Humanist Party (PH)	1,095	0.57	+0.34	0	±0
Freedom (Askatasuna)	137	0.07	New	0	±0
Blank ballots	1,694	0.88	–0.48		
Total	193,230			25	±0
Valid votes	193,230	99.45	+0.04		
Invalid votes	1,070	0.55	–0.04		
Votes cast / turnout	194,300	79.04	+8.77		
Abstentions	51,503	20.96	–8.77		
Registered voters	245,830				
Sources
Footnotes: ^{1} Basque Nationalist Party–Basque Solidarity results are compared to the combined totals of Basque Nationalist Party and Basque Solidarity in the 1998 election.; ^{2} People's Party results are compared to the combined totals of the People's Party and Alavese Unity in the 1998 election.

=== 1998 ===
Summary of the 25 October 1998 Basque Parliament election results in Álava
Parties and alliances	Popular vote			Seats	
Parties and alliances	Votes	%	±pp	Total	+/−
People's Party (PP)	45,470	26.66	+10.74	7	+3
Basque Nationalist Party (EAJ/PNV)	36,923	21.65	–0.10	6	±0
Socialist Party of the Basque Country–Basque Country Left (PSE–EE (PSOE))	28,670	16.81	+1.22	5	+1
Basque Citizens (EH)^{1}	20,567	12.06	+1.98	3	+1
Alavese Unity (UA)	14,305	8.39	–10.13	2	–3
Basque Solidarity (EA)	10,718	6.28	–0.96	1	–1
United Left (IU/EB)	9,606	5.63	–3.45	1	–1
Basque Country Greens (EHB)	864	0.51	New	0	±0
Natural Law Party (PLN/LNA)	750	0.44	New	0	±0
Humanist Party (PH)	387	0.23	New	0	±0
Blank ballots	2,315	1.36	–0.25		
Total	170,575			25	±0
Valid votes	170,575	99.41	+0.06		
Invalid votes	1,005	0.59	–0.06		
Votes cast / turnout	171,580	70.27	+9.58		
Abstentions	72,604	29.73	–9.58		
Registered voters	244,184				
Sources
Footnotes: ^{1} Basque Citizens results are compared to Popular Unity totals in the 1994 election.

=== 1994 ===
Summary of the 23 October 1994 Basque Parliament election results in Álava
Parties and alliances	Popular vote			Seats	
Parties and alliances	Votes	%	±pp	Total	+/−
Basque Nationalist Party (EAJ/PNV)	29,911	21.75	–0.56	6	±0
Alavese Unity (UA)	25,469	18.52	+7.47	5	+2
People's Party (PP)	21,885	15.92	+5.09	4	+1
Socialist Party of the Basque Country–Basque Country Left (PSE–EE (PSOE))^{1}	21,431	15.59	–12.29	4	–4
Popular Unity (HB)	13,865	10.08	–2.62	2	–1
United Left (IU/EB)	12,484	9.08	+7.94	2	+2
Basque Solidarity (EA)	9,958	7.24	–0.89	2	±0
Coalition for a New Socialist Party (NPS)^{2}	283	0.21	+0.07	0	±0
Blank ballots	2,214	1.61	+0.81		
Total	137,500			25	±0
Valid votes	137,500	99.35	+0.03		
Invalid votes	898	0.65	–0.03		
Votes cast / turnout	138,398	60.69	+0.45		
Abstentions	89,633	39.31	–0.45		
Registered voters	228,031				
Sources
Footnotes: ^{1} Socialist Party of the Basque Country–Basque Country Left results are compared to the combined totals of the Socialist Party of the Basque Country and Basque Country Left in the 1990 election.; ^{2} Coalition for a New Socialist Party results are compared to Alliance for the Republic totals in the 1990 election.

=== 1990 ===
Summary of the 28 October 1990 Basque Parliament election results in Álava
Parties and alliances	Popular vote			Seats	
Parties and alliances	Votes	%	±pp	Total	+/−
Basque Nationalist Party (EAJ/PNV)	28,341	22.31	+2.22	6	+1
Socialist Party of the Basque Country (PSE–PSOE)	26,894	21.17	–3.71	6	–1
Popular Unity (HB)	16,139	12.70	–0.10	3	±0
Alavese Unity (UA)	14,034	11.05	New	3	+3
People's Party (PP)^{1}	13,758	10.83	+3.98	3	+2
Basque Solidarity (EA)	10,332	8.13	–6.41	2	–2
Basque Country Left (EE)	8,526	6.71	–4.21	2	–1
Democratic and Social Centre (CDS)	2,436	1.92	–6.08	0	–2
United Left (IU/EB)	1,451	1.14	+0.83	0	±0
Ruiz-Mateos Group–European Democratic Alliance (ARM–ADE)	1,213	0.95	New	0	±0
Socialist Democracy (DS)	803	0.63	New	0	±0
The Ecologist Greens (LVE)	676	0.53	New	0	±0
Basque Country Greens (EHB)	542	0.43	New	0	±0
Workers' Socialist Party (PST)	465	0.37	+0.03	0	±0
Alliance for the Republic (AxR)^{2}	178	0.14	+0.01	0	±0
Humanist Party (PH)	130	0.10	–0.07	0	±0
Revolutionary Communist League–Communist Movement (LKI–EMK)	114	0.09	New	0	±0
Blank ballots	1,010	0.80	+0.23		
Total	127,042			25	±0
Valid votes	127,042	99.32	–0.05		
Invalid votes	868	0.68	+0.05		
Votes cast / turnout	127,910	60.24	–10.04		
Abstentions	84,441	39.76	+10.04		
Registered voters	212,351				
Sources
Footnotes: ^{1} People's Party results are compared to People's Alliance–Liberal Party totals in the 1986 election.; ^{2} Alliance for the Republic results are compared to Internationalist Socialist Workers' Party totals in the 1986 election.

=== 1986 ===
Summary of the 30 November 1986 Basque Parliament election results in Álava
Parties and alliances	Popular vote			Seats	
Parties and alliances	Votes	%	±pp	Total	+/−
Socialist Party of the Basque Country (PSE–PSOE)	34,806	24.88	–0.18	7	±0
Basque Nationalist Party (EAJ/PNV)	28,103	20.09	–15.40	5	–4
Basque Solidarity (EA)	20,349	14.54	New	4	+4
Popular Unity (HB)	17,912	12.80	+2.02	3	±0
Basque Country Left (EE)	15,277	10.92	+3.25	3	+1
Democratic and Social Centre (CDS)	11,195	8.00	New	2	+2
People's Alliance–Liberal Party (AP–PL)^{1}	9,584	6.85	–9.37	1	–3
Workers' Socialist Party (PST)	474	0.34	New	0	±0
United Left (IU/EB)	429	0.31	New	0	±0
Communist Party of the Basque Country (PCE/EPK)	389	0.28	–0.62	0	±0
Humanist Party (PH)	237	0.17	New	0	±0
Internationalist Socialist Workers' Party (POSI)	182	0.13	New	0	±0
Republican Popular Unity (UPR)	126	0.09	New	0	±0
Blank ballots^{2}	799	0.57	–0.23		
Total	139,905			25	±0
Valid votes	139,905	99.37	+0.17		
Invalid votes	892	0.63	–0.17		
Votes cast / turnout	140,797	70.28	+3.09		
Abstentions	59,551	29.72	–3.09		
Registered voters	200,348				
Sources
Footnotes: ^{1} People's Alliance–Liberal Party results are compared to People's Coalition totals in the 1984 election.; ^{2} The 1983 electoral law provided that blank ballots would not count as valid votes for the application of the 5 percent threshold in each district. However, this rule was not determinant in excluding any party from seat distribution during its time of application (the 1984 and 1986 elections). As a result, and for comparison purposes, blank ballots are shown here included within valid votes.

=== 1984 ===
Summary of the 26 February 1984 Basque Parliament election results in Álava
Parties and alliances	Popular vote			Seats	
Parties and alliances	Votes	%	±pp	Total	+/−
Basque Nationalist Party (EAJ/PNV)	44,583	35.49	+5.43	9	+2
Socialist Party of the Basque Country (PSE–PSOE)	31,485	25.06	+11.10	7	+4
People's Coalition (AP–PDP–UL)^{1}	20,380	16.22	+10.49	4	+3
Popular Unity (HB)	13,539	10.78	–3.28	3	±0
Basque Country Left (EE)	9,633	7.67	–1.51	2	±0
Left Socialist Candidacy (CSI)	2,507	2.00	New	0	±0
Neighborhood Labor (Auzolan)^{2}	1,368	1.09	–0.09	0	±0
Communist Party of the Basque Country (PCE/EPK)	1,127	0.90	–2.11	0	±0
Union of the Democratic Centre (UCD)	n/a	n/a	–19.68	0	–4
Blank ballots^{3}	1,001	0.80	+0.22		
Total	125,623			25	+5
Valid votes	125,623	99.20	+0.12		
Invalid votes	1,011	0.80	–0.12		
Votes cast / turnout	126,634	67.19	+8.12		
Abstentions	61,832	32.81	–8.12		
Registered voters	188,466				
Sources
Footnotes: ^{1} People's Coalition results are compared to People's Alliance totals in the 1980 election.; ^{2} Auzolan results are compared to the combined totals of Communist Movement of the Basque Country and Revolutionary Communist League in the 1980 election.; ^{3} The 1983 electoral law provided that blank ballots would not count as valid votes for the application of the 5 percent threshold in each district. However, this rule was not determinant in excluding any party from seat distribution during its time of application (the 1984 and 1986 elections). As a result, and for comparison purposes, blank ballots are shown here included within valid votes.

=== 1980 ===
Summary of the 9 March 1980 Basque Parliament election results in Álava
Parties and alliances	Popular vote			Seats	
Parties and alliances	Votes	%	±pp	Total	+/−
Basque Nationalist Party (EAJ/PNV)	31,640	30.06	n/a	7	n/a
Union of the Democratic Centre (UCD)	20,716	19.68	n/a	4	n/a
People's Unity (HB)	14,804	14.06	n/a	3	n/a
Socialist Party of the Basque Country (PSE–PSOE)	14,694	13.96	n/a	3	n/a
Basque Country Left (EE)	9,658	9.18	n/a	2	n/a
People's Alliance (AP)	6,029	5.73	n/a	1	n/a
Communist Party of the Basque Country (PCE/EPK)	3,168	3.01	n/a	0	n/a
Basque Socialists' Unity Force (ESEI)	1,366	1.30	n/a	0	n/a
Communist Movement of the Basque Country (EMK/MCE)	797	0.76	n/a	0	n/a
Workers' Party of the Basque Country (ORT–PTE)	726	0.69	n/a	0	n/a
Carlist Party (EKA/PC)	461	0.44	n/a	0	n/a
Revolutionary Communist League (LKI/LCR)	438	0.42	n/a	0	n/a
Communist Unity (UC)	158	0.15	n/a	0	n/a
Blank ballots	609	0.58	n/a		
Total	105,264			20	n/a
Valid votes	105,264	99.08	n/a		
Invalid votes	975	0.92	n/a		
Votes cast / turnout	106,239	59.07	n/a		
Abstentions	73,605	40.93	n/a		
Registered voters	179,844				
