= 1990 Basque regional election =

Election in the Spanish region of the Basque Country

- 28 October 1990

All 75 seats in the Basque Parliament 38 seats needed for a majority
- Opinion polls
- Registered: 1,687,936 ▲1.7%
- Turnout: 1,029,457 (61.0%) ▼8.6 pp
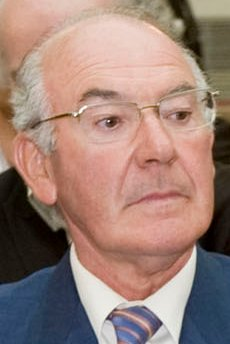

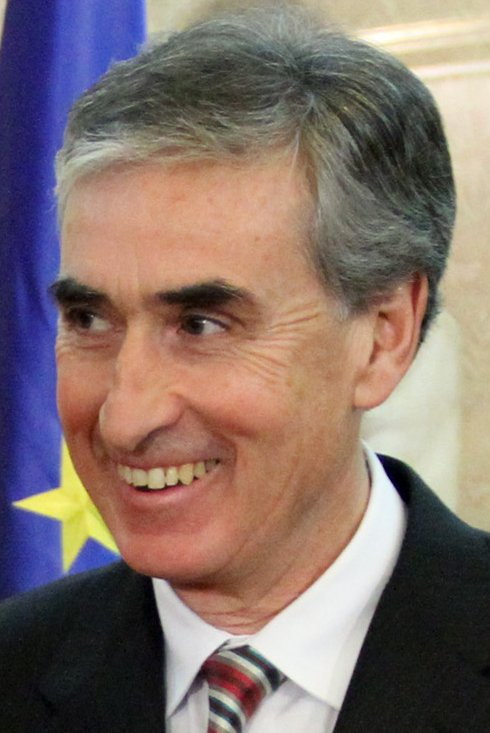

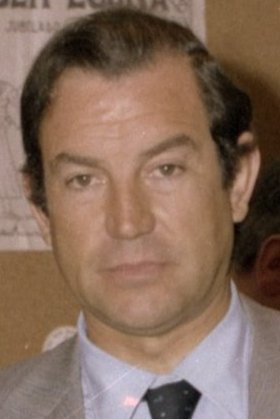

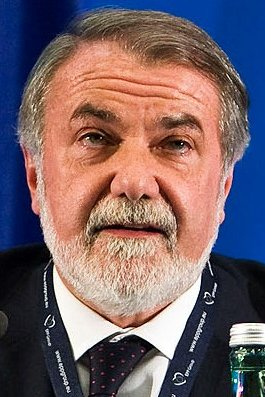

	First party	Second party	Third party
Leader	José Antonio Ardanza	Ramón Jáuregui	Iñaki Esnaola
Party	EAJ/PNV	PSE–PSOE	HB
Leader since	2 March 1985	16 June 1988	1986
Leader's seat	Guipúzcoa	Guipúzcoa	Guipúzcoa
Last election	17 seats, 23.6%	19 seats, 22.0%	13 seats, 17.4%
Seats won	22	16	13
Seat change	▲5	▼3	0
Popular vote	289,701	202,736	186,410
Percentage	28.3%	19.8%	18.2%
Swing	▲4.7 pp	▼2.2 pp	▲0.8 pp
	Fourth party	Fifth party	Sixth party
Leader	Carlos Garaikoetxea	Jaime Mayor Oreja	Kepa Aulestia
Party	EA	PP	EE
Leader since	4 September 1986	20 January 1989	1987
Leader's seat	Guipúzcoa	Álava	Biscay
Last election	13 seats, 15.8%	2 seats, 4.8% (Note: Results for AP–PL in the 1986 election.)	9 seats, 10.8%
Seats won	9	6	6
Seat change	▼4	▲4	▼3
Popular vote	115,703	83,719	79,105
Percentage	11.3%	8.2%	7.7%
Swing	▼4.5 pp	▲3.4 pp	▼3.1 pp
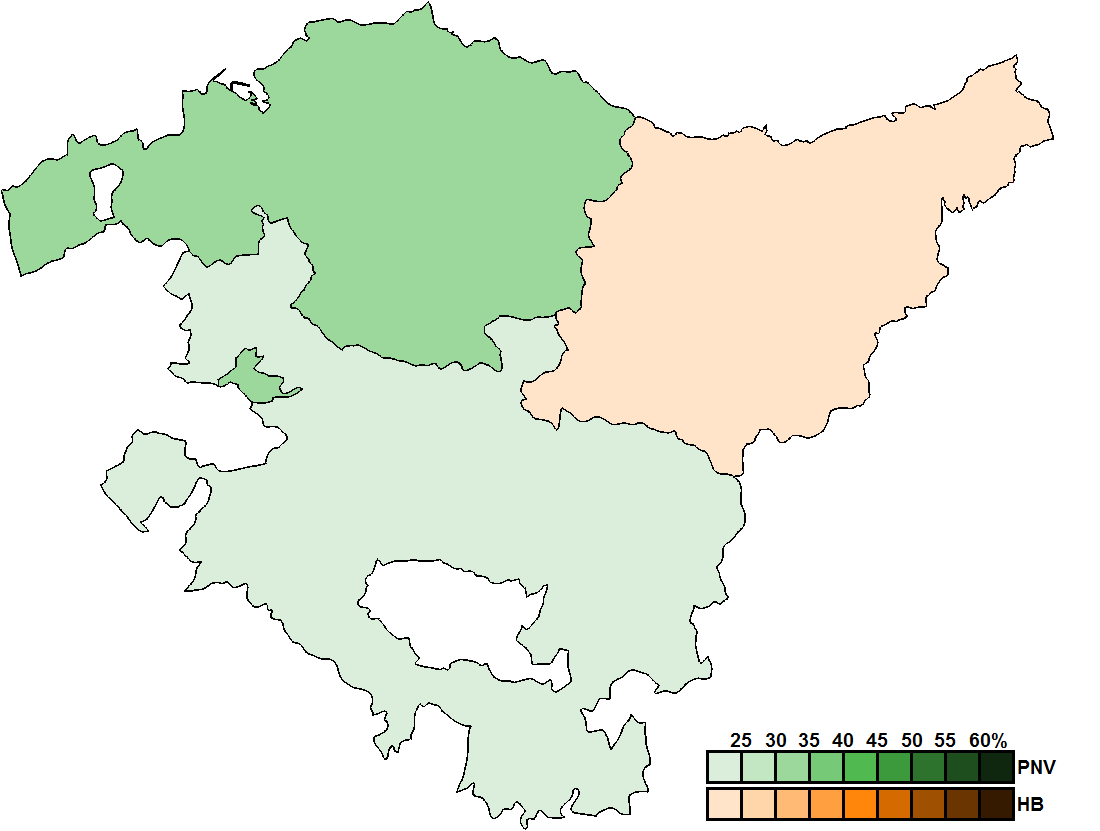
Lehendakari before election
José Antonio Ardanza
EAJ/PNV
Lehendakari after election
José Antonio Ardanza
EAJ/PNV

A regional election was held in the Basque Country on 28 October 1990 to elect the 4th Parliament of the autonomous community. All 75 seats in the Parliament were up for election.

The Basque Nationalist Party (EAJ/PNV) won 22 seats, the Socialist Party of the Basque Country (PSE–PSOE) came second with 16 seats, Popular Unity (HB) came third with 13 seats and Basque Solidarity (EA) won 9 seats. The People's Party (PP) and Basque Country Left (EE) each won 6 seats.

== Overview ==
Under the 1979 Statute of Autonomy, the Basque Parliament was the unicameral legislature of the Basque Autonomous Community, having legislative power in devolved matters, as well as the ability to grant or withdraw confidence from a lehendakari. The electoral and procedural rules were supplemented by national law provisions.

=== Date ===
The term of the Basque Parliament expired four years after the date of its previous election, unless it was dissolved earlier. The election decree was required to be issued no later than 25 days before the scheduled expiration date of parliament and published on the following day in the Official Gazette of the Basque Country (BOPV), with election day taking place between 54 and 60 days after the decree's publication. The previous election was held on 30 November 1986, which meant that the chamber's term would have expired on 30 November 1990. The election decree was required to be published in the BOPV no later than 6 November 1990, setting the latest possible date for election day on 5 January 1991.

The lehendakari had the prerogative to dissolve the Basque Parliament at any given time and call a snap election, provided that no motion of no confidence was in process. In the event of an investiture process failing to elect a lehendakari within a 60-day period from the Parliament's reconvening, the chamber was to be automatically dissolved and a fresh election called.

The Basque Parliament was officially dissolved on 3 September 1990 with the publication of the corresponding decree in the BOPV, setting election day for 28 October.

=== Electoral system ===
Voting for the Parliament was based on universal suffrage, comprising all Spanish nationals over 18 years of age, registered in the Basque Country and with full political rights, provided that they had not been deprived of the right to vote by a final sentence, nor were legally incapacitated.

The Basque Parliament had 75 seats. All were elected in three multi-member constituencies—corresponding to the provinces of Álava, Biscay and Guipúzcoa, each of which was assigned a fixed number of 25 seats to provide for an equal parliamentary representation of the three provinces—using the D'Hondt method and closed-list proportional voting, with a five percent-threshold of valid votes (including blank ballots) (Note: As per amendments introduced by the 1990 electoral law.) in each constituency.

The law did not provide for by-elections to fill vacant seats; instead, any vacancies arising after the proclamation of candidates and during the legislative term were filled by the next candidates on the party lists or, when required, by designated substitutes.

== Opinion polls ==
The tables below list opinion polling results in reverse chronological order, showing the most recent first and using the dates when the survey fieldwork was done, as opposed to the date of publication. Where the fieldwork dates are unknown, the date of publication is given instead. The highest percentage figure in each polling survey is displayed with its background shaded in the leading party's colour. If a tie ensues, this is applied to the figures with the highest percentages. The "Lead" column on the right shows the percentage-point difference between the parties with the highest percentages in a poll.

=== Voting intention estimates ===
The table below lists weighted voting intention estimates. Refusals are generally excluded from the party vote percentages, while question wording and the treatment of "don't know" responses and those not intending to vote may vary between polling organisations. When available, seat projections determined by the polling organisations are displayed below (or in place of) the percentages in a smaller font; 38 seats were required for an absolute majority in the Basque Parliament.

Polling firm/Commissioner	Fieldwork date	Sample size	Turnout	PNV	PSE–EE (PSOE)	HB	EA	EE	AP	CDS	PP	UA	Lead
1990 regional election	28 Oct 1990	—N/a	61.0	28.3; 22	19.8; 16	18.2; 13	11.3; 9	7.7; 6	(Note: Within PP.)	0.7; 0	8.2; 6	1.4; 3	8.5
Demoscopia/El País	21 Oct 1990	?	?	27.6; 21/23	20.8; 17/20	17.4; 12/14	10.6; 7/9	8.2; 7		2.8; 0	9.7; 6/8	0.3; 0	6.8
Opina/La Vanguardia	13–16 Oct 1990	2,500	?	28.5; 23/25	18.5; 15/17	18.0; 14/15	11.5; 8/9	11.5; 8/10		1.0; 0	5.5; 3/5	? 0/1	10.0
Metra Seis/El Independiente	14 Oct 1990	?	?	? 22/23	? 15/16	? 12/13	? 10/11	? 8/9		? 0	6.6; 5/6	–	?
Bergareche/Vocento	14 Oct 1990	?	?	? 20/21	? 15	? 13	? 9	? 8/9		? 0/1	? 8/9	–	?
Sigma Dos/El Mundo	14 Oct 1990	?	?	26.0; 19/22	? 17/19	? 13	? 9/10	? 8		? 0	? 6	–	?
Demoscopia/El País	27 Sep–3 Oct 1990	1,800	65	26.0; 19/21	20.0; 18	18.0; 13/14	12.0; 9/10	10.0; 7/9		? 0	8.0; 6/7	–	6.0
Bergareche/Vocento	1 Oct 1990	?	?	? 19/21	? 14/15	? 13	? 9	? 8		? 0/1	? 8/9	–	?
Basque Government	13–16 Dec 1989	?	?	? 20	? 18	? 13	? 8	? 7		? 0	? 9	–	?
1989 general election	29 Oct 1989	—N/a	66.9	22.8 (17)	21.1 (18)	16.9 (13)	11.2 (9)	8.8 (7)		3.5 (2)	9.4 (9)	–	1.7
1989 EP election	15 Jun 1989	—N/a	58.5	21.0 (16)	18.2 (17)	19.1 (16)	13.0 (11)	9.8 (8)		2.7 (1)	7.6 (6)	–	1.9
1987 foral elections	10 Jun 1987	—N/a	67.4	21.8 (16)	18.9 (16)	19.2 (15)	17.6 (15)	9.9 (7)	6.2 (4)	3.4 (2)	–	–	2.6
1987 EP election	10 Jun 1987	—N/a	67.3	19.4 (14)	19.1 (17)	19.6 (16)	16.1 (13)	9.7 (7)	7.2 (6)	3.9 (2)	–	–	0.2
1986 regional election	30 Nov 1986	—N/a	69.6	23.6; 17	22.0; 19	17.4; 13	15.8; 13	10.8; 9	4.8; 2	3.5; 2	–	–	1.6

=== Voting preferences ===
The table below lists raw, unweighted voting preferences.

Polling firm/Commissioner	Fieldwork date	Sample size	PNV	PSE–EE (PSOE)	HB	EA	EE	AP	CDS	PP	UA	Question	X mark	Lead
1990 regional election (Note: Does not include non-resident citizens.)	28 Oct 1990	—N/a	17.2	12.0	11.0	6.9	4.7		0.4	5.0	0.9	—N/a	38.9	5.2
1989 general election	29 Oct 1989	—N/a	15.1	14.0	11.2	7.4	5.8		2.3	6.2	–	—N/a	33.0	1.1
1989 EP election	15 Jun 1989	—N/a	12.2	10.6	11.1	7.6	5.7		1.6	4.4	–	—N/a	41.4	1.1
1987 foral elections	10 Jun 1987	—N/a	14.6	12.6	12.8	11.8	6.6	4.1	2.3	–	–	—N/a	32.6	1.8
1987 EP election	10 Jun 1987	—N/a	12.9	12.7	13.1	10.7	6.5	4.8	2.6	–	–	—N/a	32.6	0.2
1986 regional election	30 Nov 1986	—N/a	16.3	15.2	12.0	10.9	7.5	3.3	2.9	–	–	—N/a	30.4	1.1

== Results ==
=== Overall ===
← Summary of the 28 October 1990 Basque Parliament election results →
Parties and alliances	Popular vote			Seats	
Parties and alliances	Votes	%	±pp	Total	+/−
Basque Nationalist Party (EAJ/PNV)	289,701	28.28	+4.68	22	+5
Socialist Party of the Basque Country (PSE–PSOE)	202,736	19.79	−2.16	16	−3
Popular Unity (HB)	186,410	18.20	+0.80	13	±0
Basque Solidarity (EA)	115,703	11.30	−4.47	9	−4
People's Party (PP)^{1}	83,719	8.17	+3.33	6	+4
Basque Country Left (EE)	79,105	7.72	−3.11	6	−3
United Left (IU/EB)	14,440	1.41	+0.82	0	±0
Alavese Unity (UA)	14,351	1.40	New	3	+3
Democratic and Social Centre (CDS)	6,680	0.65	−2.87	0	−2
Socialist Democracy (DS)	5,023	0.49	New	0	±0
The Ecologist Greens (LVE)	4,304	0.42	New	0	±0
Ruiz-Mateos Group–European Democratic Alliance (ARM–ADE)	4,303	0.42	New	0	±0
Basque Country Greens (EHB)	4,199	0.41	New	0	±0
Workers' Socialist Party (PST)	3,010	0.29	+0.04	0	±0
Humanist Party (PH)	825	0.08	−0.04	0	±0
Revolutionary Communist League–Communist Movement (LKI–EMK)	670	0.07	New	0	±0
Alliance for the Republic (AxR)^{2}	669	0.07	−0.03	0	±0
Communist Party of the Basque Country People (PCPE/EHAC)	599	0.06	New	0	±0
Communist Party of Spain (Marxist–Leninist) (PCE (m–l))^{3}	272	0.03	−0.07	0	±0
Blank ballots	7,580	0.74	+0.30		
Total	1,024,299			75	±0
Valid votes	1,024,299	99.50	+0.09		
Invalid votes	5,158	0.50	−0.09		
Votes cast / turnout	1,029,457	60.99	−8.63		
Abstentions	658,479	39.01	+8.63		
Registered voters	1,687,936				
Sources
Footnotes: ^{1} People's Party results are compared to People's Alliance–Liberal Party totals in the 1986 election.; ^{2} Alliance for the Republic results are compared to Internationalist Socialist Workers' Party totals in the 1986 election.; ^{3} Communist Party of Spain (Marxist–Leninist) results are compared to Republican Popular Unity totals in the 1986 election.

Popular vote
EAJ/PNV	28.28%
PSE–PSOE	19.79%
HB	18.20%
EA	11.30%
PP	8.17%
EE	7.72%
IU/EB	1.41%
UA	1.40%
Others	2.98%
Blank ballots	0.74%

Seats
EAJ/PNV	29.33%
PSE–PSOE	21.33%
HB	17.33%
EA	12.00%
PP	8.00%
EE	8.00%
UA	4.00%

=== Distribution by constituency ===
Constituency	PNV		PSE		HB		EA		PP		EE		UA	
Constituency	%	S	%	S	%	S	%	S	%	S	%	S	%	S
Álava	22.3	6	21.2	6	12.7	3	8.1	2	10.8	3	6.7	2	11.1	3
Biscay	34.4	10	19.9	5	16.2	4	8.0	2	8.6	2	7.3	2	0.0	–
Guipúzcoa	20.4	6	19.0	5	23.6	6	18.0	5	6.4	1	8.8	2	0.0	–
Total	28.2	22	19.8	16	18.2	13	11.3	9	8.2	6	7.7	6	1.4	3

== Aftermath ==
=== Government formation ===
Investiture
Ballot →	31 January 1991		1 February 1991	
Required majority →	38 out of 75		Simple	
José Antonio Ardanza (PNV): • PNV (22); • EA (9); • EE (6)	37 / 75	X mark	37 / 75	check
Abstentions/Blank ballots: • PSE (16); • PP (6); • UA (3)	25 / 75		25 / 75	
Absentees: • HB (13)	13 / 75		13 / 75	

== Bibliography ==
- Ley Orgánica 3/1979, de 18 de diciembre, de Estatuto de Autonomía para el País Vasco (Organic Law 3/1979). Official State Gazette (in Spanish). 18 December 1979 [version as of 22 December 1979]. BOE-A-1979-30177.
- Ley 7/1981, de 30 de junio, sobre Ley de Gobierno (Law 7/1981). Official State Gazette (in Spanish). 30 June 1981 [version as of 23 November 1988]. BOE-A-2012-5927.
- Ley Orgánica 5/1985, de 19 de junio, del Régimen Electoral General (Organic Law 5/1985). Official State Gazette (in Spanish). 19 June 1985 [version as of 3 April 1987]. BOE-A-1985-11672.
- Ley 5/1990, de 15 de junio, de Elecciones al Parlamento Vasco (Law 5/1990). Official State Gazette (in Spanish). 15 June 1990 [version as of 6 July 1990]. BOE-A-2012-2859.
- Decreto 227/1990, de 1 de septiembre por el que se disuelve el Parlamento Vasco y se convocan elecciones (PDF) (Decree 14/1998). Official Gazette of the Basque Country (in Spanish). 1 September 1990.
