= 1994 Basque regional election =

Election in the Spanish region of the Basque Country

- 23 October 1994

All 75 seats in the Basque Parliament 38 seats needed for a majority
- Opinion polls
- Registered: 1,749,250 ▲3.6%
- Turnout: 1,044,085 (59.7%) ▼1.3 pp
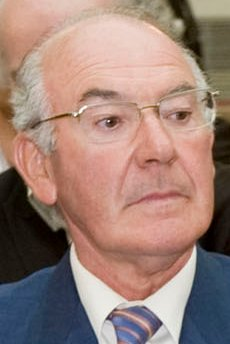

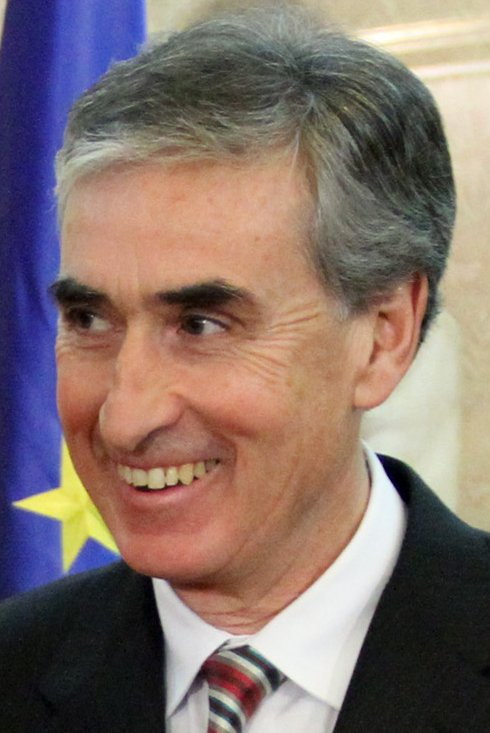

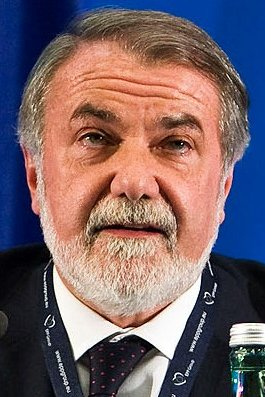

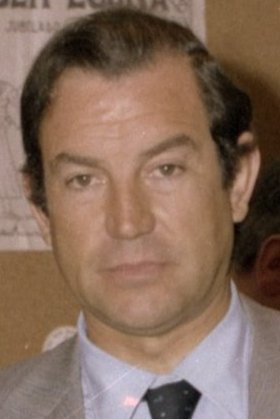

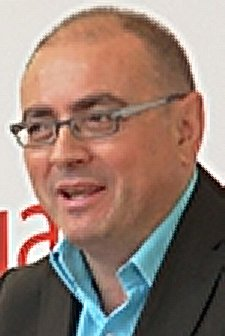
	First party	Second party	Third party
Leader	José Antonio Ardanza	Ramón Jáuregui	Karmelo Landa
Party	EAJ/PNV	PSE–EE (PSOE)	HB
Leader since	2 March 1985	16 June 1988	1994
Leader's seat	Guipúzcoa	Guipúzcoa	Biscay
Last election	22 seats, 28.3%	22 seats, 27.5% (Note: Results for PSE–PSOE (19.8%, 16 seats) and EE (7.7%, 6 seats) in the 1990 election.)	13 seats, 18.2%
Seats won	22	12	11
Seat change	0	▼10	▼2
Popular vote	304,346	174,682	166,147
Percentage	29.3%	16.8%	16.0%
Swing	▲1.0 pp	▼10.7 pp	▼2.2 pp
	Fourth party	Fifth party	Sixth party
Leader	Jaime Mayor Oreja	Carlos Garaikoetxea	Javier Madrazo
Party	PP	EA	IU/EB
Leader since	20 January 1989	4 September 1986	14 May 1994
Leader's seat	Álava	Guipúzcoa	Biscay
Last election	6 seats, 8.2%	9 seats, 11.3%	0 seats, 1.4%
Seats won	11	8	6
Seat change	▲5	▼1	▲6
Popular vote	146,960	105,136	93,291
Percentage	14.2%	10.1%	9.0%
Swing	▲6.0 pp	▼1.2 pp	▲7.6 pp
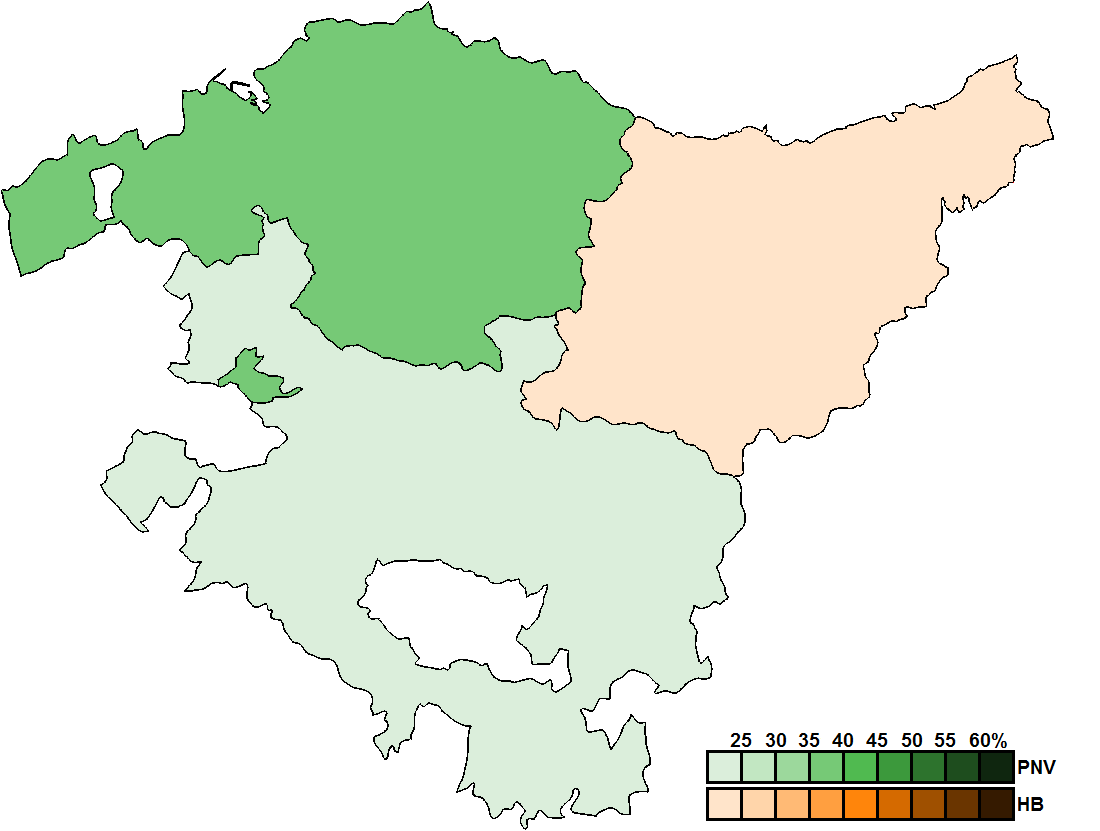
Lehendakari before election
José Antonio Ardanza
EAJ/PNV
Lehendakari after election
José Antonio Ardanza
EAJ/PNV

A regional election was held in the Basque Country on 23 October 1994 to elect the 5th Parliament of the autonomous community. All 75 seats in the Parliament were up for election.

The Basque Nationalist Party (EAJ/PNV) won 22 seats, the Socialist Party of the Basque Country (PSE–PSOE) came second with 12 seats, People's Unity (HB) and the People's Party (PP) both won 11 seats each. Basque Solidarity (EA) won 8 seats.

This was also the first election to the Basque parliament that the Socialist Party and the Basque Country Left (EE) party contested together as a unified party.

== Overview ==
Under the 1979 Statute of Autonomy, the Basque Parliament was the unicameral legislature of the Basque Autonomous Community, having legislative power in devolved matters, as well as the ability to grant or withdraw confidence from a lehendakari. The electoral and procedural rules were supplemented by national law provisions.

=== Date ===
The term of the Basque Parliament expired four years after the date of its previous election, unless it was dissolved earlier. The election decree was required to be issued no later than 25 days before the scheduled expiration date of parliament and published on the following day in the Official Gazette of the Basque Country (BOPV), with election day taking place between 54 and 60 days after the decree's publication. The previous election was held on 28 October 1990, which meant that the chamber's term would have expired on 28 October 1994. The election decree was required to be published in the BOPV no later than 4 October 1994, setting the latest possible date for election day on 3 December 1994.

The lehendakari had the prerogative to dissolve the Basque Parliament at any given time and call a snap election, provided that no motion of no confidence was in process. In the event of an investiture process failing to elect a lehendakari within a 60-day period from the Parliament's reconvening, the chamber was to be automatically dissolved and a fresh election called.

The Basque Parliament was officially dissolved on 30 August 1994 with the publication of the corresponding decree in the BOPV, setting election day for 23 October.

=== Electoral system ===
Voting for the Parliament was based on universal suffrage, comprising all Spanish nationals over 18 years of age, registered in the Basque Country and with full political rights, provided that they had not been deprived of the right to vote by a final sentence, nor were legally incapacitated.

The Basque Parliament had 75 seats. All were elected in three multi-member constituencies—corresponding to the provinces of Álava, Biscay and Guipúzcoa, each of which was assigned a fixed number of 25 seats to provide for an equal parliamentary representation of the three provinces—using the D'Hondt method and closed-list proportional voting, with a five percent-threshold of valid votes (including blank ballots) in each constituency.

The law did not provide for by-elections to fill vacant seats; instead, any vacancies arising after the proclamation of candidates and during the legislative term were filled by the next candidates on the party lists or, when required, by designated substitutes.

== Parties and candidates ==
The electoral law allowed for parties and federations registered in the interior ministry, alliances and groupings of electors to present lists of candidates. Parties and federations intending to form an alliance were required to inform the relevant electoral commission within 10 days of the election call, whereas groupings of electors needed to secure the signature of at least one percent of the electorate in the constituencies for which they sought election, disallowing electors from signing for more than one list.

Below is a list of the main parties and alliances which contested the election:

Candidacy	Parties and alliances	Leading candidate	Ideology	Previous result		Gov.	Ref.
Candidacy	Parties and alliances	Leading candidate	Ideology	Vote %	Seats	Gov.	Ref.
EAJ/PNV	List: Basque Nationalist Party (EAJ/PNV)	José Antonio Ardanza	Basque nationalism Christian democracy Conservative liberalism	28.3%	22	Yes	
PSE–EE (PSOE)	List: Socialist Party of the Basque Country–Basque Country Left (PSE–EE (PSOE))	Ramón Jáuregui	Social democracy	27.5%	22	Yes	
HB	List: Popular Unity (HB) – Basque Nationalist Action (EAE/ANV)	Karmelo Landa	Basque independence Abertzale left Revolutionary socialism	18.2%	13	No	
EA	List: Eusko Alkartasuna (EA)	Carlos Garaikoetxea	Basque nationalism Social democracy	11.3%	9	No	
PP	List: People's Party (PP)	Jaime Mayor Oreja	Conservatism; Christian democracy	8.2%	6	No	
UA	List: Alavese Unity (UA)	Enriqueta Benito	Alavese regionalism Christian democracy	1.4%	3	No	
IU/EB	List: United Left (IU/EB)	Javier Madrazo	Socialism; Communism	1.4%	0	No	

== Opinion polls ==
The tables below list opinion polling results in reverse chronological order, showing the most recent first and using the dates when the survey fieldwork was done, as opposed to the date of publication. Where the fieldwork dates are unknown, the date of publication is given instead. The highest percentage figure in each polling survey is displayed with its background shaded in the leading party's colour. If a tie ensues, this is applied to the figures with the highest percentages. The "Lead" column on the right shows the percentage-point difference between the parties with the highest percentages in a poll.

=== Voting intention estimates ===
The table below lists weighted voting intention estimates. Refusals are generally excluded from the party vote percentages, while question wording and the treatment of "don't know" responses and those not intending to vote may vary between polling organisations. When available, seat projections determined by the polling organisations are displayed below (or in place of) the percentages in a smaller font; 38 seats were required for an absolute majority in the Basque Parliament.

Polling firm/Commissioner	Fieldwork date	Sample size	Turnout	PNV	PSE–EE (PSOE)	HB	EA	PP	EE	IU/EB	UA	Lead
1994 regional election	23 Oct 1994	—N/a	59.7	29.3; 22	16.8; 12	16.0; 11	10.1; 8	14.2; 11	(Note: Within PSE–EE (PSOE).)	9.0; 6	2.7; 5	12.5
Demoscopia/El País	16 Oct 1994	?	60	33.3; 24/25	16.9; 12/14	15.7; 12	9.9; 6	13.3; 10/11		7.6; 5	2.1; 4	16.4
Sigma Dos/El Mundo	16 Oct 1994	?	?	30.0; 22/23	17.7; 13/15	14.8; 11	9.5; 7	14.7; 12		8.2; 6/7	1.3; 2/3	12.3
Bergareche/El Correo	16 Oct 1994	?	?	? 22	? 13	? 11	? 6	? 11		? 8	? 4	?
ICP Research/Diario 16	16 Oct 1994	?	?	33.0; 23/24	18.0; 14/16	16.0; 10/11	9.0; 7/8	14.0; 10/12		8.0; 5	2.0; 3	15.0
Ikerfel/PSE–EE	10–13 Oct 1994	1,700	?	? 22	? 16/17	? 10/11	? 7	? 9		? 6	? 4	?
CIS (Note: "Preelectoral País Vasco 1994 (Estudio nº 2116. Octubre 1994)". CIS (in Spanish). 13 October 1994. Archived from the original on 4 May 2020.)	7–13 Oct 1994	1,495	60.5	36.1	16.1	15.4	10.3	12.1		6.9	1.3	20.0
Deia	12 Oct 1994	?	?	? 23	? 15	–	–	? 11		–	–	?
Basque Government	1–10 Oct 1994	?	?	? 23/24	? 12/14	? 11/13	? 6/8	? 9/10		? 5/7	? 4	?
Opina/La Vanguardia	29 Sep–1 Oct 1994	2,000	?	32.5; 24/25	16.5; 14/15	12.5; 11/12	8.0; 5/6	12.0; 11		7.0; 5/6	2.5; 2/3	16.0
Basque Government	27 Sep 1994	?	?	? 24	? 15	? 11	? 7	? 10		? 5	? 3	?
CIS (Note: "Situación y perspectivas electorales País Vasco (Estudio nº 2114. Septiembre 1994)". CIS (in Spanish). 20 September 1994. Archived from the original on 4 May 2020.)	13–20 Sep 1994	1,490	64.7	37.4	17.4	16.3	9.9	9.7		7.0	1.4	20.0
Demoscopia/PP	6–12 Jul 1994	2,400	63	32.8; 24/25	16.3; 13	15.0; 11/12	8.4; 5/6	12.4; 9/11		9.4; 6	1.6; 3	16.5
1994 EP election	12 Jun 1994	—N/a	52.3	25.9 (19)	18.3 (16)	15.6 (11)	8.7 (6)	17.5 (16)		9.6 (7)	–	7.6
Bergareche/El Correo	16 Apr 1994	?	?	26.9	20.1	15.9	–	15.8		–	–	6.5
CIS	28 Mar 1994	?	?	? 17/18	? 20/22	? 10	? 8	? 12/14		? 1/2	? 4/5	?
Basque Government	10–15 Jan 1994	?	?	28.7; 22	19.2; 16	17.0; 12	11.5; 9	9.5; 9		1.6; 2	1.5; 4	9.5
PNV	9 Jan 1994	?	?	? 17	? 21	? 13	? 7	? 12		? 2	? 3	?
1993 general election	6 Jun 1993	—N/a	69.7	24.1 (18)	24.5 (20)	14.6 (11)	9.8 (7)	14.7 (12)		6.3 (4)	1.4 (3)	0.4
1991 foral elections	26 May 1991	—N/a	59.0	29.6 (23)	19.7 (16)	17.4 (13)	12.4 (10)	8.0 (5)	6.9 (3)	1.8 (0)	2.2 (5)	9.9
1990 regional election	28 Oct 1990	—N/a	61.0	28.3; 22	19.8; 16	18.2; 13	11.3; 9	8.2; 6	7.7; 6	1.4; 0	1.4; 3	8.5

=== Voting preferences ===
The table below lists raw, unweighted voting preferences.

Polling firm/Commissioner	Fieldwork date	Sample size	PNV	PSE–EE (PSOE)	HB	EA	PP	EE	IU/EB	UA	Question	X mark	Lead
1994 regional election (Note: Does not include non-resident citizens.)	23 Oct 1994	—N/a	17.3	9.9	9.5	6.0	8.3		5.3	1.6	—N/a	40.1	7.4
CIS	7–13 Oct 1994	1,495	19.3	5.4	8.4	4.7	3.2		3.7	0.3	37.2	15.1	10.9
CIS	13–20 Sep 1994	1,490	23.2	8.0	8.3	4.0	2.3		4.2	0.5	35.0	12.3	14.9
1994 EP election	12 Jun 1994	—N/a	13.5	9.5	8.1	4.5	9.1		5.0	–	—N/a	47.5	4.0
CIS	24 Apr–13 May 1994	1,579	22.1	6.0	7.2	3.1	3.1		2.8	0.2	33.3	18.4	14.9
1993 general election	6 Jun 1993	—N/a	16.7	17.0	10.2	6.9	10.2		4.4	1.0	—N/a	30.0	0.3
CIS	7–17 Nov 1992	1,615	18.3	7.6	9.5	3.9	1.6	2.5	2.3	0.8	33.6	19.0	8.8
1991 foral elections	26 May 1991	—N/a	17.3	11.5	10.2	7.3	4.7	4.0	1.1	1.3	—N/a	41.0	5.8
1990 regional election	28 Oct 1990	—N/a	17.2	12.0	11.0	6.9	5.0	4.7	0.9	0.9	—N/a	38.9	5.2

=== Victory preferences ===
The table below lists opinion polling on the victory preferences for each party in the event of a regional election taking place.

Polling firm/Commissioner	Fieldwork date	Sample size	PNV	PSE–EE (PSOE)	HB	EA	PP	IU/EB	UA	Other/ None	Question	Lead
CIS	13–20 Sep 1994	1,490	26.4	7.9	8.4	4.3	2.3	4.3	0.4	3.0	43.0	18.0

=== Victory likelihood ===
The table below lists opinion polling on the perceived likelihood of victory for each party in the event of a regional election taking place.

Polling firm/Commissioner	Fieldwork date	Sample size	PNV	PSE–EE (PSOE)	HB	EA	PP	IU/EB	UA	Other/ None	Question	Lead
CIS	7–13 Oct 1994	1,495	67.7	4.0	0.6	0.3	1.8	0.1	0.1	0.0	25.4	63.7
CIS	13–20 Sep 1994	1,490	61.8	4.5	1.2	0.3	1.1	0.6	0.0	0.1	30.3	57.3

== Results ==
=== Overall ===
← Summary of the 23 October 1994 Basque Parliament election results →
Parties and alliances	Popular vote			Seats	
Parties and alliances	Votes	%	±pp	Total	+/−
Basque Nationalist Party (EAJ/PNV)	304,346	29.32	+1.04	22	±0
Socialist Party of the Basque Country–Basque Country Left (PSE–EE (PSOE))^{1}	174,682	16.83	−10.68	12	−10
Popular Unity (HB)	166,147	16.01	−2.19	11	−2
People's Party (PP)	146,960	14.16	+5.99	11	+5
Basque Solidarity (EA)	105,136	10.13	−1.17	8	−1
United Left (IU/EB)	93,291	8.99	+7.58	6	+6
Alavese Unity (UA)	27,797	2.68	+1.28	5	+2
Coalition for a New Socialist Party (NPS)^{2}	1,462	0.14	+0.07	0	±0
Blank ballots	18,080	1.74	+1.00		
Total	1,037,901			75	±0
Valid votes	1,037,901	99.41	−0.09		
Invalid votes	6,184	0.59	+0.09		
Votes cast / turnout	1,044,085	59.69	−1.30		
Abstentions	705,165	40.31	+1.30		
Registered voters	1,749,250				
Sources
Footnotes: ^{1} Socialist Party of the Basque Country–Basque Country Left results are compared to the combined totals of the Socialist Party of the Basque Country and Basque Country Left in the 1990 election.; ^{2} Coalition for a New Socialist Party results are compared to Alliance for the Republic totals in the 1990 election.

Popular vote
EAJ/PNV	29.32%
PSE–EE (PSOE)	16.83%
HB	16.01%
PP	14.16%
EA	10.13%
IU/EB	8.99%
UA	2.68%
CNPS	0.14%
Blank ballots	1.74%

Seats
EAJ/PNV	29.33%
PSE–EE (PSOE)	16.00%
HB	14.67%
PP	14.67%
EA	10.66%
IU/EB	8.00%
UA	6.67%

=== Distribution by constituency ===
Constituency	PNV		PSE–EE		HB		PP		EA		IU/EB		UA	
Constituency	%	S	%	S	%	S	%	S	%	S	%	S	%	S
Álava	21.8	6	15.6	4	10.1	2	15.9	4	7.2	2	9.1	2	18.5	5
Biscay	35.1	10	17.4	4	13.4	3	15.0	4	7.1	2	10.0	2	0.3	–
Guipúzcoa	22.3	6	16.4	4	23.1	6	11.9	3	16.7	4	7.1	2	0.3	–
Total	29.3	22	16.8	12	16.0	11	14.2	11	10.1	8	9.0	6	2.7	5

== Aftermath ==
=== Government formation ===
Investiture
Ballot →	29 December 1994	
Required majority →	38 out of 75	
José Antonio Ardanza (PNV): • PNV (22); • PSE–EE (12); • EA (8)	42 / 75	check
Abstentions/Blank ballots: • PP (11); • IU/EB (6); • UA (5)	22 / 75	
Absentees: • HB (11)	11 / 75	

== Bibliography ==
- Ley Orgánica 3/1979, de 18 de diciembre, de Estatuto de Autonomía para el País Vasco (Organic Law 3/1979). Official State Gazette (in Spanish). 18 December 1979 [version as of 22 December 1979]. BOE-A-1979-30177.
- Ley 7/1981, de 30 de junio, sobre Ley de Gobierno (Law 7/1981). Official State Gazette (in Spanish). 30 June 1981 [version as of 23 November 1988]. BOE-A-2012-5927.
- Ley Orgánica 5/1985, de 19 de junio, del Régimen Electoral General (Organic Law 5/1985). Official State Gazette (in Spanish). 19 June 1985 [version as of 31 March 1994]. BOE-A-1985-11672.
- Ley 5/1990, de 15 de junio, de Elecciones al Parlamento Vasco (Law 5/1990). Official State Gazette (in Spanish). 15 June 1990 [version as of 6 July 1990]. BOE-A-2012-2859.
- Decreto 346/1994, de 29 de agosto, por el que se disuelve el Parlamento Vasco y se convocan elecciones (PDF) (Decree 346/1994). Official Gazette of the Basque Country (in Spanish). 29 August 1994.
