= 1998 Basque regional election =

Election in the Spanish region of the Basque Country

- 25 October 1998

All 75 seats in the Basque Parliament 38 seats needed for a majority
- Opinion polls
- Registered: 1,821,608 ▲4.1%
- Turnout: 1,275,008 (70.0%) ▲10.3 pp
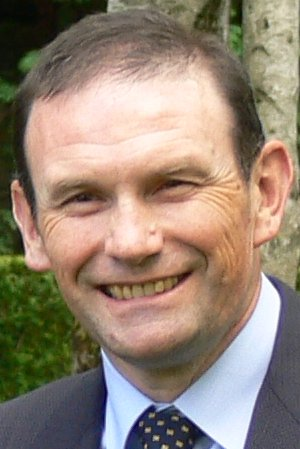

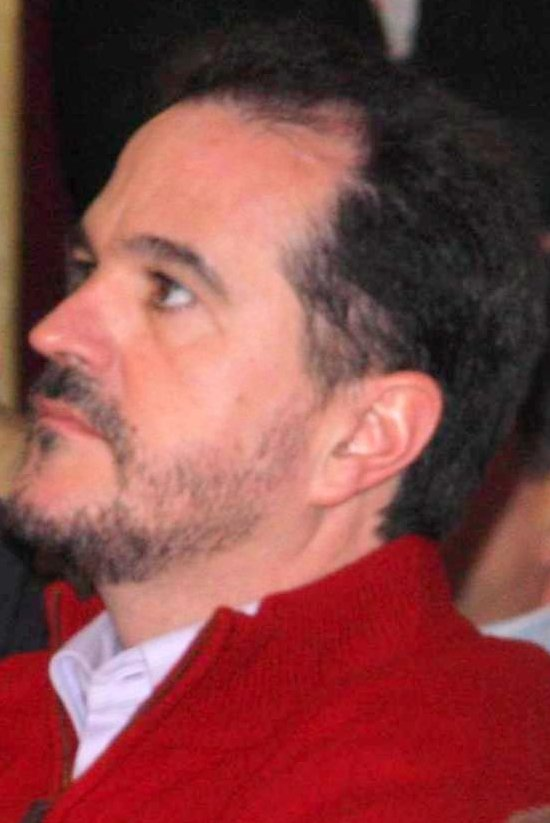

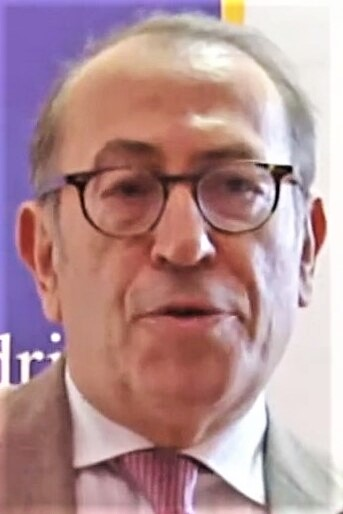

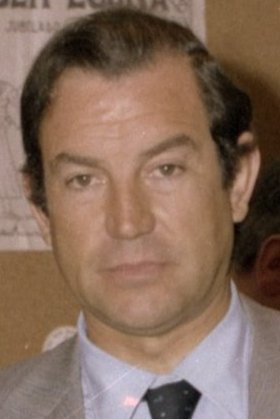

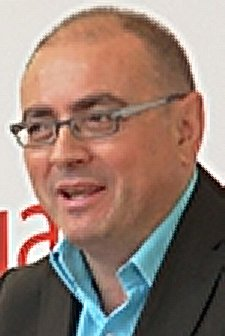
	First party	Second party	Third party
Leader	Juan José Ibarretxe	Carlos Iturgaiz	Arnaldo Otegi
Party	EAJ/PNV	PP	EH
Leader since	31 January 1998	5 October 1996	14 February 1998
Leader's seat	Álava	Biscay	Guipúzcoa
Last election	22 seats, 29.3%	11 seats, 14.2%	11 seats, 16.0% (Note: Results for HB in the 1994 election.)
Seats won	21	16	14
Seat change	▼1	▲5	▲3
Popular vote	350,322	251,743	224,001
Percentage	27.6%	19.9%	17.7%
Swing	▼1.7 pp	▲5.7 pp	▲1.7 pp
	Fourth party	Fifth party	Sixth party
Leader	Nicolás Redondo	Carlos Garaikoetxea	Javier Madrazo
Party	PSE–EE (PSOE)	EA	IU/EB
Leader since	20 October 1997	4 September 1986	14 May 1994
Leader's seat	Biscay	Guipúzcoa	Biscay
Last election	12 seats, 16.8%	8 seats, 10.1%	6 seats, 9.0%
Seats won	14	6	2
Seat change	▲2	▼2	▼4
Popular vote	220,052	108,635	71,064
Percentage	17.4%	8.6%	5.6%
Swing	▲0.6 pp	▼1.5 pp	▼3.4 pp
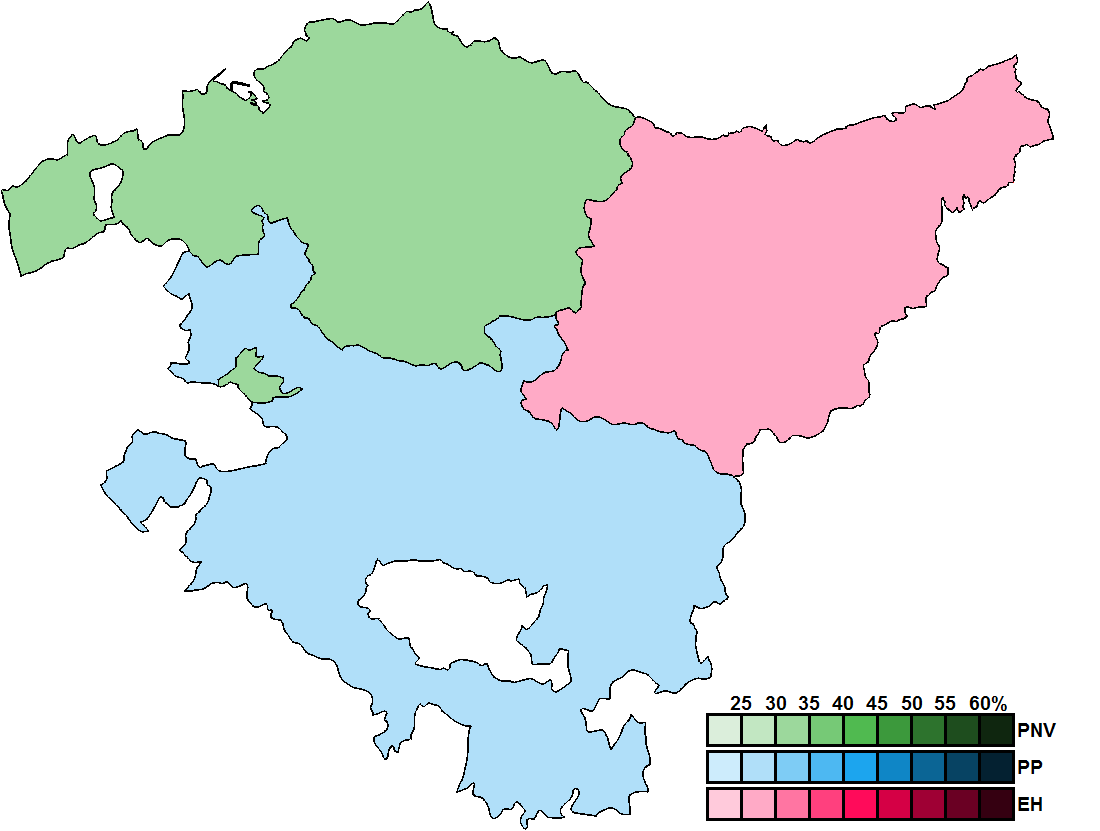
Lehendakari before election
José Antonio Ardanza
EAJ/PNV
Lehendakari after election
Juan José Ibarretxe
EAJ/PNV

A regional election was held in the Basque Country on 25 October 1998 to elect the 6th Parliament of the autonomous community. All 75 seats in the Parliament were up for election.

The Basque Nationalist Party (EAJ/PNV) won 21 seats, the People's Party (PP) came second for the first time with 16 seats, the Basque Citizens (EH) coalition and the Socialist Party of the Basque Country–Basque Country Left (PSE–EE) won 14 seats each.

== Overview ==
Under the 1979 Statute of Autonomy, the Basque Parliament was the unicameral legislature of the Basque Autonomous Community, having legislative power in devolved matters, as well as the ability to grant or withdraw confidence from a lehendakari. The electoral and procedural rules were supplemented by national law provisions.

=== Date ===
The term of the Basque Parliament expired four years after the date of its previous election, unless it was dissolved earlier. The election decree was required to be issued no later than 25 days before the scheduled expiration date of parliament and published on the following day in the Official Gazette of the Basque Country (BOPV), with election day taking place 54 days after the decree's publication. The previous election was held on 23 October 1994, which meant that the chamber's term would have expired on 23 October 1998. The election decree was required to be published in the BOPV no later than 29 September 1998, setting the latest possible date for election day on 22 November 1998.

The lehendakari had the prerogative to dissolve the Basque Parliament at any given time and call a snap election, provided that no motion of no confidence was in process. In the event of an investiture process failing to elect a lehendakari within a 60-day period from the Parliament's reconvening, the chamber was to be automatically dissolved and a fresh election called.

The Basque Parliament was officially dissolved on 1 September 1998 with the publication of the corresponding decree in the BOPV, setting election day for 25 October.

=== Electoral system ===
Voting for the Parliament was based on universal suffrage, comprising all Spanish nationals over 18 years of age, registered in the Basque Country and with full political rights, provided that they had not been deprived of the right to vote by a final sentence, nor were legally incapacitated.

The Basque Parliament had 75 seats. All were elected in three multi-member constituencies—corresponding to the provinces of Álava, Biscay and Guipúzcoa, each of which was assigned a fixed number of 25 seats to provide for an equal parliamentary representation of the three provinces—using the D'Hondt method and closed-list proportional voting, with a five percent-threshold of valid votes (including blank ballots) in each constituency.

The law did not provide for by-elections to fill vacant seats; instead, any vacancies arising after the proclamation of candidates and during the legislative term were filled by the next candidates on the party lists or, when required, by designated substitutes.

=== Outgoing parliament ===
The table below shows the composition of the parliamentary groups in the chamber at the time of dissolution.

Parliamentary composition in September 1998
Groups	Parties	Legislators	
Groups	Parties	Seats	Total
Basque Nationalists Parliamentary Group	EAJ/PNV	22	22
Basque Socialists Parliamentary Group	PSE–EE (PSOE)	12	12
Popular Unity's Parliamentary Group	HB	11	11
Basque People's Parliamentary Group	PP	11	11
Basque Solidarity Parliamentary Group	EA	8	8
Alavese Foralist Parliamentary Group	UA	4	4
Mixed Group	IU/EB	5	7
Mixed Group	Berdeak	1	7
Mixed Group	DFA	1	7

== Parties and candidates ==
The electoral law allowed for parties and federations registered in the interior ministry, alliances and groupings of electors to present lists of candidates. Parties and federations intending to form an alliance were required to inform the relevant electoral commission within 10 days of the election call, whereas groupings of electors needed to secure the signature of at least one percent of the electorate in the constituencies for which they sought election, disallowing electors from signing for more than one list.

Below is a list of the main parties and alliances which contested the election:

Candidacy	Parties and alliances	Leading candidate	Ideology	Previous result		Gov.	Ref.
Candidacy	Parties and alliances	Leading candidate	Ideology	Vote %	Seats	Gov.	Ref.
EAJ/PNV	List: Basque Nationalist Party (EAJ/PNV)	Juan José Ibarretxe	Basque nationalism Christian democracy Conservative liberalism	29.3%	22	Yes	
PSE–EE (PSOE)	List: Socialist Party of the Basque Country–Basque Country Left (PSE–EE (PSOE))	Nicolás Redondo	Social democracy	16.8%	12	No	
EH	List: Popular Unity (HB) – Basque Nationalist Action (EAE/ANV); Stand Up (Zutik)	Arnaldo Otegi	Basque independence Abertzale left Revolutionary socialism	16.0%	11	No	
PP	List: People's Party (PP)	Carlos Iturgaiz	Conservatism; Christian democracy	14.2%	11	No	
EA	List: Eusko Alkartasuna (EA)	Carlos Garaikoetxea	Basque nationalism Social democracy	10.1%	8	Yes	
IU/EB	List: United Left (IU/EB)	Javier Madrazo	Socialism; Communism	9.0%	6	No	
UA	List: Alavese Unity (UA)	Pablo Mosquera	Alavese regionalism Christian democracy	2.7%	5	No	

== Opinion polls ==
The tables below list opinion polling results in reverse chronological order, showing the most recent first and using the dates when the survey fieldwork was done, as opposed to the date of publication. Where the fieldwork dates are unknown, the date of publication is given instead. The highest percentage figure in each polling survey is displayed with its background shaded in the leading party's colour. If a tie ensues, this is applied to the figures with the highest percentages. The "Lead" column on the right shows the percentage-point difference between the parties with the highest percentages in a poll.

=== Voting intention estimates ===
The table below lists weighted voting intention estimates. Refusals are generally excluded from the party vote percentages, while question wording and the treatment of "don't know" responses and those not intending to vote may vary between polling organisations. When available, seat projections determined by the polling organisations are displayed below (or in place of) the percentages in a smaller font; 38 seats were required for an absolute majority in the Basque Parliament.

Color key:

Exit poll

Polling firm/Commissioner	Fieldwork date	Sample size	Turnout	PNV	PSE–EE (PSOE)	HB EH	PP	EA	IU/EB	UA	Lead
1998 regional election	25 Oct 1998	—N/a	70.0	27.6; 21	17.4; 14	17.7; 14	19.9; 16	8.6; 6	5.6; 2	1.2; 2	7.7
Eco Consulting/EITB	25 Oct 1998	21,000	?	28.9; 21/23	16.0; 11/13	20.9; 16/18	14.7; 13/15	8.6; 5/7	6.2; 3/5	1.0; 1/2	8.0
Sondaxe/Tele 5	25 Oct 1998	2,250	?	? 21	? 16	? 11	? 15	? 6	? 5	? 1	?
Sigma Dos/Antena 3	25 Oct 1998	?	?	? 21/22	? 12/14	? 12/13	? 15	? 5/7	? 4/5	? 2/3	?
Demoscopia/El País	18 Oct 1998	?	65–67	30.4; 21/22	17.4; 13/14	15.8; 11/12	16.8; 13/15	9.7; 6/7	8.7; 5/6	1.2; 2	13.0
Sigma Dos/El Mundo	14–16 Oct 1998	1,000	?	30.2; 21/23	14.7; 10/12	16.6; 12/14	17.8; 13/15	9.9; 7	7.8; 5	1.5; 3	12.4
Gallup/ABC	9–14 Oct 1998	1,506	76.0	30.8; 22/23	18.6; 14/15	15.3; 11	15.4; 13/14	9.5; 7	8.3; 5	0.9; 1/2	12.2
Ábaco/Tele 5	13 Oct 1998	?	?	? 21	? 15	? 12	? 16	? 5	? 5	? 1	?
Opina/La Vanguardia	12–13 Oct 1998	1,500	70	29.0; 20/21	19.0; 13/15	15.0; 11/12	18.0; 14/15	9.0; 8	7.0; 6	1.0; 2	10.0
Bergareche/El Correo	8–12 Oct 1998	4,650	?	27.2; 20/21	19.5; 15/16	14.9; 11/12	17.1; 14/15	8.4; 5/6	8.4; 5/6	1.3; 2	7.7
PP	9 Oct 1998	?	?	? 22/23	? 13/14	? 11/12	? 14/15	? 6	? 3/4	? 2	?
Siadeco/GPS	2–9 Oct 1998	2,000	66.0	29.0; 22	16.1; 12	18.4; 14	15.3; 13	9.7; 7	8.5; 5	1.4; 2	10.6
CIS	25 Sep–8 Oct 1998	2,097	64.7	29.3; 21/22	18.4; 14/15	16.1; 12/13	16.7; 13/14	8.7; 6	7.7; 5	1.4; 2	10.9
PSOE	6–7 Oct 1998	1,354	?	? 23	? 15	? 11	? 14	? 6	? 4	? 2	?
Siadeco/GPS	21–26 Sep 1998	2,000	67.0	29.4; 22	15.9; 12	17.7; 13	15.3; 12	9.9; 7	8.7; 6	1.5; 3	11.7
Siadeco/GPS	7–15 Sep 1998	2,000	65.0	29.6; 22	16.5; 12	15.8; 11	15.5; 13	10.0; 8	9.3; 6	1.5; 3	13.1
Sigma Dos/El Mundo	28 Aug–3 Sep 1998	900	?	30.0; 21	16.2; 13	15.2; 11	16.5; 14	9.2; 6	9.1; 6	2.0; 4	13.5
CPS/EHU	1–15 Jun 1998	1,400	64	29.0; 20/21	21.0; 15/16	13.0; 10	17.0; 13/15	9.0; 6/7	7.0; 5	1.0; 2/3	8.0
Bergareche/El Correo	4–9 Jun 1998	2,625	?	28.3; 21	20.1; 15/16	12.6; 9/10	17.4; 14/15	7.7; 6	8.8; 6/7	1.1; 2	8.2
Siadeco/GPS	11–20 May 1998	2,846	62.5	29.5; 22	17.0; 14	14.9; 11	16.0; 13	10.0; 7	9.1; 6	1.4; 2	12.5
CIS	6–31 Mar 1998	2,099	61.4	29.2; 21/22	18.4; 14/15	15.3; 11	16.5; 13/14	9.7; 7/8	7.6; 5	1.5; 2	10.8
Bergareche/El Correo	6–13 Mar 1998	2,636	?	26.6; 20/22	20.0; 16	12.2; 9	18.6; 16	7.4; 5	9.0; 5/6	1.4; 2/3	6.6
Siadeco/GPS	30 Jan–7 Feb 1998	1,500	65.0	29.6; 22	16.6; 12	14.4; 11	16.4; 13	10.2; 8	9.1; 6	1.3; 3	13.0
Bergareche/El Correo	9 Nov 1997	2,682	?	29.6; 23	19.2; 15	12.0; 9	16.7; 15	8.1; 6	7.5; 5	1.3; 2	10.4
Siadeco/GPS	16–24 Sep 1997	?	66.0	29.9; 22	16.6; 12	14.0; 11	16.2; 13	10.2; 9	9.0; 5	1.4; 3	13.3
Sigma Dos/El Mundo	16–17 Jul 1997	800	?	32.5	15.6	12.9	17.9	9.7	8.8	2.2	14.6
CPS/EHU	8 Jun 1997	1,400	?	29.1; 20	18.5; 15	12.5; 10	14.0; 12	9.2; 7	9.4; 7	2.0; 4	10.6
Siadeco/GPS	25 Mar 1997	?	64.0	29.6; 22	16.8; 12	13.7; 11	15.6; 12	10.1; 8	9.8; 7	1.5; 3	12.8
1996 general election	3 Mar 1996	—N/a	71.5	25.0 (18)	23.7 (20)	12.3 (9)	18.3 (15)	8.2 (6)	9.2 (7)	–	1.3
1995 foral elections	28 May 1995	—N/a	63.9	28.4 (22)	16.7 (13)	14.4 (11)	15.5 (11)	10.9 (9)	8.1 (5)	2.1 (4)	11.7
1994 regional election	23 Oct 1994	—N/a	59.7	29.3; 22	16.8; 12	16.0; 11	14.2; 11	10.1; 8	9.0; 6	2.7; 5	12.5

=== Voting preferences ===
The table below lists raw, unweighted voting preferences.

Polling firm/Commissioner	Fieldwork date	Sample size	PNV	PSE–EE (PSOE)	HB EH	PP	EA	IU/EB	UA	Question	X mark	Lead
1998 regional election (Note: Does not include non-resident citizens.)	25 Oct 1998	—N/a	19.1	12.0	12.3	13.8	5.9	3.9	0.9	—N/a	29.4	5.3
CIS	25 Sep–8 Oct 1998	2,097	24.2	5.2	9.0	3.0	4.6	2.6	0.2	35.9	12.0	15.2
1996 general election	3 Mar 1996	—N/a	17.9	16.9	8.8	13.1	5.9	6.6	–	—N/a	28.1	1.0
1995 foral elections	28 May 1995	—N/a	18.0	10.6	9.1	9.8	6.9	5.1	1.3	—N/a	36.1	7.4
1994 regional election	23 Oct 1994	—N/a	17.3	9.9	9.5	8.3	6.0	5.3	1.6	—N/a	40.1	7.4

== Results ==
=== Overall ===
← Summary of the 25 October 1998 Basque Parliament election results →
Parties and alliances	Popular vote			Seats	
Parties and alliances	Votes	%	±pp	Total	+/−
Basque Nationalist Party (EAJ/PNV)	350,322	27.62	−1.70	21	−1
People's Party (PP)	251,743	19.85	+5.69	16	+5
Basque Citizens (EH)^{1}	224,001	17.66	+1.65	14	+3
Socialist Party of the Basque Country–Basque Country Left (PSE–EE (PSOE))	220,052	17.35	+0.52	14	+2
Basque Solidarity (EA)	108,635	8.57	−1.56	6	−2
United Left (IU/EB)	71,064	5.60	−3.39	2	−4
Alavese Unity (UA)	15,738	1.24	−1.44	2	−3
Natural Law Party (PLN/LNA)	4,858	0.38	New	0	±0
Humanist Party (PH)	3,288	0.26	New	0	±0
Basque Country Greens (EHB)	864	0.07	New	0	±0
Blank ballots	17,641	1.39	−0.35		
Total	1,268,206			75	±0
Valid votes	1,268,206	99.47	+0.06		
Invalid votes	6,802	0.53	−0.06		
Votes cast / turnout	1,275,008	69.99	+10.30		
Abstentions	546,600	30.01	−10.30		
Registered voters	1,821,608				
Sources
Footnotes: ^{1} Basque Citizens results are compared to Popular Unity totals in the 1994 election.

Popular vote
EAJ/PNV	27.62%
PP	19.85%
EH	17.66%
PSE–EE (PSOE)	17.35%
EA	8.57%
IU/EB	5.60%
UA	1.24%
Others	0.71%
Blank ballots	1.39%

Seats
EAJ/PNV	28.00%
PP	21.33%
EH	18.67%
PSE–EE (PSOE)	18.67%
EA	8.00%
IU/EB	2.67%
UA	2.67%

=== Distribution by constituency ===
Constituency	PNV		PP		EH		PSE–EE		EA		IU/EB		UA	
Constituency	%	S	%	S	%	S	%	S	%	S	%	S	%	S
Álava	21.6	6	26.7	7	12.1	3	16.8	5	6.3	1	5.6	1	8.4	2
Biscay	32.6	9	20.2	5	14.6	4	18.3	5	6.0	1	6.2	1	0.1	–
Guipúzcoa	21.7	6	16.4	4	25.2	7	16.0	4	13.9	4	4.6	–	0.1	–
Total	27.6	21	19.9	16	17.7	14	17.4	14	8.6	6	5.6	2	1.2	2

== Aftermath ==
=== Government formation ===
Investiture
Ballot →	29 December 1998	
Required majority →	38 out of 75	
Juan José Ibarretxe (PNV): • PNV (21); • EH (13); • EA (6)	40 / 75	check
Carlos Iturgaiz (PP): • PP (16); • UA (2)	18 / 75	X mark
Abstentions/Blank ballots: • PSE–EE (13); • IU/EB (2)	15 / 75	
Absentees: • EH (1); • PSE–EE (1)	2 / 75	

=== 2000 motions of no confidence ===
Motion of no confidence Nomination of Nicolás Redondo (PSE–EE)
Ballot →	5 October 2000
Required majority →	38 out of 75
Yes: • PP (16); • PSE–EE (14); • UA (2)	32 / 75
No: • PNV (21); • EA (6); • IU/EB (2)	29 / 75
Abstentions	0 / 75
Absentees: • EH (14)	14 / 75

Motion of no confidence Nomination of Carlos Iturgaiz (PP)
Ballot →	5 October 2000
Required majority →	38 out of 75
Yes: • PP (16); • PSE–EE (14); • UA (2)	32 / 75
No: • PNV (21); • EA (6); • IU/EB (2)	29 / 75
Abstentions	0 / 75
Absentees: • EH (14)	14 / 75

== Bibliography ==
Legislation

- Ley Orgánica 3/1979, de 18 de diciembre, de Estatuto de Autonomía para el País Vasco (Organic Law 3/1979). Official State Gazette (in Spanish). 18 December 1979 [version as of 22 December 1979]. BOE-A-1979-30177.
- Ley 7/1981, de 30 de junio, sobre Ley de Gobierno (Law 7/1981). Official State Gazette (in Spanish). 30 June 1981 [version as of 23 November 1988]. BOE-A-2012-5927.
- Ley Orgánica 5/1985, de 19 de junio, del Régimen Electoral General (Organic Law 5/1985). Official State Gazette (in Spanish). 19 June 1985 [version as of 16 June 1998]. BOE-A-1985-11672.
- Ley 5/1990, de 15 de junio, de Elecciones al Parlamento Vasco (Law 5/1990). Official State Gazette (in Spanish). 15 June 1990 [version as of 9 July 1998]. BOE-A-2012-2859.
- Decreto 14/1998, de 31 de agosto, del Lehendakari, por el que se disuelve el Parlamento Vasco y se convocan elecciones (PDF) (Decree 14/1998). Official Gazette of the Basque Country (in Spanish). 31 August 1998.

Other

- Pallarés, Francesc (1998). "Las elecciones autonómicas de 1998 en el País Vasco" (PDF). Public Law Observatory (in Spanish). University of Barcelona: 594–606.
