= José Antonio Ardanza =

Spanish politician (1941–2024)

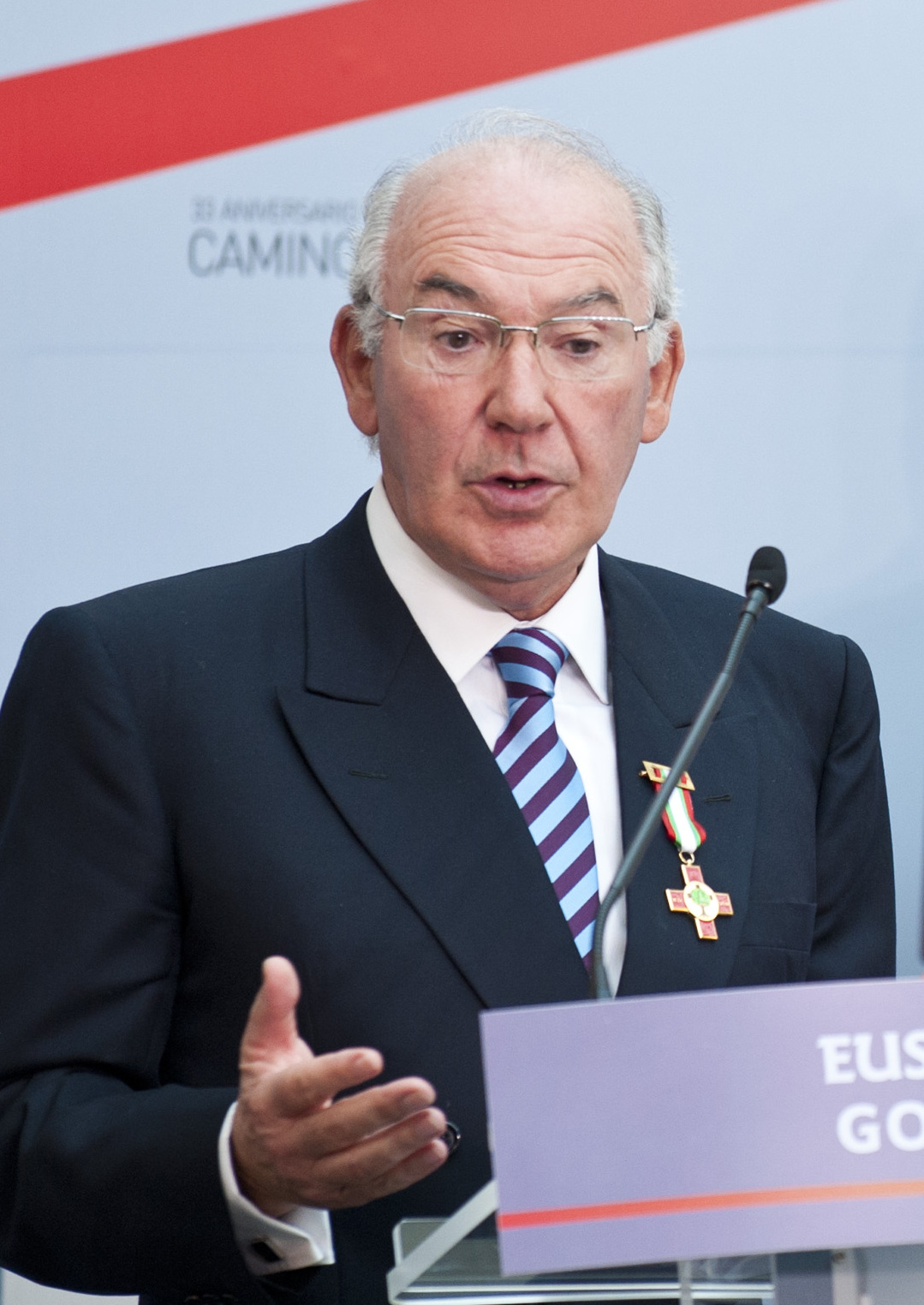
- Ardanza in 2012

Lehendakari of the Basque Country
- In office 26 January 1985 – 2 January 1999
- Monarch: Juan Carlos I
- Vice President: Javier García Egotxeaga (1985–1987); Ramón Jáuregui (1987–1991); Jon Imanol Azúa (1991–1995); Juan José Ibarretxe (1995–1999)
- Preceded by: Carlos Garaikoetxea
- Succeeded by: Juan José Ibarretxe

Personal details
- Born: 10 June 1941 Elorrio, Basque Country, Spain
- Died: 8 April 2024 (aged 82) Gautegiz Arteaga, Basque Country, Spain
- Party: Basque Nationalist Party

José Antonio Ardanza Garro (10 June 1941 – 8 April 2024) was a Spanish politician who became the second elected Lehendakari (President of the Basque Autonomous Community, Spain) after the approval of the Statute of Autonomy. He was in office between 1985 and 1999.

He was a member of the Basque Nationalist Party (EAJ/PNV). During his mandate, which was the longest for a lehendakari in democracy, he achieved the development of the Statute of Autonomy, the reindustrialization of the territory, the maintenance of good relations with Navarra, the territorial deployment of the Ertzaintza and promoted the Ajuria Enea pact in 1988, which at that time became the broadest political agreement to confront the terrorist group ETA and pacify the Basque Country, which during Ardanza's mandate the group killed more than three hundred people and which in 1998 announced the unsuccessful indefinite truce after the Estella pact.

== Early life and education ==
José Antonio Ardanza Garro was born in Elorrio, Basque Country, on 10 June 1941, to a Basque nationalist family of rural origin. Both of his parents, Damián Ardanza and María Garro were born in Baserris in Elorrio and Ziortza-Bolibar, respectively. Damián participated in the crackdown of the Asturian miners' strike of 1934 and later enrolled to the Euzko Gudarostea at the start of the Spanish Civil War. When Ardanza was 3 years old, María died, after which he moved to Ondarroa with his paternal family. Ardanza returned to Elorrio in September 1948 after Damián remarried with Pilar Macazaga. According to Ardanza, despite his initial sullenness towards his stepmother, they eventually accepted one another.

As a child he wanted to be a priest and studied at the Diocesan Seminary of Derio until he dropped out at the age of 18 and then attended the Jesuit College of Durango. In order to attend university he asked for a scholarship and worked as a teacher of Latin and Greek. After getting a Licentiate in Law from the University of Deusto he worked at Caja Laboral as a legal advisor from 1969 until his election as General Deputy of Gipuzkoa in 1983.

== Early political career ==
=== Opposition to Francoism ===
Ardanza started his political activity shortly after entering university, when he joined EIA, a Basque nationalist student's union. In 1961, he joined Euzko Gaztedi (EGI), the youth wing of the Basque Nationalist Party (PNV), both of which at the time were outlawed by Francoist Spain. During his time in the underground opposition, he was known by the pseudonym "Pimpinela". He became a member of EGI's board in 1961 or 1962, following the internal split that led to the formation of ETA. Initially, he maintained contact with members of ETA due to their common struggle for Basque independence, but he later distanced from ETA due to its support for violence and its adherence to the Marxist national liberation theory.

In January 1965, at the local festivals of a town, a group of young people, including some members of EGI were arrested for playing the txistu and the drum, instruments typical of Basque folklore that represented opposition to the Francoist dictatorship. Subsequently, several members of EGI's boards were arrested, but Ardanza managed to escape after he was warned that he was being persecuted by the police while he was at class. He returned to his home in Elorrio and said goodbye to his stepmother by saying, "Mom, goodbye, see you!". For a short time, he stayed in a shack with a couple members of the Communist Party of Spain, and he then hid in a house close to Bilbao for a month. Later, thanks to a cousin who was a member of the Passionists, he took refuge in the Passionist convent of Euba for another month. After being recognised by some neighbours while he was receiving communion, he escaped from the convent and took up exile in the French Basque Country.

Soon after, Ardanza returned to Spain and continued his studies at university. However, he had to maintain himself in the obscurity due to an arrest warrant against him being still in force. Following the decapitation of EGI's board in 1965, he distanced himself from the organization, with many former colleagues joining ETA. Reportedly, some years later, he became close to the Basque Socialist Party until the party's failure at the 1977 Spanish general election.

=== Local politician ===
Ardanza moved to Mondragón in 1969, when he started working at Caja Laboral. Eventually, he was chosen to lead the candidacy of the PNV in Modragón at the 1979 local election and became the first democratically elected mayor of the town after commanding a majority of 11 seats out of the 21 in the city council. Having entered the electoral list as an independent, he joined the PNV later that year. His tenure was marked by political tension, which caused him a health crisis, for which he was on sick leave for a time. While mayor of Mondragón, he was offered to lead the PNV's list for Gipuzkoa ahead of the 1982 Spanish general election and to become minister of Labour in the first government of Carlos Garaikoetxea, both of which he declined. Ultimately, in 1983, he was elected member of the General Assemblies of Gipuzkoa.

== Lehendakari (1985–1999) ==
In December 1984, Lehendakari Carlos Garaikoetxea announced intention to resign following an internal split with the EAJ/PNV over the Law of Historical Territories. Subsequently, the EAJ/PNV's Central Executive Branch (Euzkadi Buru Batzar, EBB) proposed a shortlist of three possible successors: former EAJ/PNV president Xabier Arzalluz, Vice Lehendakari Mario Fernández and Ardanza. After reluctancy from Arzalluz and Fernandez, Ardanza was unanimously selected as candidate for the investidure. Ardanza was elected as Lehendakari in the second round after securing support from his party and some deputies of the Socialist Party of the Basque Country (PSE–PSOE) at the Basque Parliament and took office on 26 January 1985.

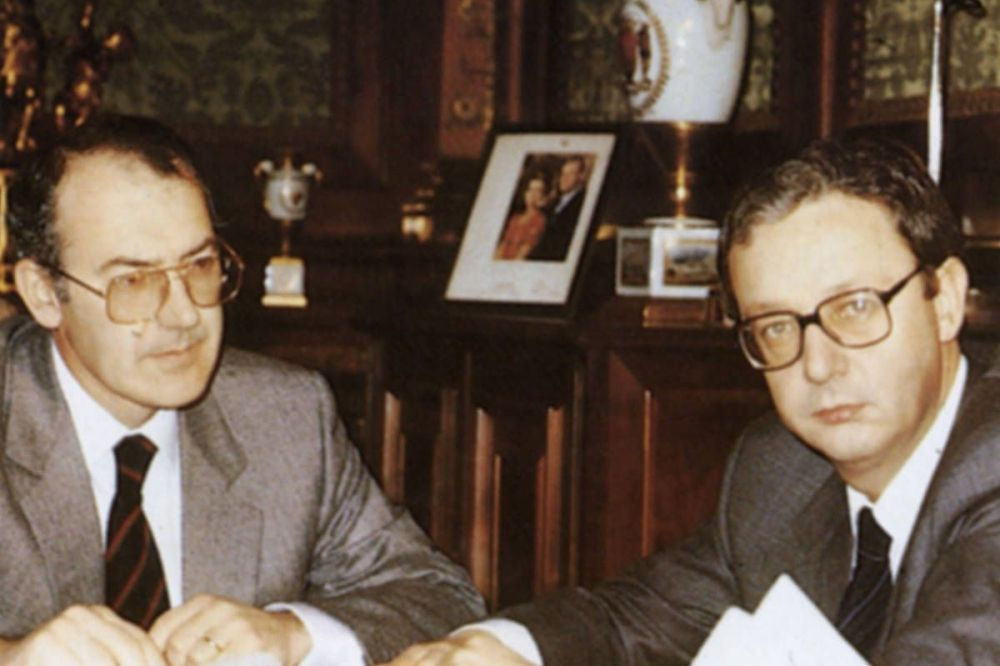
José Antonio Ardanza and PSE-PSOE leader Txiki Benegas, 1987

Despite the victory of the PSE-PSOE in the 1986 Basque regional election, Ardanza achieved an absolute parliamentary majority to be re-elected lehendakari after winning back the votes of the Basque socialists again on 26 February 1987. During this legislature, Ardanza achieved one of his most important milestones in his administration: the Agreement for the Pacification and Normalisation of Euskadi (Anju Eria Pact) in 1988. This agreement was the broadest political agreement in the Basque Country, achieving unity of action among the democratic political parties for the eradication of ETA terrorism, the pacification of the territory and the defence of democratic values and coexistence. Until 1990, Ardanza governed in coalition with PSE-PSOE.

Ardanza won the 1990 Basque regional election and created the first tripartite government between EAJ/PNV, PSE-PSOE and Eusko Alkartasuna (EA), although it lasted only ten months and EA abandoned the coalition. In February 1992, he signed the contract in New York to open the Guggenheim Museum Bilbao, which was inaugurated in October 1997. He was re-elected lehendakari in the elections of 1994 signing again a tripartite with PSE-PSOE and EA.

In May 1997, Ardanza announced his intention not to run for reelection in the elections of 1998 and leave politics. His last months in office were dedicated to designing the "Plan Ardanza", a peace plan that he promoted in February 1998 to open an unlimited dialogue with Herri Batasuna, a far-left Basque nationalist coalition. The PP and the PSOE reacted against the Plan and the plan failed to succeed on 17 March 1998. Also in that year, ETA's "Estella truce" was achieved, after an agreement between EAJ/PNV and HB in which Ardanza did not intervene. He was succeeded on 2 January 1999 as lehendakari by his vice-lehendakari Juan José Ibarretxe, who managed to maintain the victory of the EAJ/PNV in the elections.

== Later years ==
After leaving politics, in 1999, Ardanza was named president of the telecommunications company Euskaltel, a position he held until 2011. That year, he presented his memoirs "Pasión por Euskadi".

== Personal life and death ==
Ardanza died from cancer on 8 April 2024 in his home in Biscay at the age of 82.

== Honors ==
- Cross of the Tree of Gernika (Government of the Basque Country, 2012)

== Sources ==
- Ardanza, José Antonio (2011). Pasión por Euskadi: Memorias. El compromiso del lendakari que gobernó para todos los vascos (in Spanish). Ediciones Destino. ISBN 978-84-233-4557-1.
- Iglesias, María Antonia (2011). Memoria de Euskadi: La terapia de la verdad: todos lo cuentan todo (in Spanish). Penguin Random House. ISBN 978-8-40-301144-1.

Political offices
Preceded by –	Mayor of Mondragón; 1979–1983	Succeeded by Álvaro Arregi
Preceded by Xabier Aizarna	Deputy General of Gipuzkoa; 1983–1985	Succeeded by Imanol Murua
Preceded by Carlos Garaikoetxea	Lehendakari of the Basque Government; 1985–1999	Succeeded by Juan José Ibarretxe
