= Coalition for a New Socialist Party =

Coalition for a New Socialist Party Coalición por un Nuevo Partido Socialista
- Founded: 1992
- Dissolved: 1996
- Preceded by: Alliance for the Republic
- Succeeded by: Republican Coalition
- Ideology: Communism
- Political position: Far-left

Coalition for a New Socialist Party (Spanish: Coalición por un Nuevo Partido Socialista, CNPS) was a Spanish electoral alliance formed to contest the 1993 general election by the Internationalist Socialist Workers' Party (POSI), Socialist Democratic Alliance (ADS) and Socialist Democracy (DS). It contested the 1993 general election, the 1994 European Parliament election and several regional elections held throughout 1994 and 1995, as well as the 1992 Catalan parliamentary election under the Independent Socialists label (Spanish: Socialistas Independientes, SI).

== Member parties ==
- Internationalist Socialist Workers' Party (POSI)
- Socialist Democratic Alliance (ADS)
- Socialist Democracy (DS)
