= Socialist Democracy (Spain) =

Socialist political party (1990-1992)

Socialist Democracy Democracia Socialista
- Leader: Ricardo García Damborenea
- Secretary-General: Juan Vicente Alvarez Romero
- Founded: 1990
- Headquarters: C/ Paseo del Prado, 14.1o.A, Madrid
- Ideology: Socialism
- Political position: Left-wing
- National affiliation: Coalition for a New Socialist Party

Socialist Democracy (Spanish: Democracia Socialista, DS) was a Spanish political party of socialist ideology founded in 1990 by Ricardo García Damborenea, the ex-leader of the Spanish Socialist Workers' Party (PSOE) in the province of Biscay.

== History ==
The party was formed after García Damborenea was expelled from the PSOE for trying to create an "internal current" and "[parallel] structure" of the same name. In 1992 the party joined the Coalition for a New Socialist Party, which failed to gain any representation at the national or regional level.

== Elections ==
- Andalusian regional election, 1990: 14,495 votes (0.53%).
- Basque regional election, 1990: 5.023 votos (0.49%).
- Valencian regional election, 1991: 5.207 votos (0.26%).
- Local elections, 1991: 8.747 votos (0.05%). 4 municipal councillors.
