= Alliance for the Republic (Spain) =

Alliance for the Republic Alianza por la República
- Founded: 1989
- Dissolved: 1992
- Succeeded by: Coalition for a New Socialist Party
- Ideology: Communism
- Political position: Left-wing

Alliance for the Republic (Spanish: Alianza por la República, AxR) was a Spanish electoral alliance formed to contest the 1989 general election by the Internationalist Socialist Workers' Party (POSI) and Socialist Democratic Alliance (ADS). In 1992, the member parties of AxR, POSI and ADS, joined the Socialist Democracy party (DS) into the Coalition for a New Socialist Party (CNPS).

== Member parties ==
- Internationalist Socialist Workers' Party (POSI)
- Socialist Democratic Alliance (ADS)
