= Alavese Unity =

Political party in Basque Country, Spain

Alavese Unity Unidad Alavesa
- Founded: 1989
- Dissolved: 2005
- Split from: People's Party
- Headquarters: Vitoria-Gasteiz, Basque Country
- Ideology: Alavese regionalism Christian democracy Spanish unionism Opposition to Basque nationalism
- Political position: Centre-right

Alavese Unity (Spanish: Unidad Alavesa) was a political party in the Basque Country based in the province of Álava, that existed between 1989 and 2005.
