= Internationalist Socialist Workers' Party =

Internationalist Socialist Workers' Party Partido Obrero Socialista Internacionalista
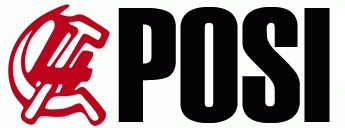
- Founded: 1980
- Ideology: Trotskyism
- Political position: Far-left
- International affiliation: Fourth International (ICR)

Website
- www.posicuarta.org

The Internationalist Socialist Workers' Party (Spanish: Partido Obrero Socialista Internacionalista, POSI) is a Spanish political party of trotskyist ideology founded in 1980. It was a member of the lambertist Fourth International (ICR).
