= Statute of Autonomy of the Basque Country of 1979 =

Spanish legal document

The Statute of Autonomy of the Basque Country of 1979 (Basque: Euskal Autonomia Erkidegoko Estatutua; Spanish: Estatuto de Autonomía del País Vasco), widely known as the Statute of Gernika (Basque: Gernikako Estatutua; Spanish: Estatuto de Guernica), is the legal document organizing the political system of the Autonomous Community of the Basque Country (Basque: Euskadiko Autonomi Erkidegoa) which includes the historical territories of Álava, Biscay and Gipuzkoa. It forms the region into one of the autonomous communities envisioned in the Spanish Constitution of 1978. The Statute was named "Statute of Gernika" after the city of Gernika, where its final form was approved on 29 December 1978. It was ratified by referendum on 25 October 1979, despite the abstention of more than 40% of the electorate. The statute was accepted by the lower house of the Spanish Parliament on November 29 and the Spanish Senate on December 12.

The statute was meant to encompass all the historical provinces inhabited by the Basque people in Spain, who had proved a strong will for acknowledgement of a separate identity and status, even in non Basque nationalist circles. A draft statute for the Spanish Basque Country was then drawn up to provide for that urge with a view to comprising all the historically Basque territories. However, the blueprint came up against much opposition in Navarre (Unión del Pueblo Navarro party founded) and rightist and nationalist circles of the still Francoist central administration. At the beginning of the 1980s the Spanish Socialist party and their regional branch too swerved to a Navarre-only stance, paving the way to a separate autonomous community.

The Statute of Autonomy of the Basque Country retained though in its wording the spirit of the original blueprint, namely allowing the necessary means for the development in liberty of the Basque people, while now limited only to the western Álava, Gipuzkoa and Biscay provinces. The possibility of Navarre joining in is anyway emphasized and provisioned for, insomuch as they are identified as Basque people, should that be their will.

It established a system of parliamentary government, in which the president (chief of government) or lehendakari is elected by the Basque Autonomous Parliament among its members. Election of the Parliament is by universal suffrage and parliament consists of 75 deputies, 25 from each of the three Historic Territories of the community. The parliament is vested with powers over a broad variety of areas, including agriculture, industry; from culture, arts and libraries, to tax collection, policing, and transportation. Basque (as a right) and Spanish (as a right and duty) are official languages.

The equal representation of the provinces regardless of actual population was a wink to Alava and Navarre, the least populated and least prone to Basque nationalism of the provinces. However the Navarrese society seems content with its current Amejoramiento del Fuero.

The Ibarretxe Plan was a proposal to revise the statute so as to amplify Basque autonomy put forward by the ruling Basque Nationalist Party.

== Earlier statutes ==
Up to early 19th century, the Basque districts maintained a great degree of self-government under their charters (they came to be known as the Exempt Provinces), i.e. they held a different status from other areas within the Crown of Castile/Spain, involving taxes and customs, separate military conscription, etc.), operating almost autonomously.

After the First Carlist War (1833–1839), home rule was abolished and substituted by the Compromise Act (Ley Paccionada) in Navarre (1841) and a diminished chartered regime in the three western provinces (up to 1876). After the definite abolition of the Charters (end of Third Carlist War), former laws and customs were largely absorbed into Spanish centralist rule with little regard for regional idiosyncrasies. As a result, attempts were made by Carlists, Basque nationalists and some liberal forces in the Basque region of Spain to establish a collaboration among them and restore some kind of self-empowerment ("autonomy"), while the Catalans developed their own Catalan Commonwealth.

Attempts at a unified Basque statute including Navarre were repeatedly postponed until the occasion seemed to have arrived at the onset of the Second Spanish Republic with a statute for the four Basque provinces. A draft Basque Statute was approved by all four provinces (1931), but Carlists were divided, and the 1931 draft Statute of Estella did not achieve enough support, against a backdrop of heated controversy over the validity of the votes, as well as allegations of strong pressures on local representatives to tip the scale against the unitarian option (Assembly of Pamplona, 1932).

Following the works started for the Basque Statute, another proposal was eventually approved by the government of the Spanish Republic, already awash in the Civil War, this time only including the provinces of Gipuzkoa, Biscay and Álava. Its effectivity was limited to the Republic-controlled areas of Biscay and a fringe of Gipuzkoa.

After the surrendering of the Basque Army in 1937, the statute was abolished. However, Francisco Franco allowed the continuation of a limited self-government for Alava and Navarre, thanking their support for the Spanish Nationalist uprising.

It is on the republican statute and the Alavese institutions that the current Statute of Gernika takes its legitimacy.

== Sources ==
- Iban Bilbao, The Basque Parliament and Government, Basque Studies Program Newsletter, Issue 27, 1983.
- IVAP (Basque Govt's admin agency), The Statute of Autonomy, the basic institutional instrument regulating the Basque Country.

== See also ==
- Autonomous communities of Spain
- Spanish transition to democracy
