= Bilbao City Council =

Local government body

Bilbao City Council Bilboko Udala

Type
- Type: Unicameral house of the Ayuntamiento of Bilbao

Leadership
- Mayor: Juan Mari Aburto, EAJ-PNV since 13 June 2015

Structure
- Political groups: Government (17): EAJ-PNV (12); PSE-EE PSOE (5); Opposition (12): EH Bildu (6); PP (4); EP (2)
- Length of term: 4 years

Elections
- Last election: 28 May 2023
- Next election: 23 May 2027

Meeting place
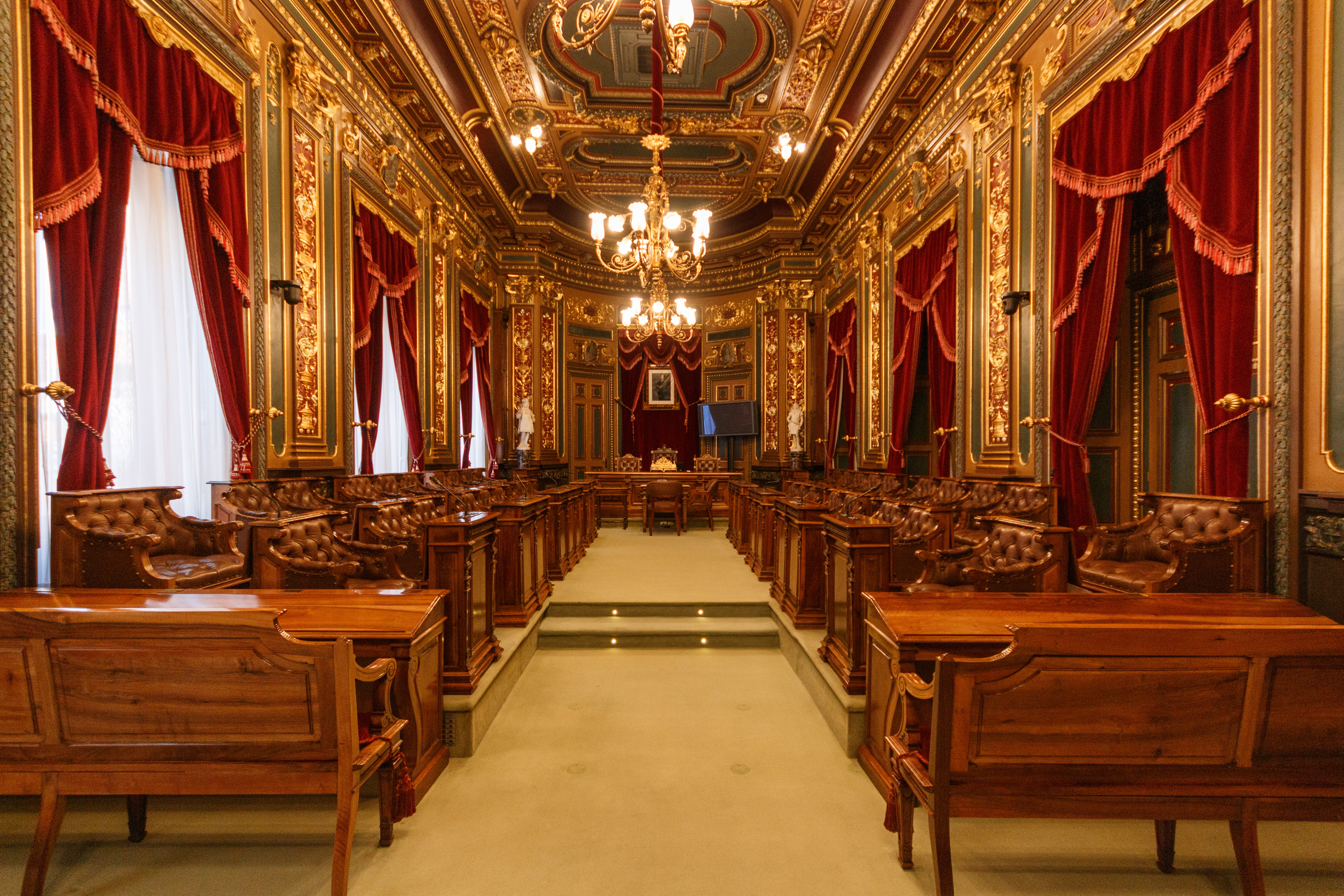
- Bilbao City Hall

Website
- www.bilbao.eus

Management
- Employees: 2,431 employees (2012)
- Budget: €512.8 million (2014)

The Bilbao City Council (Basque: Bilboko Udala) is the ayuntamiento of Bilbao (Spain). Its headquarter, the Bilbao City Hall, is located in the Ernesto Erkoreka Plaza. The city council is made up of an executive body and a normative municipal plenary. The executive body consists of the mayor and the Governing Junta of the Town of Bilbao (Spanish: Junta de Gobierno de la Villa de Bilbao). The council performs executive and administrative tasks, and functions in correspondence with the mayor. The junta consists of no more than nine people, its members can be appointed by the mayor.

== Municipal administration ==
The constituent is elected every four years by universal suffrage. The electoral census is made up of all registered residents in Bilbao over the age of 18 as well as nationals of Spain and other member states of the European Union. According to the General Electoral Regime Law (Spanish: Ley del Régimen Electoral General), the number of eligible councilors is based on the population of the municipality.

The municipal plenary serves to represent the citizenry in the municipal government. It is responsible for the debate and adoption of government policies including: regulations, laws, municipal budgets, urban planning plans, service management, etc. The plenary is made up of 29 councilors and is chaired by the mayor.

=== Mayoralty ===
These are the mayors who have governed the city council since 1979:

Mayors of Bilbao	From	To	Party
Jon Castañares Larreategui	19 April 1979	22 May 1983	EAJ-PNV
José Luis Robles Canibe	23 May 1983	19 July 1987	EAJ-PNV
José María Gorordo	20 July 1987	17 December 1990	EAJ-PNV
Jesús María Duñabeitia	20 December 1990	14 June 1991	EAJ-PNV
Josu Ortuondo Larrea	17 June 1991	2 July 1999	EAJ-PNV
Iñaki Azkuna Urreta	3 July 1999	20 March 2014	EAJ-PNV
Ibon Areso Mendiguren	21 March 2014	12 June 2015	EAJ-PNV
Juan María Aburto Rike	13 June 2015	Incumbent	EAJ-PNV

The mayor who has held office for the longest time since democracy has been Iñaki Azkuna (14 years) of the Basque Nationalist Party, a position he held from the 1999 elections until his death in 2014, reelected in 2003, 2007 and 2011. Previously, the other mayors who held office for the longest time were Joaquín Zuazagoitia Azcorra (16 years), Josu Ortuondo Larrea (8 years), Pilar Careaga Basabe (6 years), and Federico Moyúa Salazar (6 years).

=== Electoral results ===
Results of recent municipal elections in Bilbao
Political party	2023	2019	2015	2011	2007	2003	1999	1995	1991	1987	1983	1979
Political party	Seats	Seats	Seats	Seats	Seats	Seats	Seats	Seats	Seats	Seats	Seats	Seats
Basque Nationalist Party (EAJ-PNV)	12	14	13	15	13	13	9	9	11	9	11	13
Euskal Herria Bildu (EH Bildu)-Bildu	6	4	4	4	—	—	—	—	—	—	—	—
Socialist Party of the Basque Country–Basque Country Left (PSE-EE PSOE)	5	5	4	4	7	5	5	4	6	7	9	4
People's Party of the Basque Country (PP)-People's Alliance (AP)-People's Coalition (CP)	4	3	4	6	7	8	8	7	4	2	4	—
Elkarrekin Podemos (EP)-Udalberri-Bilbao en Común-Ezker Anitza-IU (EzAn–IU)-Equo Berdeak	2	3	2	—	—	—	—	—	—	—	—	—
United Left–Greens (EB-B)-Communist Party of the Basque Country (PCE-EPK)	0	0	0	0	2	3	1	2	0	0	0	0
Eusko Alkartasuna (EA)	EH Bildu	EH Bildu	EH Bildu	Bildu	0	EAJ-PNV	EAJ-PNV	0	2	3	—	—
Euskadiko Ezkerra (EE)	PSE-EE	PSE-EE	PSE-EE	PSE-EE	PSE-EE	PSE-EE	PSE-EE	PSE-EE	2	3	2	1
Ganemos Goazen Bilbao (GGB)	—	0	2	—	—	—	—	—	—	—	—	—
Euskal Herritarrok (EH)-Herri Batasuna (HB)	—	—	—	—	—	illegalised	4	2	4	5	3	6
Iniciativa Ciudadana Vasca (ICV-EHE)	—	—	—	—	—	—	2	5	—	—	—	—
Democratic and Social Centre (CDS)-Union of the Democratic Centre (UCD)	—	—	—	—	—	—	—	—	0	0	0	5

=== Political groups ===
The councillors form political groups, which are distributed according to their aligned ideologies in the 2023 municipal elections:

Current distribution of the Bilbao City Council
EAJ-PNV (12); EH Bildu (6); PSE-EE PSOE (5); PP (4); EP (2)
Candidacy	Top candidate	Votes	%	Seats
Basque Nationalist Party (EAJ-PNV)	Juan Mari Aburto	54 445	36.58	12
Euskal Herria Bildu (EH Bildu)	María del Río Pereda	28 124	18.89	6
Socialist Party of the Basque Country–Basque Country Left (PSE-EE)	Nora Abete García	24 356	16.36	5
People's Party of the Basque Country (PP)	Esther Martínez Fernández	17 950	12.06	4
Elkarrekin Podemos (EP)	Ana Viñals Blanco	11 871	7.97	2

== Municipal areas and entities served ==
=== Areas ===
- Circulation & Transport
- Urbanism & Environment
- Culture & Education
- Works & Services
- Human Resources
- Safety
- Citizen Relation
- Social action
- Economy & Tax
- Tourism & Party
- Euskera
- Equality & Cooperation
- Employment, Youth & Sport
- Health & Consumption
- Participation & District Councils
- Public spaces

=== Entities ===
- Azkuna Zentroa: Cultural and sports center.
- Surbisa: Municipal agency for urban rehabilitation.
- Municipal Housing: Municipal housing service.
- Artxanda Funicular: Means of transportation to Mount Archanda.
- Cimubisa: Municipal computer service.
- Lan Ekintza Bilbao: Municipal agency for economic promotion.
- Bilbao Kirolak: Society for the management of sports activities, facilities and services.
- Teatro Arriaga: Municipal theater.
- Bilbao Musika: Organization that manages the Municipal School of Music, the Municipal Band of Txistularis and the Municipal Band of Music of Bilbao.
- Bilbao Arte: Foundation for the promotion of art.
- Bilbao Servicios: Manages municipal markets and funeral services.

== International recognition ==
The annual reports by Transparency International pointed out in 2008, 2009, and 2010, that the City Council was the most "transparent" in Spain in terms of institutional communication, citizen relations, services, public works, and the economy.

In 2010, Bilbao was awarded the Lee Kuan Yew World City Prize, in recognition of the City Council's leadership.

== See also ==
- Joaquín Rucoba

== Bibliography ==
- Gobierno Vasco. "Archivo de resultados electorales".
- Ministerio del Interior. "Resultados electorales". Archived from the original on 30 June 2010.
