= Aste Nagusia =

Main festival of Bilbao, Spain

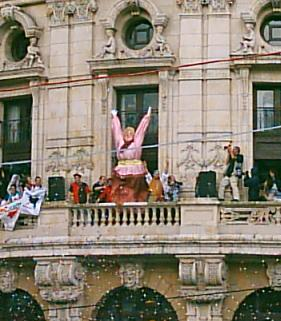
- Marijaia in Teatro Arriaga, 2005
- Type: Cultural
- Significance: Assumption of Mary
- Celebrations: Parties
- Date: Nine days starting the first Saturday after 15 August
- 2025 date: 16–24 August
- 2026 date: 22–30 August
- 2027 date: 21–29 August
- 2028 date: 19–27 August
- Frequency: Annual

Aste Nagusia or "The Great Week" (Basque: Bilboko Aste Nagusia, Spanish: Semana Grande de Bilbao) is the main festival of Bilbao, Basque Country, Spain, which is celebrated annually over 9 days beginning on the first Saturday following 15 August, the festivity of the Assumption of Our Lady.

== History ==
The Great Week has been held annually since 1978, and the August celebrations already coincided with the visit of the circus to the city, the fairgrounds, the bullfights, the boxing matches and the traditional dance performances. It is organized according to a particular organizational model between the comparsas or konpartsak (groups of citizens that, since 2002, are coordinated by the federation Bilboko Konpartsak) and the Bilbao City Council. The origin of this model was the organization of a contest of ideas by the department store El Corte Inglés – through Kiko Mochales – for the festival, which was awarded with a monetary prize of a hundred thousand pesetas, in order to introduce a new participatory model that would revitalise the backwards festival that had been established during Francoism. The competition was won by the project presented by Txomin Barullo, currently one of the pioneer festival groups of Bilbao, and consisted of a shared organization between the Council and the konpartsak, festive troupes from the different districts of Bilbao which represent different contemporary socio-political sensibilities in the city.

The first event of the festival is the chupinazo (Basque: txupinazo), the release of a signal rocket, also known as the first bang, which has taken place since 2001 from the balcony of the Teatro Arriaga. This includes the first rocket launched by the txupinera, and the reading of the festival proclamation by the herald.

In 1980, the then Mayor Jon Castañares (from the Basque Nationalist Party) decided that the council would organize the Great Week on their own. As a result of the boycott of the festival groups, which decided in response not to install their festive tents, known as txosnas, nor to participate in any event, the council withdrew their model, and the festival week of 1981 resumed the collaborative model from 1978.

In 1983, the Aste Nagusia had to be suspended due to severe flooding caused by the overflow of the Nervion-Ibaizabal.

On July 2, 2009, the festival was chosen in a popular vote organized by The International Bureau of Cultural Capitals as one of the 10+2 Intangible Cultural Heritage Treasures of Spain, ranking first.

The festival was cancelled in 2020 and 2021 due to the COVID-19 pandemic.

Fire bulls of are part of the La Semana Grande of San Sebastián.

== Groups ==
Short video about the popular festivities of Bilbao. English subtitles available.

The festival groups, known as comparsas (konpartsak in Basque), are the heart of the Aste Nagusia of Bilbao. Created with the festival model of 1978, they are troupes of people that come together to energize the festival through the "txosnas" or festive tents they install in the El Arenal fairground, with music and different activities during the nine days of the Aste Nagusia.

They are associated to different political, social, sport or neighbourhood interests.

In addition to energizing the Aste Nagusia in August, the konpartsak also invigorate the Carnival festivities in February/March and the Santo Tomás Fair on 21 December. Currently there are 28 troupes, and the longest-running are Bizizaleak, Hontzak, Pinpilinpauxa, Satorrak, Tintigorri, Txomin Barullo and Uribarri.

== The txupinera and the herald ==
The chupinera or txupinera is responsible for launching the rocket that announces the beginning of the festival from the balcony of the Teatro Arriaga. Each year, she is chosen from the female members of the festival troupe that has been elected in a draw organized by the Coordination of Comparsas, which does not consider the troupes already favored in previous years. The txupinera is accompanied in the balcony by the pregonero or herald, a prominent figure from or associated with Bilbao who reads the festival proclamation.

In 1981, besides the first bang, the txupinera was entrusted with the task of launching another rocket every day of the festival at seven in the morning. In that year, given the significant increase in her work, a "reserve" txupinera was chosen, which corresponded to the group Kezkalariak, not being repeated since as not considered necessary.

In 1983, with the intention of giving greater prominence to the position, the sculptor José Angel Lasa designed in oak wood the hanger for the rocket, knows as the botafuego, as well as the makila walking stick, in sign of authority, pertaining to their office. They are kept in the City Hall and are handed by the outgoing txupinera to the newly elected one every year.

In 1985, the Coordination of Comparsas covered the cost of a specific uniform for the position, designed by Alejandro Gutiérrez. It consists of a red tunic with large shoulder pads, with bright black collar, epaulets and a double row of gold buttons; worsted black skirt, tubed; red beret with the Coat of arms of Bilbao embroidery, and black patent leather shoes with white socks. The uniform of the txupinera has similarities with the Carlist uniform from the troops that besieged and bombarded during the first Siege of Bilbao, especially its characteristic red beret.

Throughout all the editions of Aste Nagusia, the txupineras and heralds were the following:

Year	Txupinera	Herald
1978	Ana Isabel Arceniega (Araba Etxea group)	Adiskideak and Atxuritarrok groups
1979	María Jesús Aguirregoitia (Uribarri group)	Etxetxua and Atxuritarrok groups
1980	—N/a	Jon Castañares (Mayor)
1981	Montse Valerio (Kaixo group)	Juan Jesus Fernandez de Retana
1982	Anabel Fernández (Moskotarrak group)	Josu Torre
1983	Alazne Olabarrieta (Mamiki group)	Iñigo Liceranzu
1984	María Ascensión Cruces (Txintxarri group)	Txema Noriega
1985	María Luisa Crespo (Intxausti group)	Amalia Iglesias
1986	Manoli Cruces (Gautxoriak group)	Natxo de Felipe
1987	Magdalena Landa (Ardoa Barrura group)	Fernando Egileor
1988	Itziar Pagalday (Zaratarrak group)	Members of the 1978 inaugural festival committee
1989	Eva Dolado (Bizizaleak group)	Boni Fernandez
1990	Itxaso Goti (Kaskagorri group)	Jon Lopategi
1991	Miren Barrutia (Hau Pittu Hau! group)	Pello Zubiria
1992	Txelo Martínez (Tximitxurri group)	Marino Lejarreta
1993	Nerea Ahedo (Adiskideak group)	Alfonso Irigoien
1994	Josune Bañales (Gogorregi group)	José Ángel Iribar
1995	Sandra Guzman (Hontzak group)	Julian Fernandez
1996	Arantza de Jesús (Hor Dago! group)	Alicia Carreño
1997	Soni Charcan (Aixe Berri group)	Unai Iturriaga
1998	Sonia Villamor (Kobetas Mendi group)	José María Arrate
1999	Arantza Garbayo (Pa... Ya! group)	Irkus Robles-Arangiz
2000	Aitziber Zalbide (Lehoiak group)	Loli Astoreka
2001	Berta García (Irrintzi group)	Gaztedi dance ensemble
2002	Lurdes Luke (Satorrak group)	Bilbao Basket basketball team
2003	Maite Pérez (Pinpilinpauxa group)	Fishermen from Biscay
2004	Begoña Benedicto (Askapeña group)	Julio Ibarra
2005	Aitziber Adell Ateca (Tintigorri group)	Juanjo San Sebastian
2006	Marta Gerrikabeitia (Sinkuartel group)	Mariví Bilbao
2007	Larraitz Cisneros (Altxaporrue group)	Kepa Junkera
2008	Isabel Isazelaia (Algara group)	Aitor Elizegi
2009	Sonia Polo (Eguzkizaleak group)	Joseba Solozabal
2010	Aratz Irazabal (Txinbotarrak group)	Isidro Elezgarai
2011	Patricia Lezama (Mekauen group)	Kirmen Uribe
2012	Nerea Orizaola (Zaratas group)	Virginia Berasategui
2013	Jone Artola (Txori Barrote group)	Iraia Iturregi (Athletic Club Femenino captain)
2014	Loreto Errasti (Piztiak group)	Asier Garcia (Bidaideak BSR wheelchair basketball team captain)
2015	Oihana Pascual (Txomin Barullo group)	Gurutze Beitia
2016	Gisèle Felli (Komantxe group)	Patxo Telleria
2017	Ane Ortiz (Askapeña group)	Nati Ovelleiro (Welcome Refugees platform member)
2018	Saioa Domínguez (Aixe Berri group)	Zorion Egileor
2019	Itsasne Núñez (Pa... Ya! group)	Bea Sever (Naizen Association for Families of Transgender Kids spokesperson)
2022	Iratxe Palacios (Tintigorri group)	Itziar Lazkano
2023	Izaskun Pinedo (Pinpilinpauxa group)	Aiora Renteria (Zea Mays band's singer)
2024	Nagore Uguarte (Txinbotarrak group)	Itziar Ituño (actress & singer)
2025	Olatz Agirre (Txori Barrote group)	Francis Díez (Doctor Deseo band's singer)

== Marijaia ==
Since 1978, the Marijaia ("Mary-festival") character is the official symbol of the festival, and since 1997, she has her own song, known as Badator Marijaia, composed by Kepa Junkera, with lyrics by Basque writer Edorta Jiménez.

Marijaia is characterised as a portable structure in the shape of a plump lady with her arms always raised in celebration. She was created on August 19, 1978, by Mari Puri Herrero, who designed and built it in just five days, after the commission of the Festival Committee.

== Music ==
Concerts are an important part of the Great Week. The official program has included concerts by artists such as Ainhoa Cantalapiedra, Alpha Blondy, Amaral, Ana Torroja, Andy & Lucas, Antonio Orozco, Asian Dub Foundation, Augustus Pablo, Baccara, Barón Rojo, Basque Dub Foundation, Benito Lertxundi, Berri Txarrak, Burning Spear, Carlinhos Brown, Carlos Núñez, Carmen París, Chambao, Chenoa, Chico y Chica, Coldplay, Coti, Dani Martín, Diego Martín, Doctor Deseo, Dover, Egan, El Arrebato, Earth Wind and Fire, El Consorcio, El Mentón de Foggarty, Fangoria, Fito & Fitipaldis, Fundación Tony Manero, Gari, Gatibu, Guano Apes, Hiru Truku, Hombres G, Iggy Pop and The Stooges, Iguana Tango, Ismael Serrano, Jeanette, Jorge Drexler, Juan Magán, Juanes, Karina, Ken Zazpi, Kepa Junkera, La Otxoa, La Mala Rodríguez, La 5ª Estación, La sonrisa de Julia, Liam O'Flynn, Los Del Río, Luar na Lubre, M Clan, Mägo de Oz, Mano Negra, Manu Chao, Marlango, Melendi, Merche Micky, Miguel Bosé, Morodo, Negu Gorriak, Nena Daconte, OBK, Orishas, Pennywise, Pereza, Pet Shop Boys, Pignoise, Potato, Primal Scream, Public Enemy, Reincidentes, Ruper Ordorika, Safri Duo, Santiago Auserón, Sebastián Yatra, Septeto Santiaguero, Sergio Dalma, Simple Minds, Ska-P, Sólo los Solo, Su ta Gar, The Pogues, The Prodigy, Tony Ronald, Tote King, Travis, Turbonegro, Urtz, Violadores del Verso, among others.

Apart from the concerts in the official program, the private initiative – mainly from the festival groups and the hospitality industry – also organize alternative concerts, by artists such of Banda Bassotti, Geronación, La Otxoa, Macarrada, Skalariak, Su ta Gar, El Reno Renardo, among others.

== Fireworks ==
During the festival, the Villa de Bilbao International Fireworks Competition is held; each night a pyrotechnic company shows a program. The festival is closed by an exhibition program.
