= Duñabeitia =

Duñabeitia is a Basque surname. Notable people with the surname include:

- Alberto Duñabeitia (1900–1980), Spanish footballer
- Jesús María Duñabeitia (1929–2013), Spanish politician
- Kosme Duñabeitia (1819–1890), Basque photographer and painter
