= Justo Somonte Iturrioz =

Mayor of Bilbao
- In office 1 October 1923 – 26 February 1924
- Preceded by: Mariano Arostegui Ugarriza
- Succeeded by: Federico Moyúa Salazar

Personal details
- Born: 15 August 1891 Bilbao, Spain
- Died: 14 February 1954 (aged 62) Mexico City, Mexico
- Party: PSOE
- Occupation: Pharmacist, politician

Military service
- Unit: Euzko Gudarostea
- Battles/wars: Spanish Civil War

Justo Diego Somonte Iturrioz (15 August 1891 - 14 February 1954) was a Spanish pharmacist and politician who served as the mayor of Bilbao from 1923 to 1924.

== Biography ==
Somonte Iturrioz came from a family of pharmacists. Farmacia Pariza, a local pharmacy, was founded by his grandfather Justo Somonte Martínez, who was awarded by the Bilbao City Council with the title Ilustres bilbaínos y bilbaínas (lit. 'Illustrious Bilbao person') in 2007.

Somonte Iturrioz presided over the Spanish Socialist Workers' Party in Bilbao and was mayor of the city for five months, starting from 1 October 1923, succeeding Mariano Arostegui Ugarriza, until February 26, 1924, when he was dismissed by the dictatorship of Primo de Rivera and replaced by Federico Moyúa Salazar.

During the Second Spanish Republic, he participated in the Revolution of 1934 and had to go into exile in France. When the Spanish Civil War broke out, he was appointed by the Basque government as the head of health in the north and the political commissar of Euzko Gudarostea. Later, he was also commissioner of various logistics units in Catalonia. After the war, he embarked on his way to Mexico in exile, he arrived in Veracruz on 27 July 1939. In Mexico, he worked in laboratories and founded an asphalt factory.
