= Teatro Arriaga =

Opera house in Bilbao, Spain

Coordinates: 43°15′34″N 2°55′30″W

Arriaga Theatre
- Teatro Arriaga; Arriaga antzokia
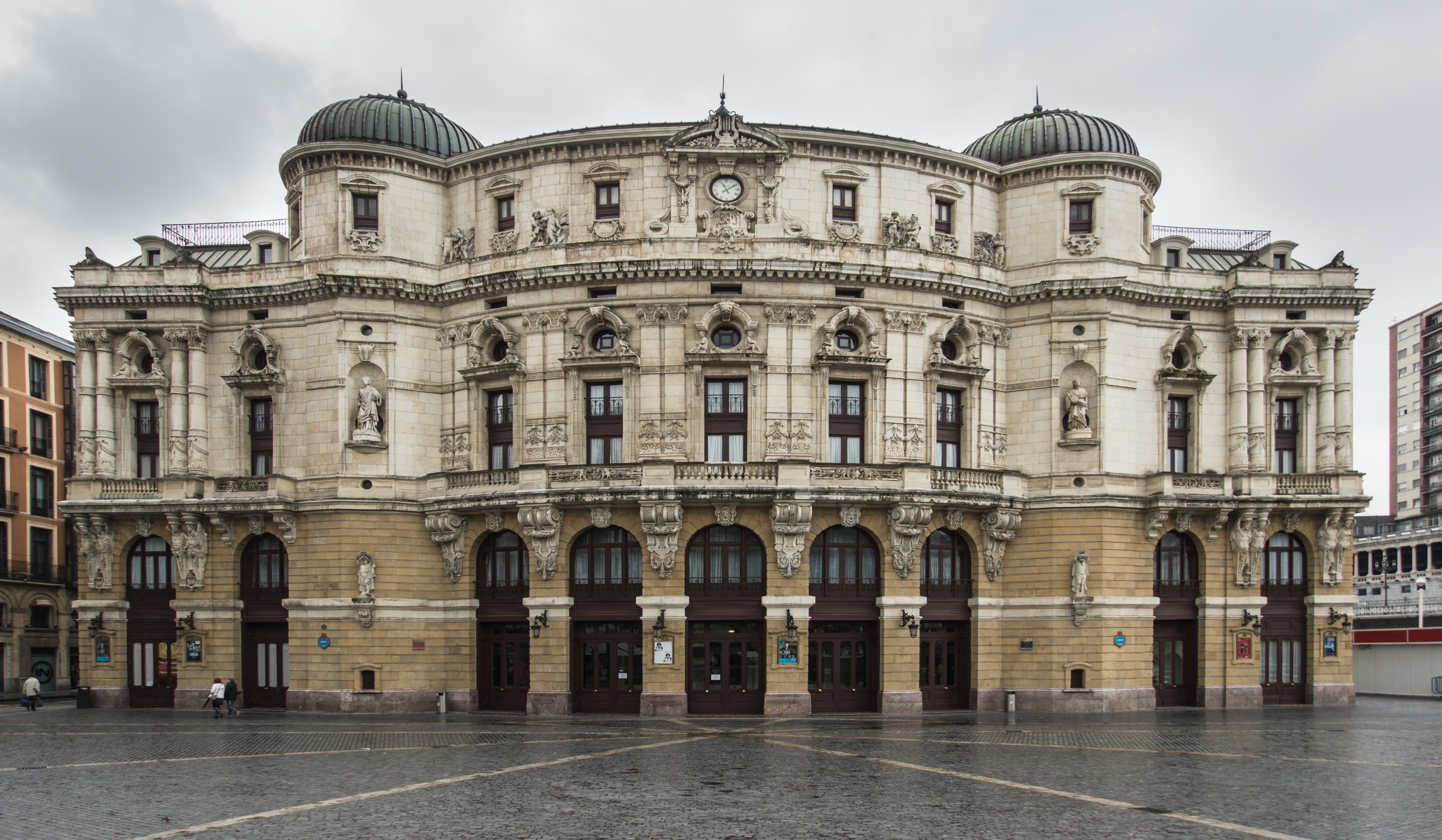
- Interactive map of Arriaga Theatre
- Location: Bilbao, Spain
- Type: Opera house
- Public transit: Abando; Arriaga; Bilbao-Abando

Construction
- Opened: 31 May 1890
- Architect: Joaquín Rucoba

The Teatro Arriaga, or Arriaga Antzokia in Basque, is an opera house located on the Nervión River in Bilbao, Spain. It was built in Neo-Baroque style by architect Joaquín Rucoba in 1890, the same architect that built the city hall. It is named after Juan Crisóstomo de Arriaga, known in his time as the "Spanish Mozart."

The theatre has endured multiple disasters, including a fire and a flood, leading to two major reconstructions.

== History ==
=== Town Theatre ===
In 1834, the Teatro de la Villa opened in Bilbao as the city's primary venue for stage performances. The city saw substantial population growth in the mid-19th century following the arrival of the railroad. During this time, the Carlist Wars caused considerable damage to the city, and left the theatre in a ruinous state. The size and condition of the Teatro de la Villa were no longer suitable for the city, and in 1882, plans were made to construct a new theatre to replace it.

=== New Theatre ===
Led by architect Joaquín Rucoba, the Nuevo Teatro de Bilbao was inaugurated on May 31, 1890, after four years of construction. The new theatre was first called "Teatro Arriaga" in the newspaper announcements for a performance in 1902, in honor of the Spanish Basque composer, Juan Crisóstomo Arriaga.

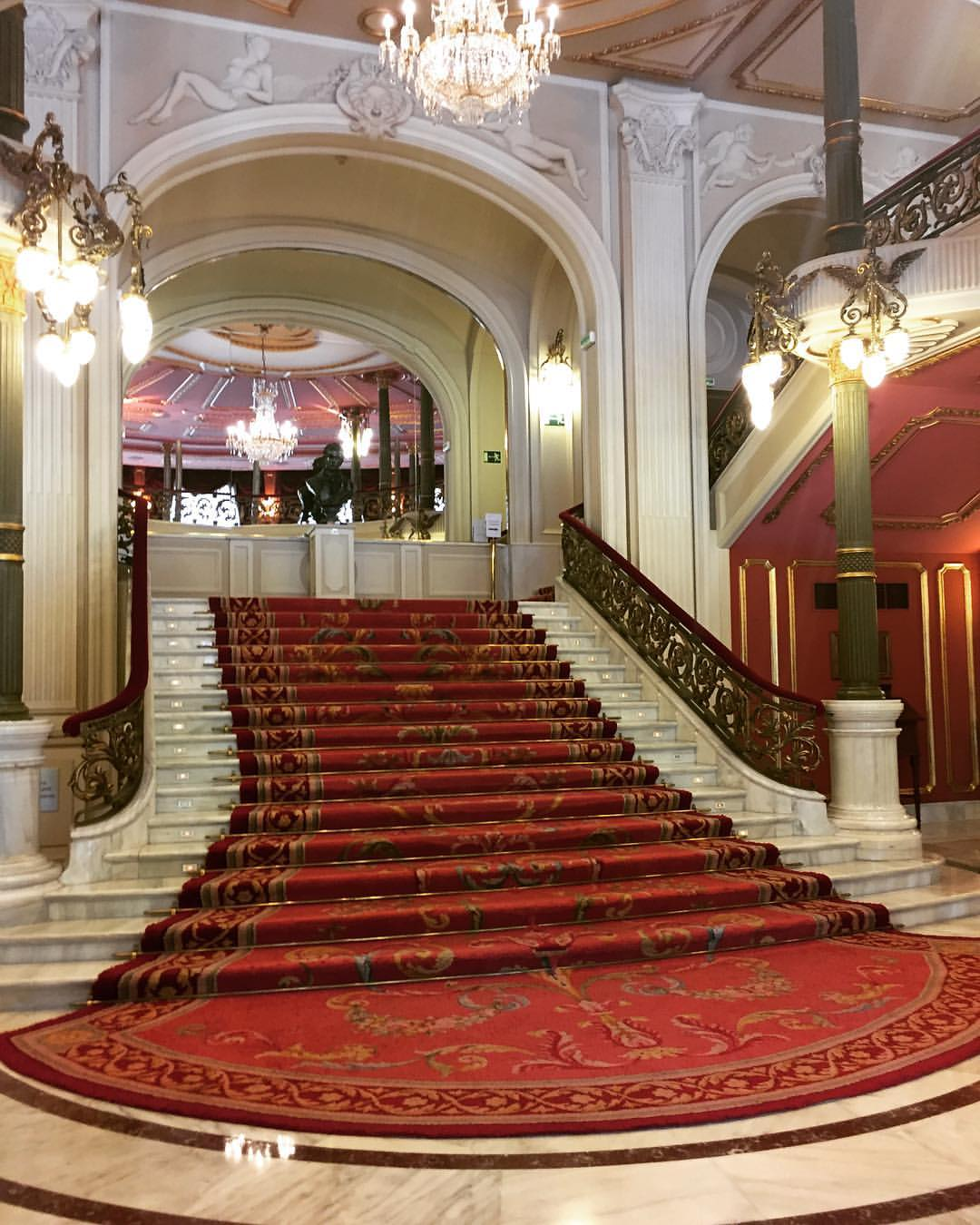
Teatro Arriaga Imperial Staircase

=== Reconstruction ===
On the night of the Santo Tomás Market in 1914, the theatre was destroyed by a fire. Reconstruction was led by architect Federico de Ugalde, and the theatre was inaugurated for the second time on June 5, 1919.

On Friday, August 26, 1983, Bilbao suffered flooding caused by heavy rainfall. Water levels reached a height of five meters, damaging much of the city, including the Teatro Arriaga. The theatre reopened on December 5, 1986, following a major restoration that included the addition of the imperial staircase. The project was led by architect Francisco Hurtado de Saracho.

=== Façade Restoration ===
Between 1999 and 2000, the façades of the Teatro Arriaga underwent major restoration due to deterioration. The building materials had been significantly damaged by salts, biological growth, pollution, and moisture.The stonework and sculptures showed flaking, discoloration, and structural damage. During the restoration, surfaces were cleaned, mineral paints were applied to restore finishes, damaged sculptural elements were reinforced, and deteriorated joints and mortars were replaced.

== Features ==
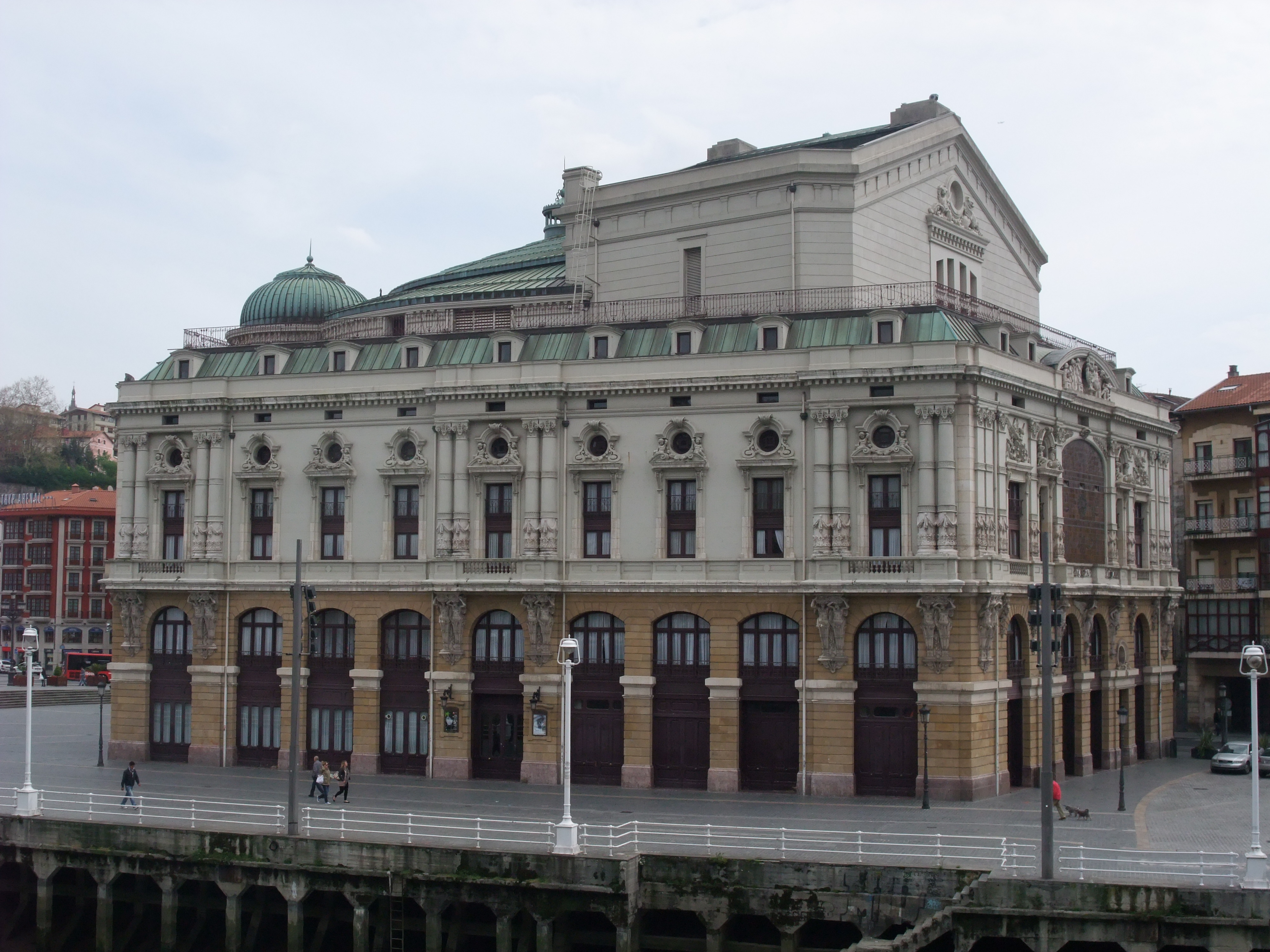
Side of Teatro Arriaga

=== Exterior ===
The building is designed in a Neo-Baroque style with French influences. Its façades are inspired by the Paris Opera House and feature elaborate ornamentation and sculptural decoration. Similar to the Paris Opera House, the sculptures represent allegories of the performing arts. The main façade has a curved-convex form framed by two domed turrets and is organized into three levels. The base level has a series of arches; the second level includes rectangular windows, decorative oculi, and balconies; and the third level has a centrally positioned clock between rectangular windows. The main façade is built from sandstone and several types of limestone, while the side and rear façades are made of brick covered with mortars and paints that imitate stone. Decorative elements are made of limestone or molded stucco.

=== Interior ===
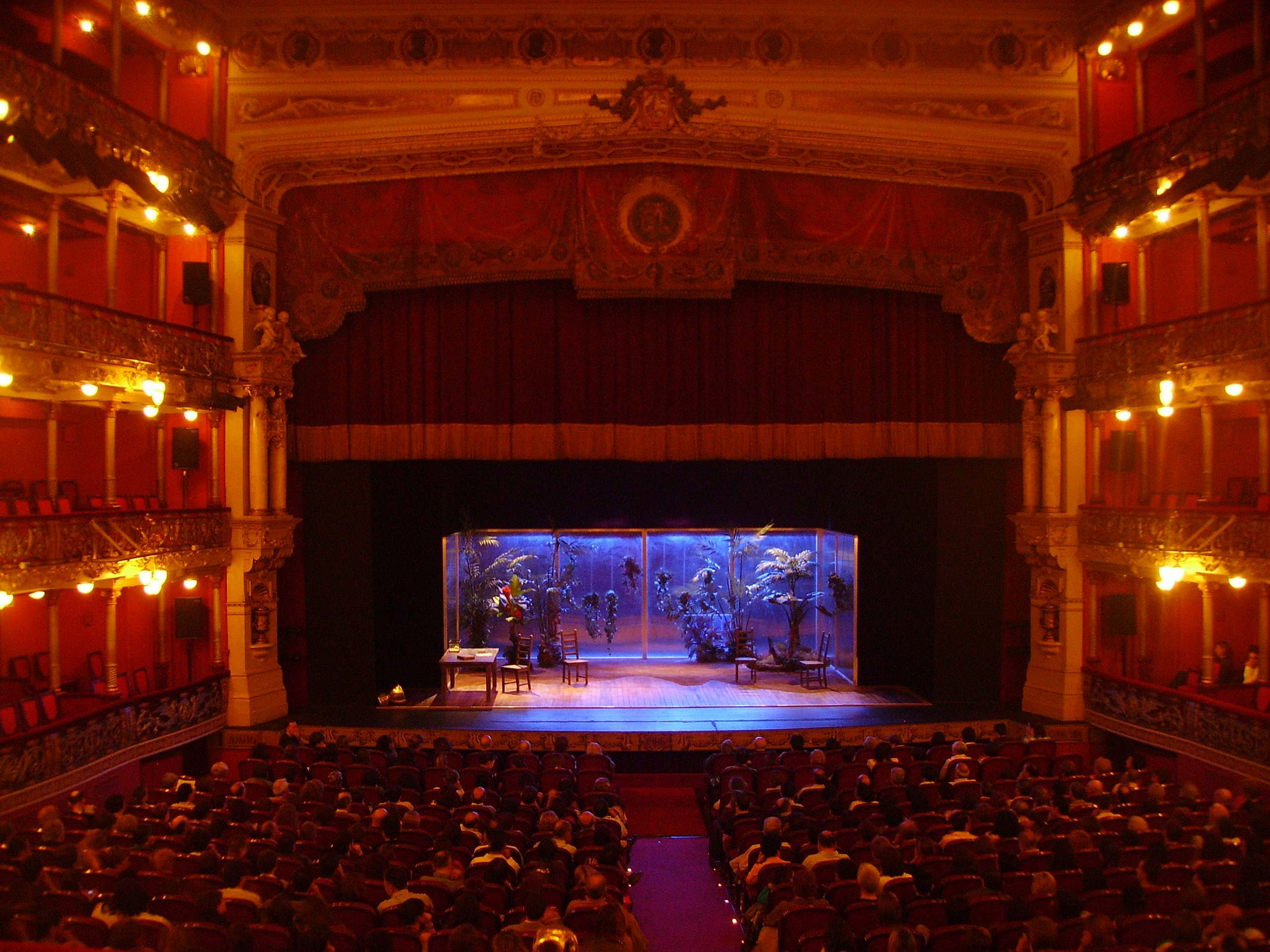
Performance at Teatro Arriaga

The auditorium can seat 1200 people and is divided into five areas: stalls, orchestra, boxes, amphitheater, and gallery. It follows a horseshoe plan, similar to other European opera houses. In the original design of the Arriaga, the ground floor was occupied with commercial spaces and shops. Consequently, the stage is located on the second floor. The orchestra pit sits on an elevator platform with three possible configurations. At its lowest position, it serves as the orchestra pit. It can be raised to align with the stalls level and provide additional seating, or be elevated further to the stage level, serving as a stage extension. The stage has one red guillotine curtain, one red American curtain, and two black harlequin curtains.

=== Technology ===
The Arriaga was considered technologically advanced at the time it was originally constructed. The building was an early adopter of electrical lighting, and it was designed with an iron structure in hopes of avoiding fire.

=== Sustainable Theatre ===
Today, the Arriaga is committed to reducing its environmental impact and promoting sustainability. Since 2023, the theatre has followed the guidelines and protocols of the Theatre Green Book, focusing on:

==== Eco-friendly Materials ====
- Stage sets are designed with environmentally friendly materials
- Reuse of existing materials and accessories is prioritized

==== Energy Efficiency ====
- Lights are switched off when not in use
- Heating, cooling, and electrical equipment systems are operated efficiently
- Natural lighting and ventilation are used whenever possible

==== Waste Reduction ====
- Waste is separated and recycled in all areas
- The use of paper is kept to a minimum

== See also ==
- List of opera houses
