= Anbotto Dorrea =

Skyscraper in Bilbao, Spain

Tower Anboto
- Anbotto Dorrea (Spanish)
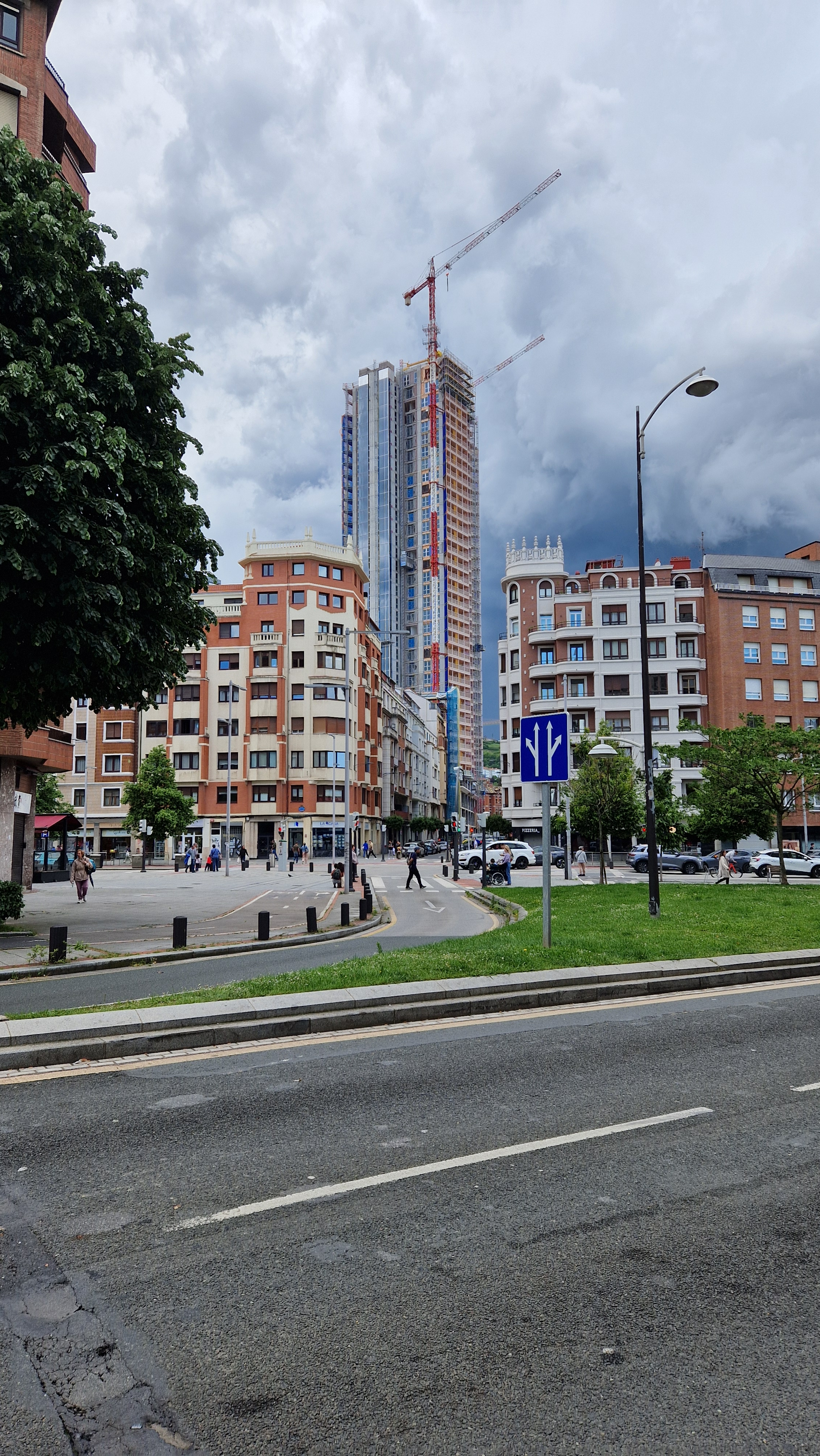
- Anboto Dorrea in May 2026
- Interactive map of the Tower Anboto area
- Former names: Operación Garellano I

General information
- Status: Under construction
- Type: Mixed-use: Residential/Commercial
- Location: 12 Luis Briñas, Bilbao, Spain
- Coordinates: 43.260431°N 2.949454°W
- Construction started: 2020
- Completed: 2026

Height
- Architectural: 119 m (390 ft)

Technical details
- Floor count: 36
- Floor area: 7,957 m^{2} (85,650 sq ft)
- Lifts/elevators: 3

Design and construction
- Architects: Rogers Stirk Harbour + Partners; Luis Vidal
- Developer: Arrasate Investments and Services SA
- Main contractor: Dragados

Website
- Anboto Dorrea

Anboto Dorrea is a mixed-use high-rise building under construction in Bilbao, Spain, as part of the Garellano complex. Groundbroken in 2020 and scheduled for completion in 2026, the tower will stand at 119 m (390 ft) tall with 36 floors and will be the second tallest building in Bilbao.

== History ==
The building is situated next to the underground Bilbao Intermodal Station, the building is very close to Basurto Hospital, San Mamés Stadium, the Bilbao School of Engineering, and the new Faculty of Medicine and Nursing of the University of the Basque Country (UPV-EHU), whose relocation from Lejona is planned for 2026/2027. It is the ninth building and the fifth and final tower of the complex.

Its construction consists of two phases. In the first phase, begun in September 2020 by the construction company Dragados (ACS Group), the foundations were laid for the land on which the building would be located. Once this was completed, construction of the tower began, undertaken by Construcciones Urrutia, with full completion scheduled for November 2024, and the keys handed over by the end of that year. When finished, it will be the second tallest building in the Basque Country after the Iberdrola Tower and the tallest residential building in the region.

The tower, which has 166 market-rate apartments, 239 parking spaces, 166 storage units and a shopping center, is designed by the prestigious British architecture firm Rogers Stirk Harbour + Partners (RSHP).

In February 2023, construction was halted due to rising costs, after which Construcciones Urrutia abandoned the project. On April 27, the assembly selected the Biscayan company Vusa to complete the tower.

In early April 2024, the building reached its maximum height in Garellano, reaching 119 meters with its 36 constructed floors, thus becoming the tallest residential skyscraper in the Basque Country.

On February 8, 2025, it was reported that the Garellano residential tower was stalled again and delayed once more until at least 2026.

=== Garellano project ===
Garellano is one of the areas that has undergone the most significant transformation in Bilbao 's new urban redevelopment plan. The project by the Rogers Stirk Harbour + Partners team, led by Richard Rogers, was selected for the design of the eight-unit housing complex in Garellano, which culminates with the construction of the Anboto Dorrea. Their selection was made by a jury composed of members of the Bilbao City Council, the Bilbao Ría 2000 company, the Basque Government, and architects specializing in urban planning, from among five shortlisted projects. These shortlisted projects were those of the teams Carlos Ferrater/Luis Domínguez, Junquera Arquitectos SLP, MVRDV/IA+B, Suárez & Santas Arquitectos, and the aforementioned project led by Richard Rogers.

=== Design ===
Once the final design was presented at the end of October 2019, and after the Anboto Dorrea project underwent two modifications compared to the original, its owners expressed their disagreement with what had not been planned or purchased from the original plans, pointing the finger at both the developer Arrasate and the Richard Rogers architecture studio.

=== Construction ===
On March 8, 2023, it was announced that work had been halted since February of that year. The cooperative members terminated their contract with the construction company and finalized the resumption of work with another firm. Construcciones Urrutia stopped construction because it could not pay its subcontractors after rising costs.

On March 24, it was reported that the construction company working on the halted Garellano tower was removing its scaffolding and preparing to leave. The developers continued working to find another company to take over the project, which could become more expensive again. On April 4, the construction company finally abandoned the site, coinciding with the news that the same company, Construcciones Urrutia, had also halted construction on another 36 homes in the Santutxu neighborhood of Bilbao, next to the Ángeles Custodios School.

On April 22, it was reported in the press that four firms, including Sacyr and Dragados, were vying to complete the Garellano tower, and that after the bids were submitted, the cooperative members would decide in an assembly on April 27 which one they would choose. Finally, the Biscayan company Vusa was selected to finish the construction.

On February 8, 2025, it was reported in the press that the Garellano residential tower project was stalled again and delayed once more until at least 2026.

== Facilities ==
The Anboto Dorrea development will consist of 5 basement levels with 239 parking spaces and 166 storage units, a tower with the first 3 floors (0, 1, 2) dedicated to commercial facilities, a 3rd floor with communal facilities (gym, social club, swimming pool, sauna, solarium and children's playground) and 32 floors for a total of 166 cooperative housing units.

The apartments at Anboto Dorrea will feature high-quality fixtures, an efficient layout, and exterior rooms offering abundant natural light and city views. They will also include 2 or 3 bedrooms, spacious terraces of up to 26 m^{2}, double-glazed windows separated by an insulating air gap, and excellent sound insulation. Heating will be provided by a water-based underfloor heating system using aerothermal energy. In addition, all apartments will have a home automation system that includes: intrusion alarm, fire alarm, power outage alert, climate control, and remote telephone control. The building will have an A energy rating.

== Gallery ==
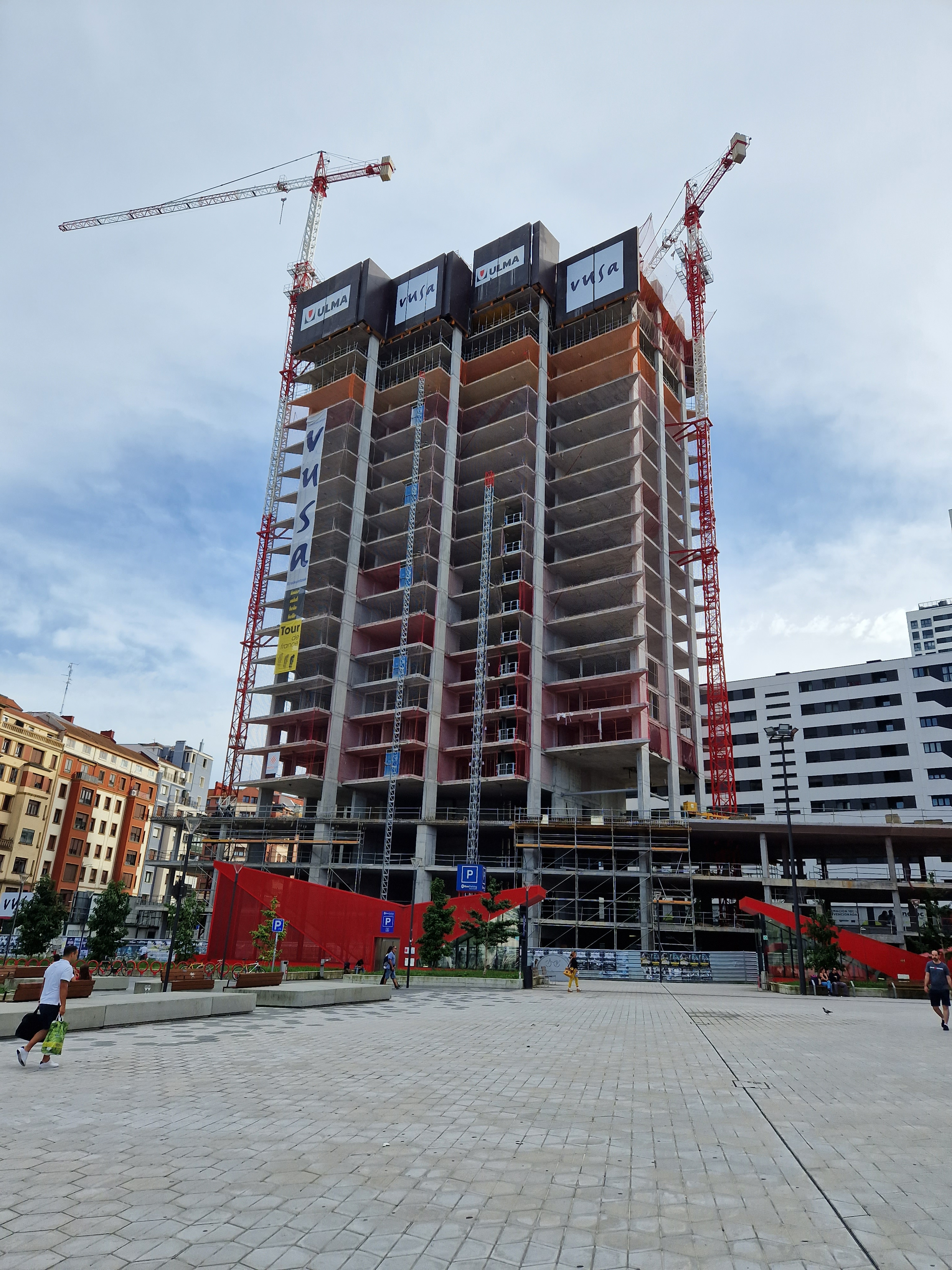
The tower under construction in September 2023

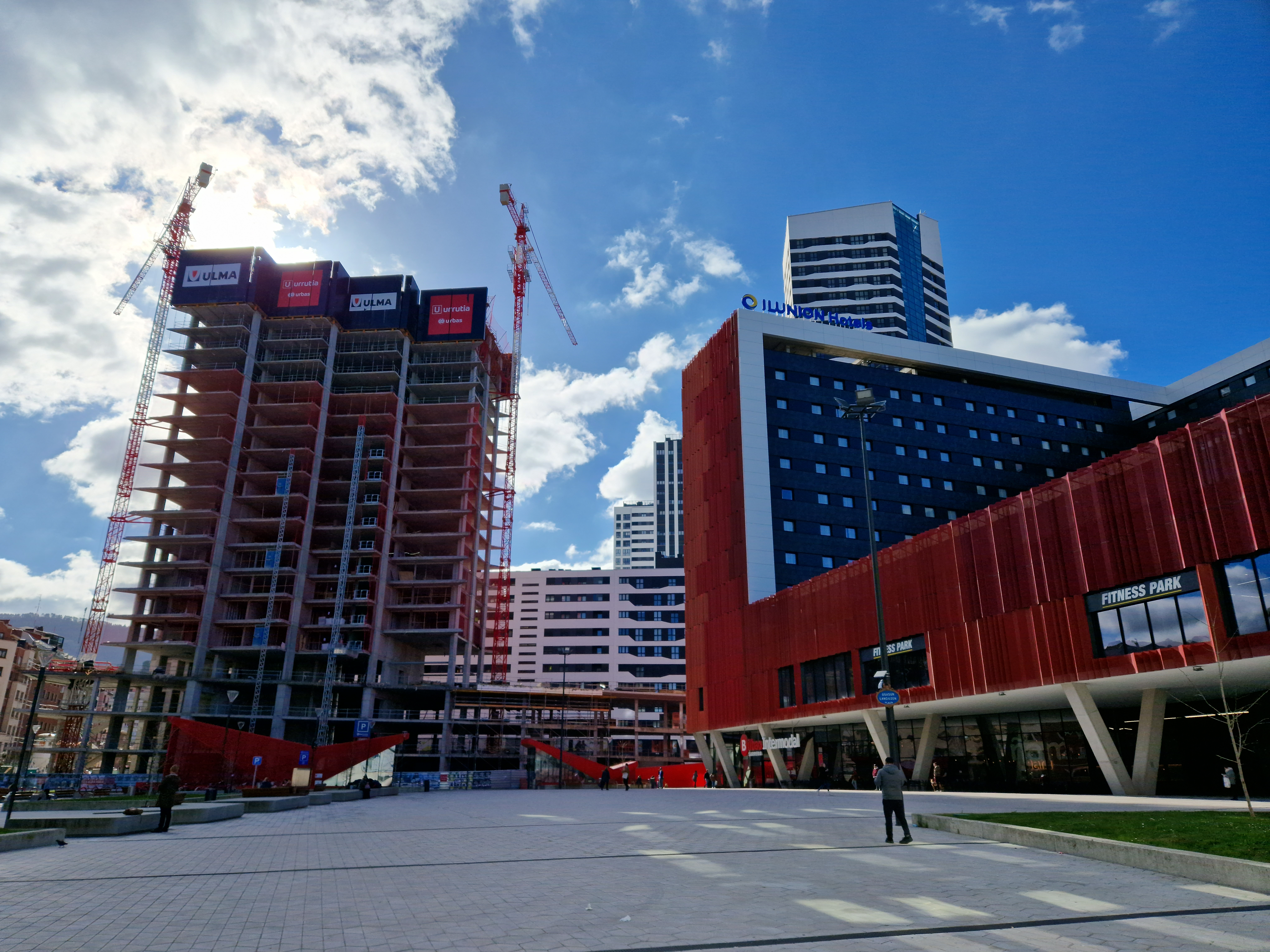
The tower seen from the Calle Luis Brinas

== See also ==
- List of tallest buildings in Spain
