= Garellano =

Skyscraper complex in Bilbao, Spain

Garellano Complex
- Garellano grupo de viviendas (Spanish)
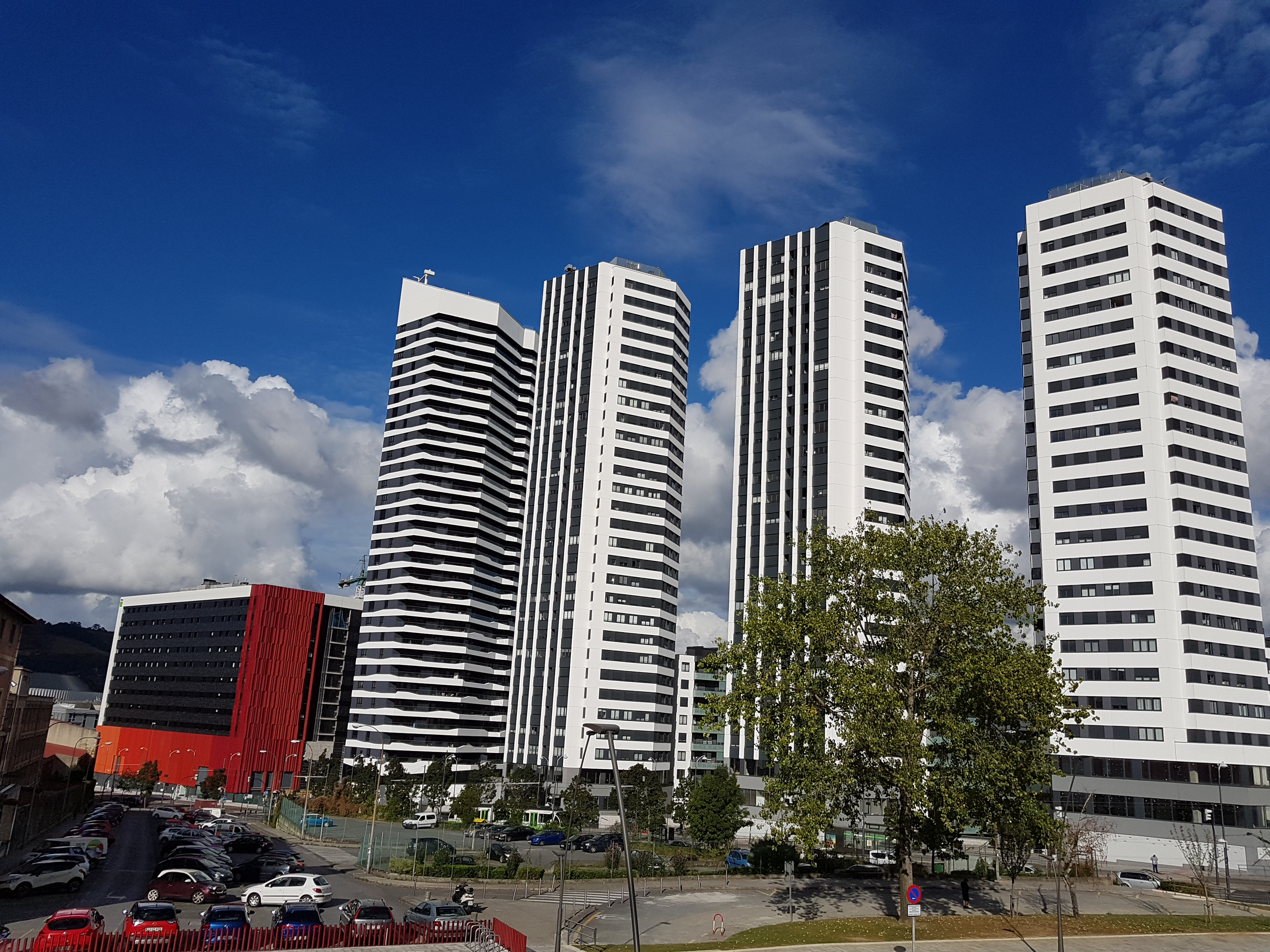
- Interactive map of the Garellano Complex area

General information
- Status: Completed
- Type: Residential
- Location: Gurtubay Kalea, Bilbao, Spain
- Coordinates: 43.26005°N 2.95132°W
- Construction started: 2012
- Completed: 2025

Height
- Roof: 119 m (390 ft) (tallest (Anbotto Dorrea)

Design and construction
- Architect: Rogers Stirk Harbour + Partners

The Garellano Complex also known as Operación Garellano or Dorre Barriak is a high-rise residential building development in the Basurto-Zorroza district of Bilbao, Spain. The complex consists of five main high-rise towers (Operación Garellano I–V), with the tallest standing at 119 m (390 ft).

== History ==
The site, which once housed a military barracks and later the headquarters of the Bilbao Municipal Police and Fire Department, is exceptional because of the urban development project led by British architect Richard Rogers.

The development area covers 58,675 square meters, of which 15% is reserved for open spaces and green areas. A total of nine residential blocks are planned, with heights of 6 (4 blocks), 24, 27, 30, 33, and 36 stories. Of the five planned towers, the last and tallest, named Anboto Dorrea, will be the second tallest building in the Basque Country and the tallest residential building.

== Project selection ==
The project by the team Rogers Stirk Harbour + Partners (RSHP), led by Richard Rogers, was chosen by a jury composed of members of the Bilbao City Council, the Bilbao Ría 2000 company, the Basque Government, and architects specializing in urban planning, from among five shortlisted projects. These projects were those of the teams Carlos Ferrater/Luis Domínguez, Junquera Arquitectos SLP, MVRDV/IA+B, Suárez & Santas Arquitectos, and the aforementioned project led by Richard Rogers.

- Carlos Ferrater/Luis Domínguez: the proposal defined a large block of similar height to the housing in the Ensanche and with an interior park.
- Junquera Arquitectos SLP: the project was characterized by open spaces and three blocks of a lower height than the adjacent buildings on which three skyscrapers were proposed.
- MVRDV/IA+B: Dutch architecture under the title of "Bilbao Blocks", which featured a tall stepped building, a large quadrangular building intended to be built on top of some of the existing buildings, and various public spaces.
- Suárez & Santas Arquitectos: this Bilbao-based studio proposed a large rectangular park flanked by four 25-story buildings and other medium-sized ones.

== Access ==
The Garellano area, along with the Plaza Circular in Bilbao, is one of the best-connected areas in the city. Within its perimeter are three tram stations (San Mamés, Hospital, and Basurto), one metro station, one Renfe Cercanías commuter rail station, and the Basurto FEVE station. In addition, there is the Bilbao Intermodal station.

== Buildings ==
Name	Image	Height m (ft)	Floors	Construction period	Ref
Anbotto Dorrea (Operación Garellano I)		119	36	2020–2026	
Bizkaia Dorrea (Operación Garellano II)		108	33	2012–2020	
Operación Garellano III		100	30	2012–2016	
Operación Garellano IV		92	28	2012–2015	
Operación Garellano V		82	24	2012–2015	

== See also ==
- List of tallest buildings in Spain
