= Ernesto Erkoreka Plaza =

Plaza in Bilbao, Biscay, Spain

- Plaza
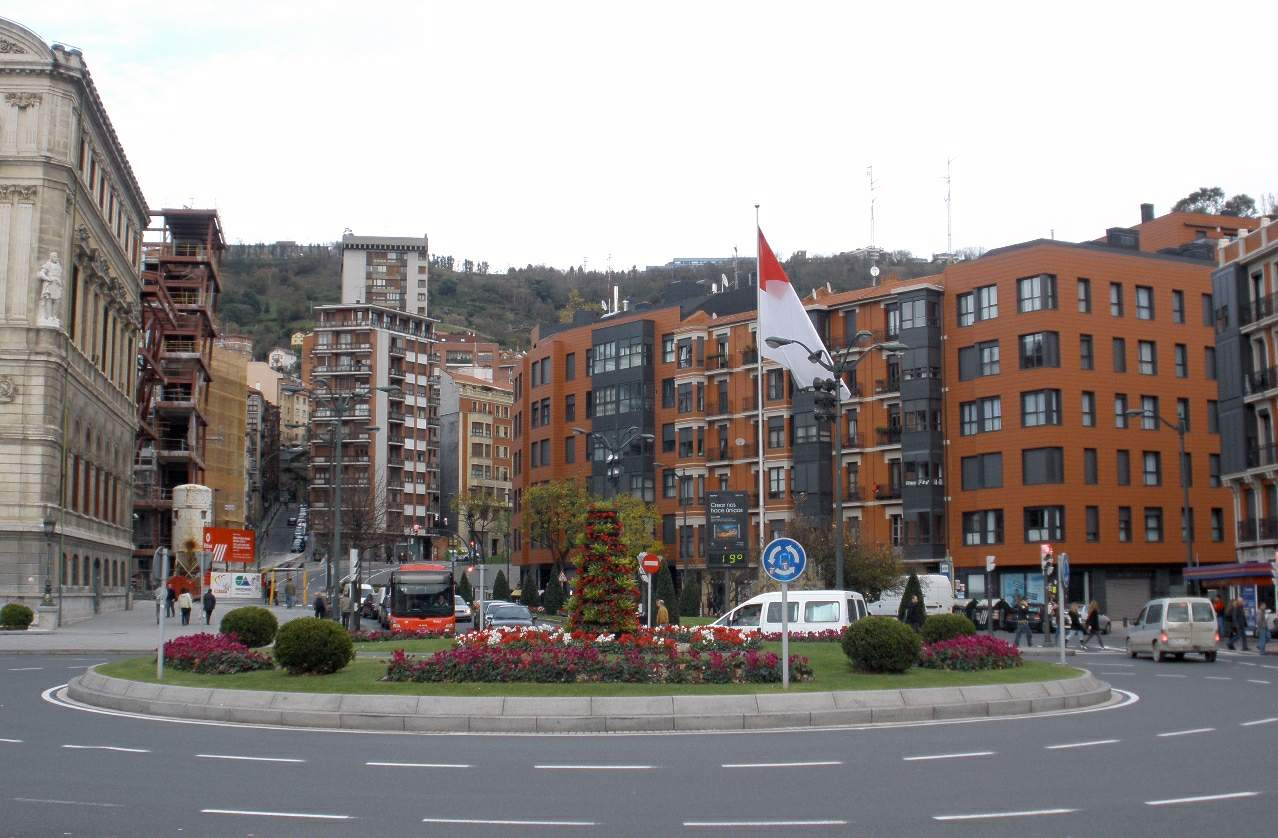
- Location: Bilbao, Spain
- Interactive map of Ernesto Erkoreka Plaza
- Coordinates: 43°15′49.16″N 2°55′23.56″W

Ernesto Erkoreka Plaza is a plaza in Bilbao, the capital of Biscay. It is located next to the Bilbao City Hall, at the intersection of the Campo Volantin promenade, the City Hall Bridge, Sendeja Street, and Zumalakarregi hiribidearen.

== History ==
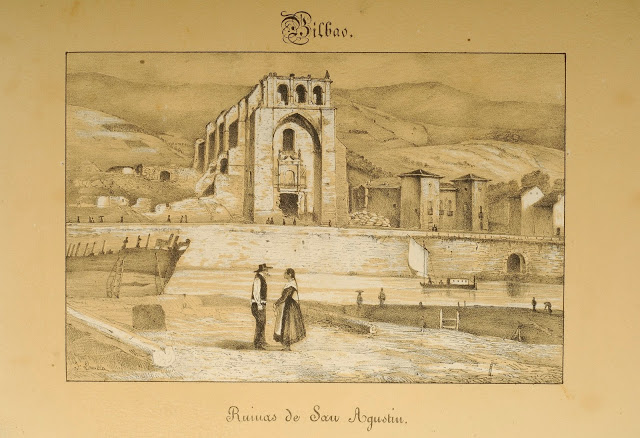
Convent of San Agustín

The city hall and the plaza were built in the location of the former convent of San Agustín, located on the banks of the estuary. The convent was destroyed during the First Carlist War and demolished the following years. In 1883, the government authorized the Bilbao City Council to use the location to build a new city hall, the council was previously based in Old Town.

The plaza was formerly known as Primo de Rivera plaza, its name was changed to Ernesto Erkoreka plaza on 4 June 1980, after Ernesto Erkoreka, former mayor of Bilbao and republican politician.

== Points of interest ==
The plaza houses several points of interest, including the Bilbao City Hall and the City Hall Bridge, as well the sculpture Esferaren desokupazioaren oboide aldaera by Jorge Oteiza.

- Bilbao City Hall
- City Hall Bridge
- Esferaren desokupazioaren oboide aldaera (Jorge Oteiza)

== Gallery ==
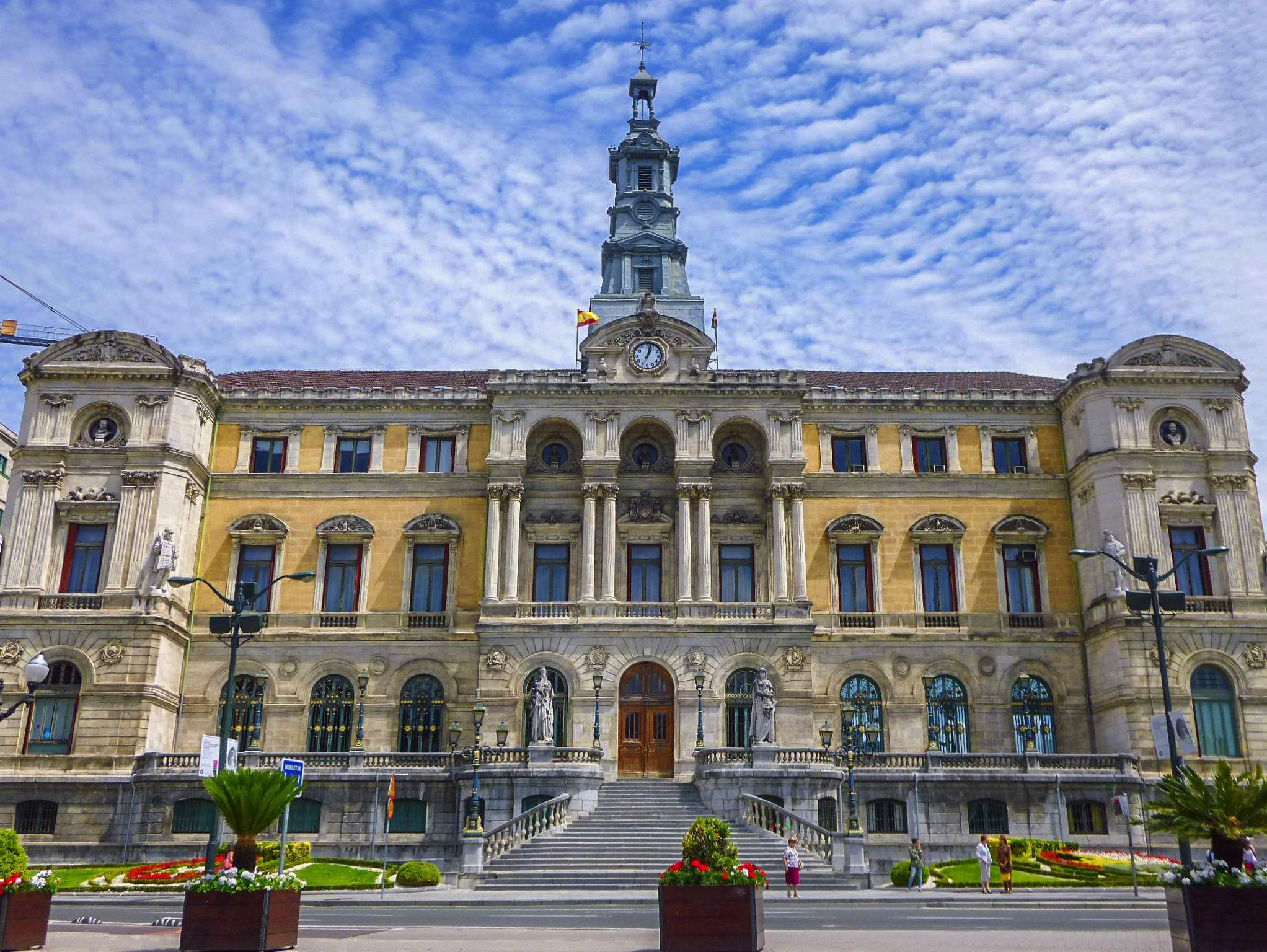
Bilbao City Hall

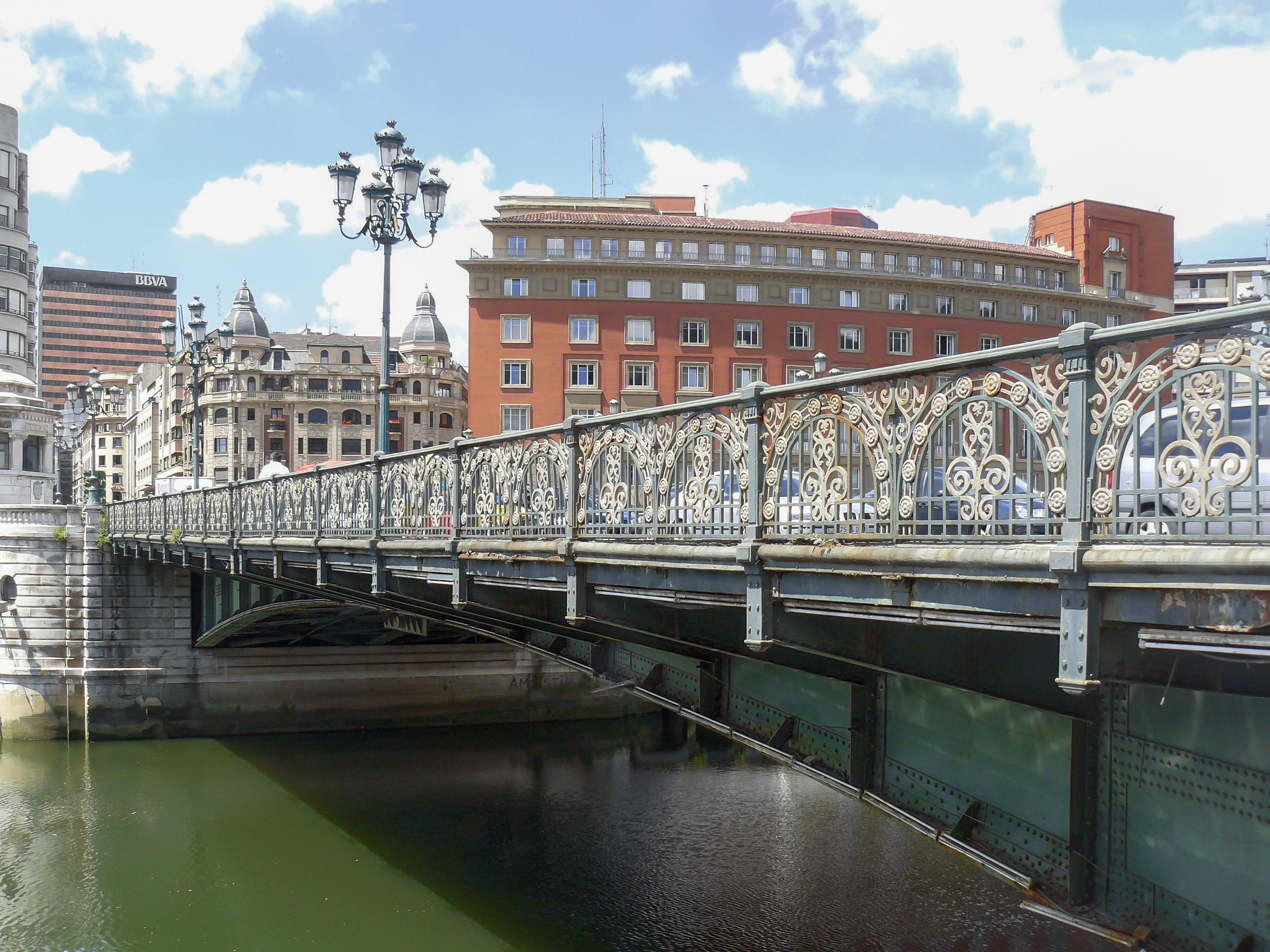
City Hall Bridge

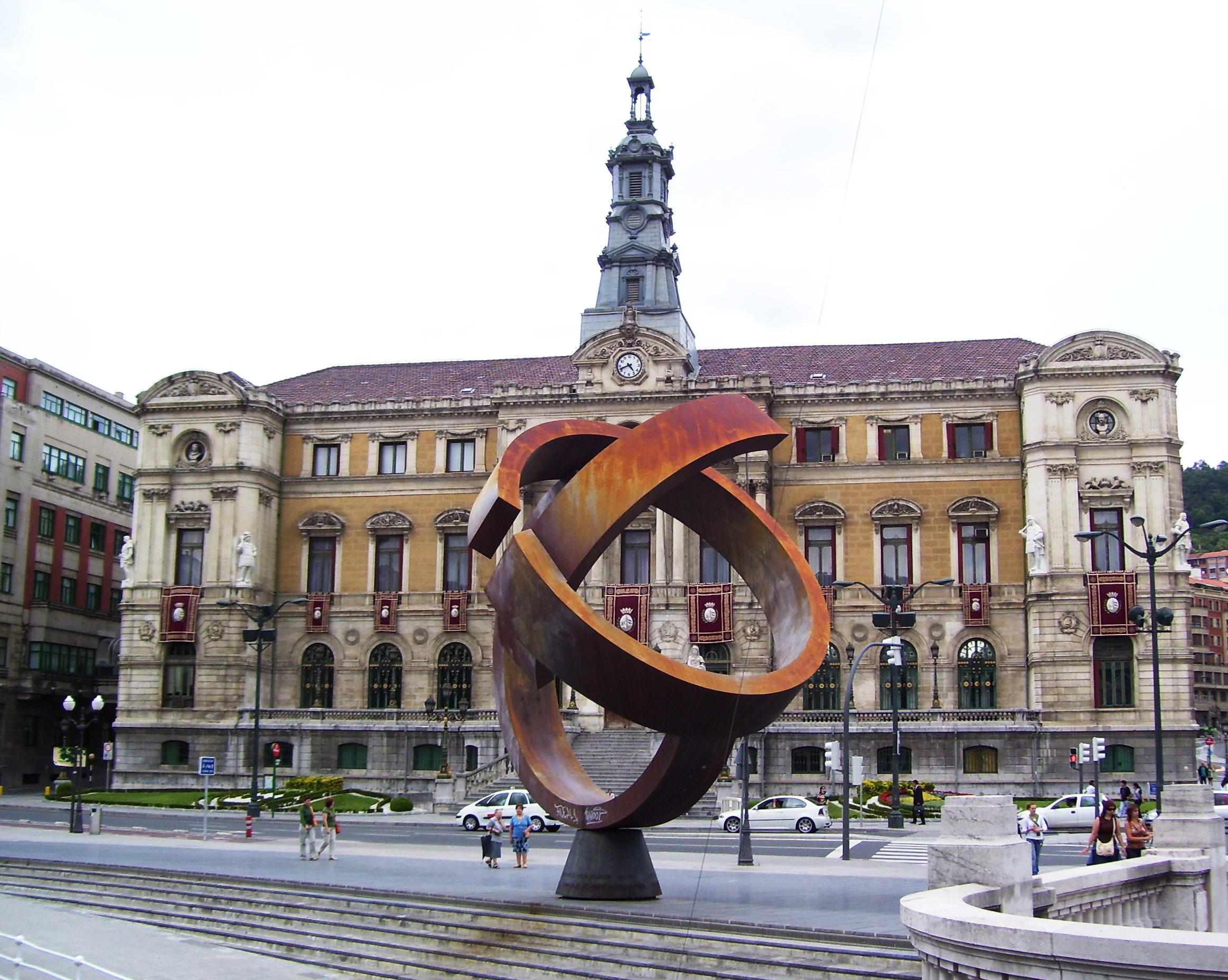
Esferaren desokupazioaren oboide aldaera

== Transportation ==
- Bilbao-Abando railway station, Bilbao Metro, Buenos Aires Street
- Pío Baroja station, Bilbao tram, City Hall Bridge
- Bilbobus and Bizkaibus station outside of the Bilbao City Hall
