= Areso (surname) =

Areso is a Spanish surname. Notable people with the surname include:

- Ibon Areso (born 1944), Spanish politician and architect
- Jesús Areso (born 1999), Spanish professional footballer
- Pedro Areso (1911–2002), Spanish footballer
