= Mayor of Bilbao =

- Coat of arms of Bilbao

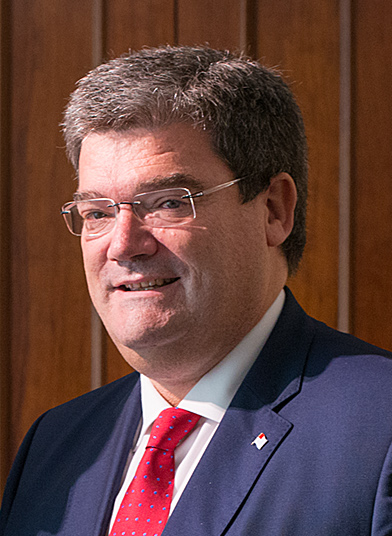
- Incumbent; Juan Mari Aburto since 13 June 2015
- City Council of Bilbao
- Term length: Four years, no limit.
- Formation: 14th century

The Mayor of Bilbao (Basque: Bilboko alkatea, Spanish: Alcalde de Bilbao) is the head of the municipal government of Bilbao, Spain. He presides over the Bilbao City Council.

The current mayor of Bilbao is Juan Mari Aburto since 2015.

== Mayors of Bilbao since 1979 ==
This is a list of the mayors of Bilbao since the restoration of democracy in Spain.

Since the Spanish transition to democracy, seven individuals have served as mayors of Bilbao. The longest term was that of Iñaki Azkuna, who served for almost 15 years as mayor until his death. All modern mayors of Bilbao have been members of the Basque Nationalist Party.

#	Mayor	Term start	Term end	Party
1	Jon Castañares	April 19, 1979	May 22, 1983	Basque Nationalist Party
2	José Luis Robles	May 22, 1983	July 19, 1987	Basque Nationalist Party
3	José Maria Gorordo	July 20, 1987	December 17, 1990	Basque Nationalist Party
4	Jesús María Duñabeitia	December 17, 1990	June 14, 1991	Basque Nationalist Party
5	Josu Ortuondo Larrea	June 17, 1991	July 2, 1999	Basque Nationalist Party
6	Iñaki Azkuna	July 3, 1999	March 20, 2014	Basque Nationalist Party
7	Ibon Areso	March 21, 2014	June 13, 2015	Basque Nationalist Party
8	Juan Mari Aburto	June 13, 2015	Incumbent	Basque Nationalist Party
