= City Hall Bridge =

Bascule bridge in Bilbao, Spain

City Hall Bridge Udaletxeko zubia
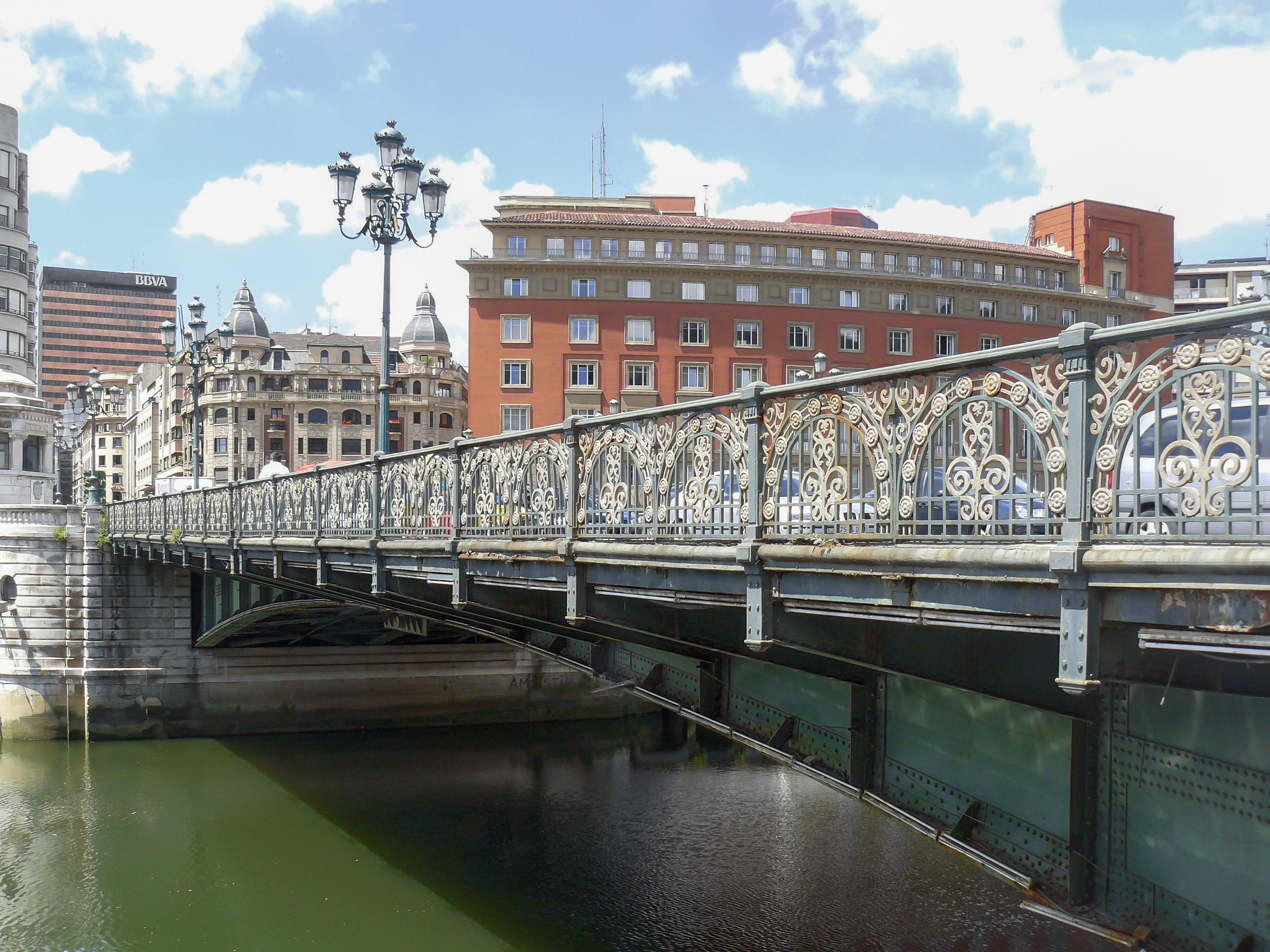
- Coordinates: 43°15′36″N 2°55′12″W
- Locale: Bilbao, Spain

History
- Opened: 12 December 1934

Location
- Interactive map of City Hall Bridge

The City Hall Bridge (Basque: Udaletxeko zubia; Spanish: Puente del Ayuntamiento), formerly known as the Begoña Bridge (Basque: Begoñako zubia), is a bascule bridge on the estuary of Bilbao, connecting the districts of Gazteleku on the right and Abando on the left.

== History ==
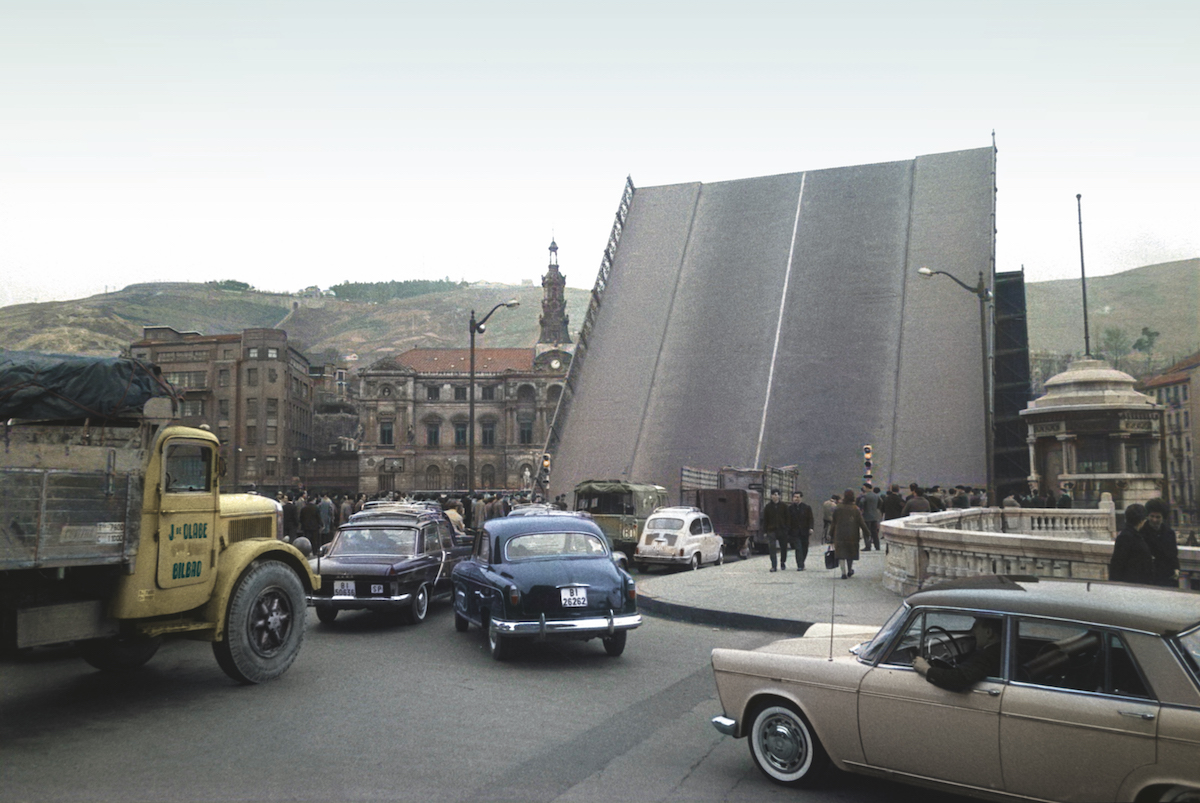
Bilbao City Hall Bridge

At the end of the 1920s, Bilbao expanded from the estuary and the Begoña Bridge was built to connect the city center with the Bilbao City Hall and the recently incorporated Begoña district.

The city decided to build a drawbridge so that commercial ships from the port could pass. In 1926, the mayor of Bilbao, Federico Moyúa, sent architect Ricardo Bastida (1879–1953) to Chicago to study drawbridges. Cantilever bridges were popular at the time. In Chicago, Bastida took inspiration from the Michigan Avenue Bridge, which was built in 1920. Back home, Bastida tasked the engineers Ignacio Rotaetxe and José Ortiz de Artiñano with the construction of the bridge.

The bridge that connected Sendeja Street and Buenos Aires Street was initially called the Begoña Bridge. Designed in 1929, its construction began in October 1933 and was carried out by the Euskalduna and Babcock & Wilcox factories.

The bridge opened on 12 December 1934, but was destroyed on 17 June 1937 during the Spanish Civil War. The Francoists built a temporary bridge using barges and soon they started the work to rebuild the bridge. It was reopened in 1941 as "General Mola's Bridge". In 1983, the bridge regained its original name.

In 2021, the bridge was subject to a technical inspection by the Bilbao City Council, verifying the structural integrity of the bridge.
