= Pilar Careaga =

First female engineer from Spain and also a politician

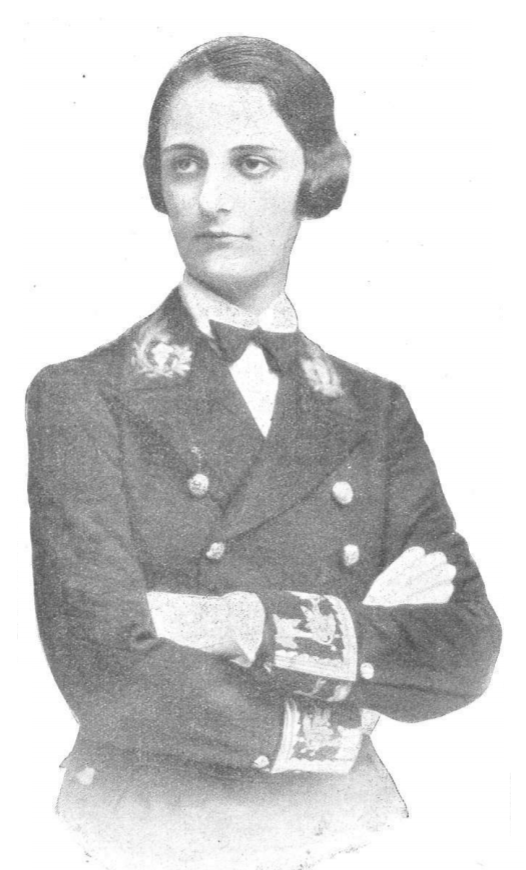

Mayor of Bilbao
- In office 1969–1977

Personal details
- Born: 26 October 1908 Madrid, Spain
- Died: 10 June 1993 (aged 84) Madrid, Spain

Maria del Pilar Careaga Basabe (26 October 1908 – 10 June 1993) was a Spanish politician and industrial engineer. She was the first woman to be mayor of Bilbao.

== Early life and education ==
Careaga was born in Madrid, the daughter of Pedro González de Careaga y Quintana, count of Cadagua, and Concepción Basabe y Zubiría. She studied surveying, and then completed her studies in industrial engineering at the Technical University of Madrid, becoming the first woman engineer in Spain. She also became the first woman in Spain to drive a train.

== Politics ==
Pilar Careaga was an unsuccessful Renovación Española candidate for Biscay province in the Spanish election of 1933. At the beginning of the Spanish Civil War, she was put in Larrínaga Prison. She was freed in a prisoner exchange in September 1936.

She then travelled to the front in Madrid where she represented the Falange Española Tradicionalista y de las Juntas de Ofensiva Nacional Sindicalista, looking after injured Franco supporters. She returned to Bilbao after the war.

In 1964, she was appointed to the provincial council for the Movimiento Nacional, serving as the first woman deputy for Biscay from 1964 to 1969. She served as mayor of Bilbao from 1969 to 1977.

On 25 March 1979 Careaga was shot six times by ETA whilst seated with her husband in her car driving to church in Guecho. This was the first time the organisation attempted to assassinate a woman. She survived but retired from public life.

== Personal life ==
In 1943, Careaga married Enrique Lequerica Erquiza, an engineer who was the brother of José Félix de Lequerica y Erquiza. She died in Madrid at the age of 84.
