= Federico Moyúa =

Spanish politician

Federico Moyúa Salazar
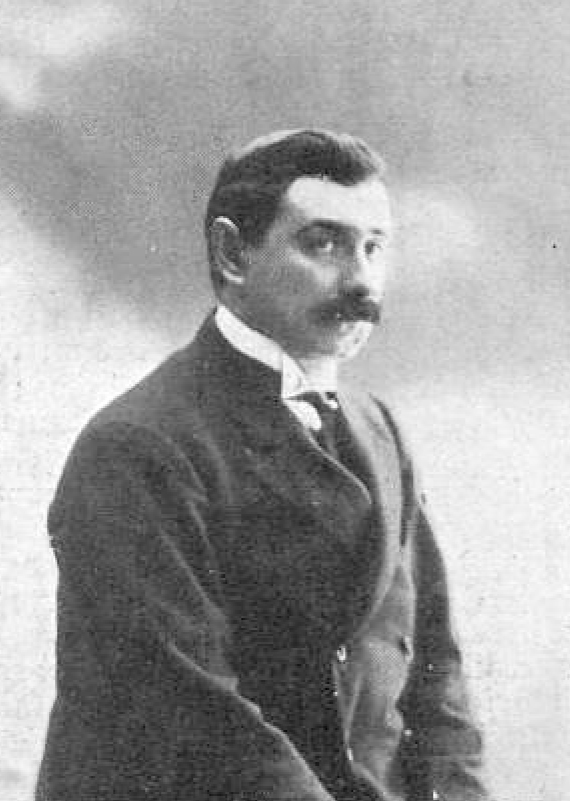

Mayor of Bilbao
- In office 1 January 1909 – 28 October 1913
- Preceded by: Eugenio Martínez Sevilla
- Succeeded by: Benito Marco Gardoqui
- In office 27 February 1924 – 25 February 1930
- Preceded by: Justo Somonte Iturrioz
- Succeeded by: Adolfo González de Careaga

Personal details
- Born: 19 November 1873 Bilbao, Spain
- Died: 7 March 1939 (aged 67) Bilbao, Spain
- Party: Liberal Fusionist Party; Liga de Acción Monárquica
- Education: University of Deusto
- Occupation: Politician, lawyer
- Awards: Order of Isabella the Catholic

Federico de Moyúa y Salazar (17 June 1873 - 7 March 1939) was a Spanish politician who served as the mayor of Bilbao.

== Biography ==
Moyúa was a member of a wealthy liberal family, both his father and grandfather served in the Third Carlist War. He studied law at the University of Deusto and practiced only for a few years.

A member of the Liberal Fusionist Party, he was elected mayor in 1910, and was succeeded by Benito Marco Gardoqui in 1913. He served again in 1924, during the Dictatorship of Primo de Rivera, until 1930.

During his term, he promoted infrastructure. Among the greatest achievements of his term includes the Ordunte Reservoir, the Deusto Bridge, the City Hall Bridge, and the Ribera Market.

Moyúa tried to expand Bilbao by incorporating the municipalities on the banks of the estuary, but was ultimately unachieved.

Plaza Elíptica, in Bilbao, was officially named after Moyúa for decades until 2026, when its original name was restored.

== Decoration ==
- Order of Isabella the Catholic (1925)
