= Lan Ekintza Bilbao =

Municipal agency for socio-economic development and equality

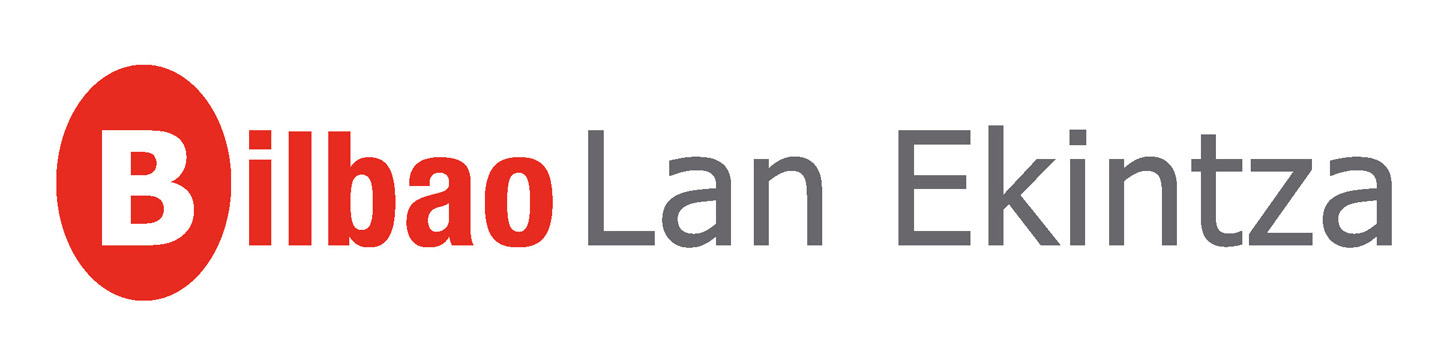
Lan Ekintza's logo.

Lan Ekintza Bilbao was a local development agency of the Bilbao City Council with a public service mission which started operations in 1989. Its remit was to improve the quality of life of the citizens and the city of Bilbao, ensuring that development did not disturb the socio-economic balance among the city's districts and their residents.

Lan Ekintza's responsibilities included employment offices, promoting city trade, and boosting entrepreneurship and innovation.

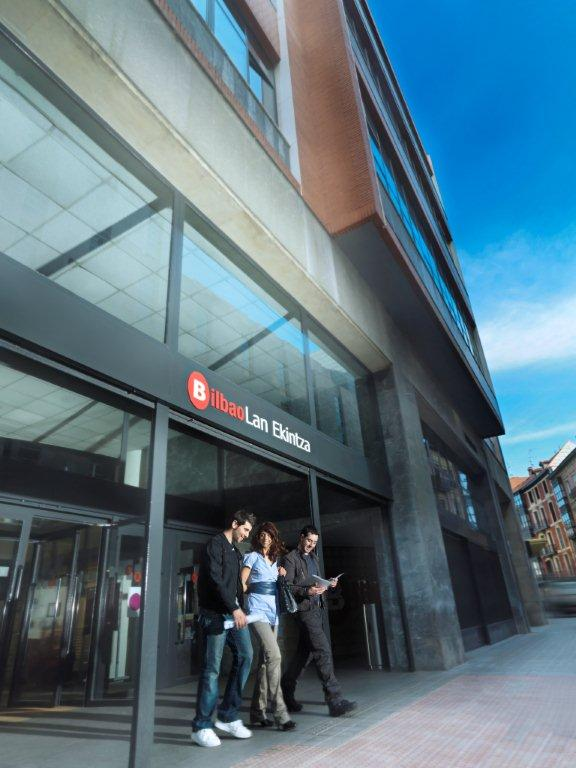
Head office of Lan Ekintza Bilbao.

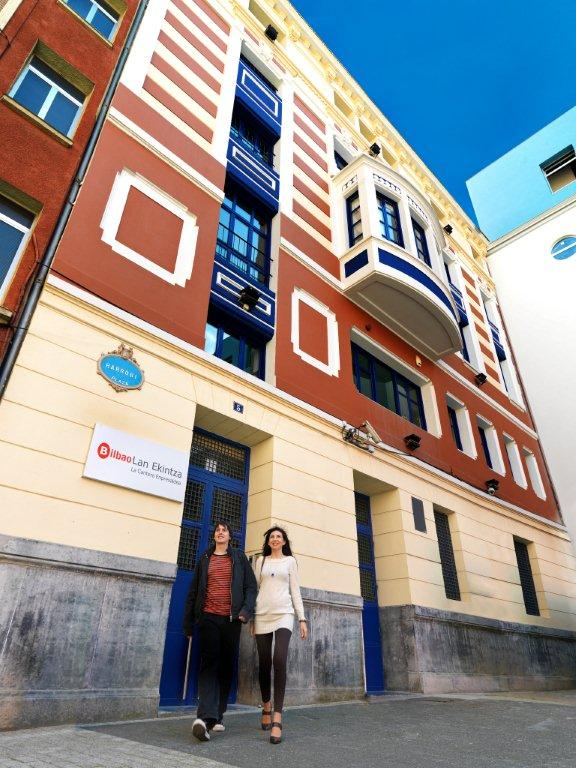
Offices in the business center of Lan Ekintza in Bilbao La Vieja (Old Bilbao).

It targeted job seekers, marginalized social collectives, individuals needing various kinds of training, young/small/medium entrepreneurs, companies seeking commercial advice, local shops, amongst other groups, in its actions.
