= Iñaki Azkuna =

Spanish politician (1943–2014)

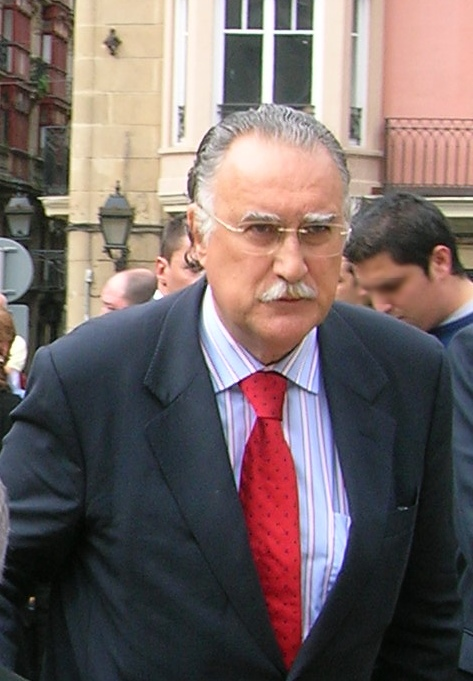
- Iñaki Azkuna in 2005

Mayor of Bilbao
- In office July 4, 1999 – March 20, 2014
- Preceded by: Josu Ortuondo
- Succeeded by: Ibon Areso

Personal details
- Born: Iñaki Azkuna Urreta; February 14, 1943 Durango, Spain
- Died: March 20, 2014 (aged 71) Bilbao, Spain
- Party: Basque Nationalist Party

Iñaki Azkuna Urreta (14 February 1943 – 20 March 2014) was a Spanish politician of the Basque Nationalist Party. He was mayor of the city of Bilbao, Biscay in the Basque Country, from 1999 until his death. In 2012, Azkuna won the World Mayor Prize, honoring the most outstanding mayors in the world, for his transformation of industrial Bilbao into a cultural centre.

Azkuna died from prostate cancer on 20 March 2014 in Bilbao, Biscay. He was 71 years old.
