= Basque Dub Foundation =

Basque Dub Foundation, more often known as B D F, started in the early 1990s as studio project by Iñaki Yarritu (a.k.a. Inyaki), a London-based reggae musician originally from the Basque Country (northern Spain). Iñaki moved into music production in the late 1980s, having been previously involved in Reggae since the late 1970s as a radio DJ, journalist and promoter. In their early days BDF toured as a sound system, supporting Mad Professor in the first dub sessions to take place in Spain.

In 1997, BDF released their debut album Sustraidun Roots Dub (Massive Sounds – 1997) ("Sustraidun" is Basque for "Rootical") the first dub album ever to come out of Spain. A landmark that started to give BDF an international reputation. This first effort was a collection of instrumental and dub workouts featuring a mix of original material, and some Roots Reggae classics covers, such as Abyssinians' "Satta Amassagana", Junior Byles' "Fade Away" and Augustus Pablo's "Cassava Piece". Sustraidun Roots Dub revived the spirit of the original Jamaican 1970s dub, while incorporating the aesthetic of the 1990s UK digital dub and a strong dose of traditional Spanish and Basque melodies. The album features UK dub stalwarts such as Mad Professor, Dub Judah, and Dougie Wardrop.

After this release BDF, evolved into a live band specialising in Roots Reggae and Dub. BDF's live shows capture the unique feel of the golden era of the 1960s, 70s and 80s sound, the era before the digital technology took Reggae music into a different phase. BDF supported international tours by major artists such as The Wailers, Culture, Burning Spear and Lee Perry. Their live performances have been enthusiastically reviewed, drawing praise for being one of the few bands still playing original 1970s dub with live (real) instruments.

In 2002, BDF released their second album BDF meets Loud & Lone (Brixton Records). A musical collaboration with Loud & Lone (Roberto Sanchez & Borja Juanco) "inna Showcase Style" (vocal plus dub). BDF Meets Loud & Lone recreated with precision the atmospheric sounds of roots reggae's golden era. Using only live instruments and analogue recording, playing the music they love in the same style as the artists that have influenced them. This second album increased BDF's international following.

In the last 10 years BDF has been touring live in Europe and playing as a backing band for international Reggae artists such as Alton Ellis, The Heptones, Earl Sixteen, Anthony Johnson, U Brown, Kenny Knots, Aisha, Dub Judah, Tena Stelin, Jah Marnyah and Afrikan Simba. BDF is also in demand as a studio band having recorded their own productions while also acting as a studio session band and producing foundation Jamaican artists such as Alton Ellis, David Hinds (Steel Pulse), Luciano, Mikal Rose, Sugar Minnot, Gregory Isaacs, Al Campbell, Admiral Tibbet, Little Roy, Ranking Joe, Johnny Osborne, Ernest Wilson, Wayne Smith, Hopeton James, Zareb, Dawn Penn, Chronicle, U Brown, Queen Omega, Lone Ranger, General Levy, Carlton Livingstone, Eddie Fitzroy, Pinchers and a new generation of French and Spanish artists: Original Uman, Roberto Sanchez, Rootsamala, Little Dani and Tiwony.

BDF has recut classic riddims like "Fade Away”, “Real Rock”, “Promised land”, “Slaving”, “I Know Myself” and “Tonite”. Also some originals like “Ministerio Del Dub”. All released by French label (and Sound System) Heartical as 7" vinyl singles. So far, more than 60 different titles.

In 2010, BDF released a third album (12" vinyl – EP): "Roots Melodies". A return to BDF's original Instrumental and Dub origins. An eight track EP in a showcase style (four instrumentals and four dub versions) consisting of keyboard instrumentals in the classic 1970s tradition of Jackie Mittoo, Augustus Pablo, Ansel Collins, Pablove Black, Winston Wright, the Butler Brothers and many more reggae instrumentalists.

Old-school, analogue productions using real instruments: Hammond organ, Rhodes, piano, guitars, bass, drums, percussion, featuring the keyboard and melodica skills and also the compositions and arrangements of Inyaki Yarritu, who also plays bass, drums, percussion. Also, two more vinyl releases on 12": "Lightning & Thunder" (an original Augustus Pablo composition) on the ONE IN THE SPIRIT label and Faith (Dreadful Time), Famine and Rasta Calling. Voiced by Nattykaf and Nereus Joseph, on the Kaf Island label. The latest release is "Forward To Jah" by Rootsamala.
