= Alberto Duñabeitia =

Spanish footballer

Personal information
- Full name: Alberto Duñabeitia de la Mota
- Date of birth: 7 January 1900
- Place of birth: Bilbao, Biscay, Spain
- Date of death: 1 January 1980 (aged 79)
- Place of death: Bilbao, Biscay, Spain
- Position: Defender

Senior career*
Years	Team	Apps	(Gls)
1920–1922	RCD Espanyol		
1922–1926	Athletic Club		
- * Club domestic league appearances and goals

Alberto Duñabeitia de la Mota (7 January 1900 – 1 January 1980) was a Spanish footballer who played as a defender for RCD Espanyol and Athletic Bilbao. He was the father of the former president of Athletic Club and mayor of Bilbao, Jesús María Duñabeitia.

== Biography ==
Duñabeitia was born in Bilbao into a family of athletes, and as a young man, he played football on the beach of Pedernales. Later he practiced athletics, and in 1918, he became the Biscayan high jump champion thanks to a jump of 1,525 meters and then established the Biscayan countryside record in the high jump. In 1920, he moved to Barcelona to study chemistry at the University of Barcelona, and whilst out in the Catalan capital, he took the opportunity to play football with the Espanyol first team for two seasons between 1920 and 1922.

In 1923, Duñabeitia returned to Bilbao to play for Athletic, then coached by Fred Pentland, and in his first season at the club, he won the 1923 Copa del Rey, starting in the final, precisely in Barcelona, where he kept a clean sheet to help his side to a 1–0 win over CE Europa; while in Barcelona some newspaper was already printing its front page with the victory of the Catalan team. In total, he played 9 official games over four seasons between 1923 and 1926.

Duñabeitia later became a chemical engineer at the company Sociedad Española de la Dinamita. He brought athletics to Galdakao, Biscay. He died on 1 January 1980, at the age of 79.

== Honours ==
Athletic Club

- Copa del Rey:
  - Winners: 1923
- Biscay Championship:
  - Winners: 1923 and 1924
