= Juan Mari Aburto =

Spanish politician

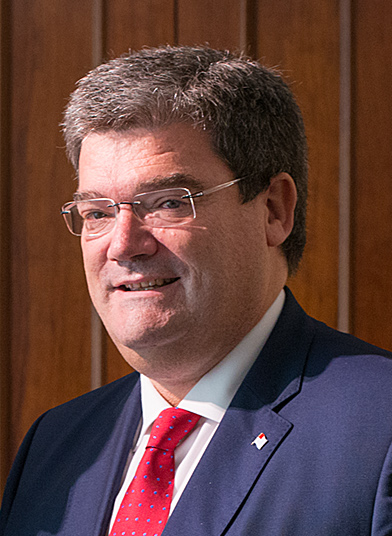

Mayor of Bilbao
- Incumbent
- Assumed office 13 June 2015
- Preceded by: Ibon Areso

Personal details
- Born: Juan María Aburto Rike; 28 March 1961 (age 65) Bilbao, Spain
- Party: Basque Nationalist Party
- Education: University of Deusto
- Occupation: Politician

Juan María Aburto Rike (born 28 March 1961) is a Spanish politician of the Basque Nationalist Party. He was elected mayor of Bilbao in 2015.

== Biography ==
Born in Bilbao, Aburto graduated in law from the University of Deusto in 1984, and became a civil servant for the Provincial Deputation of Biscay in 1986. In the early 1990s, he worked in the Basque Government under Interior Minister Juan María Atutxa.

Returning to provincial politics, he was a deputy to provincial leader José Luis Bilbao from 2011 to 2012. In December that year he went back to the regional government, to be Minister of Employment and Social Policy.

In October 2014, he was chosen as the PNV candidate for Bilbao's mayoral election in 2015. He resigned from his ministry in February. His party won 13 out of 29 seats and achieved a majority by forming a coalition with the Socialist Party (PSE-EE).

Aburto won re-election in June 2019, forming the same coalition with 14 and 5 seats respectively and delegating four specific areas to the PSE.

In April 2021, Aburto announced that he had cancer of the duodenum in the small intestine, having twice previously had the same diagnosis 13 and seven years earlier.
