= 1983 Spanish floods =

Fatal natural disaster in Spain

- Date: 26–27 August 1983
- Location: northern Spain
- Deaths: 34 deaths, 5 disappeared
- Property damage: 150 billion pesetas

The 1983 Spanish floods were a natural disaster that occurred between 26 and 27 August 1983 in northern Spain, particularly in the Biscay region, where the Aste Nagusia – the Bilbao city festival – had been taking place. The flood resulted in significant damage to property and caused the deaths of 34 people, with another five unaccounted for. The flood led to preventive measures being put in place and the redevelopment of Bilbao's riverside.

== Background ==
Prior to the 1983 flood, the Biscay region had experienced at least 42 floods since 1403, though none of the recent ones had resulted in fatalities.

== Flooding ==
Abnormally heavy rainfall in the Gipuzkoa region on 25 August caused the Deba, Oria and Urola rivers to burst their banks, causing flooding in the neighbouring towns. Further heavy rainfall early on the 26th at the confluence of the Nervión and Ibaizabal rivers led to extreme flooding in the city of Bilbao. Heavy rain continued until 9 am on the 27th. This caused significant destruction to Bilbao's Casco Viejo district, seriously damaging some historic buildings, with water 3 metres (9.8 ft) deep in some places. Over 5,000 residents had to be evacuated.

== Response and aftermath ==
The fire services, police and military arrived to help from all over the country. Following the tragedy, the Basque regional government devised a flood prevention plan, and spent the 2024 equivalent of hundreds of millions of euros on measures to prevent and mitigate the risks, including the installation of early-warning alerts and the provision of drainage systems. The regional government also began to redevelop Bilbao's riverside areas.

These were the costliest floods in Spain until the October 2024 floods.
