= Jesús María Duñabeitia =

Spanish politician (1929–2013)

Jesús María Duñabeitia Vidal (25 November 1929 – 26 November 2013) was a Spanish politician of the Basque Nationalist Party and football executive. He was the only person to be president of Athletic Bilbao (1977–1982) and mayor of Bilbao (1990–1991).

== Early life and Athletic Bilbao ==
Known as "Beti", he was born in the Casco Viejo of Bilbao as the son of Athletic Bilbao footballer Alberto Duñabeitia (1900–1980). His grandfather ran a gift shop. He himself played football and won a medal in an international university tournament. In 1977, he was elected president of Athletic Bilbao in the early days of the Spanish transition to democracy; under his mandate the club began to officially display the Basque flag. Other changes during his tenure included naming Javier Clemente as manager, putting the presidency up for universal suffrage of club members and allowing women to become club members.After turning down a plan by his predecessor to build a new stadium, instead renovating for the 1982 FIFA World Cup, Duñabeitia left Athletic Bilbao in 1982 and became a full-time politician.

== Politics and death ==
In 1983, he was elected to Bilbao City Council and became the councillor in charge of social welfare, under mayor José Luis Robles. Later, while in charge of the Water Board, he had to place restrictions on water use during the droughts of 1988 and 1989. After the resignation of José María Gorordo, he became mayor in December 1990, serving until the June 1991 election.

Duñabeitia died the day after his 84th birthday. His funeral at Bilbao Cathedral was attended by colleagues from local football and politics.
