= Ibon Areso =

Spanish politician and architect

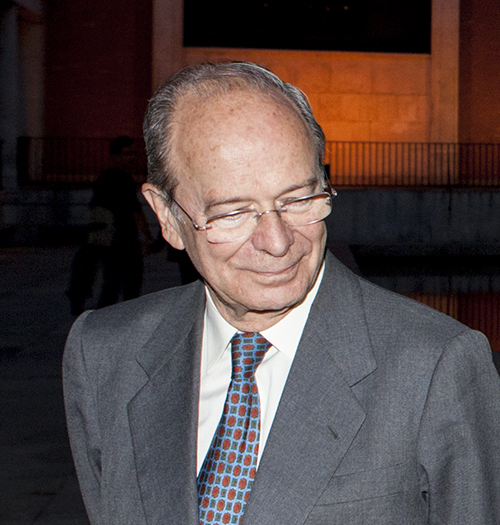

Mayor of Bilbao
- In office March 21, 2014 – June 13, 2015
- Preceded by: Iñaki Azkuna
- Succeeded by: Juan María Aburto

Personal details
- Born: Ibon Areso Mendiguren; May 20, 1944 (age 81) Lazkao, Spain

Ibon Areso Mendiguren (born May 20, 1944) is a Spanish politician and architect. He was the mayor of Bilbao between March 2014 and June 2015. He became mayor upon the death of Iñaki Azkuna. Before Azkuna's death, he was the Councillor of Urbanism in Bilbao.

In June 1991 he was elected councillor of the city of Bilbao for the Basque Nationalist Party and the then mayor Josu Ortuondo appointed him head of the Department of Urbanism and Environment while also performing as second mayor. He has been a member of the council up until June 2015. In March 2014 he was appointed mayor after the death of his predecessor, Iñaki Azkuna. While under Azkuna he performed as head of the Department of Urbanism and Coordinator of the Urban Development Plan.
