= Traveler curtain =

Type of theater curtain

Travelers opening and closing

A traveler curtain, also called draw curtain, bi-parting curtain, or just traveler, is the most common type of front curtain used in theaters. Traveler curtains remain at a fixed elevation and open and close horizontally, break up and meet in the middle, and consequently require a minimum of fly space. The curtains are typically made of velvet and decorated with a series of vertical box pleats along the top edge.

Traveler curtains may be rigged with or without an operating line. When rigged with an operating line, they may be motorized or operated manually. They are referred to as walk-draw or walk-along curtains when rigged without an operating line. When opened and closed manually with an operating line, they are called manual curtains. They are the least costly kind of theater curtain to construct and relatively simple to operate.

== Construction ==
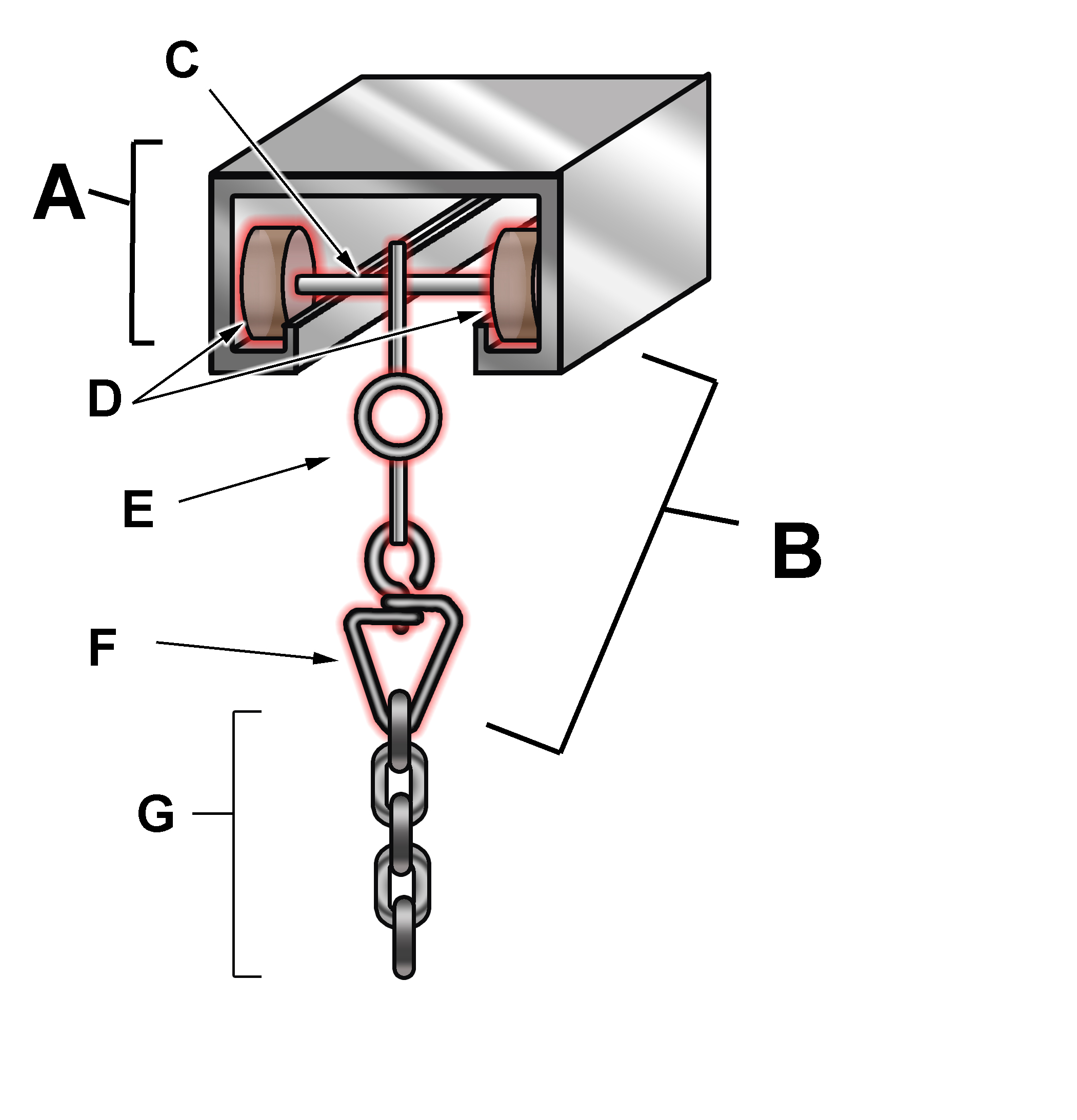
A diagram of the machinery that holds up a traveler front curtain. A.) Grooved metal channel; B.) Carrier; C.) Axle; D.) Wheels; E.) Eyelet; F.) Eye of Carrier G.) Trim chain.

Traveler curtains opening and closing with backpack guides

The opening and closing of a guillotine curtain

Traveler curtains are suspended on a series of short chains called trim chains. Each trim chain hangs from a wheeled assembly called a roller or carrier that is supported by and rolls along the inside of a horizontal metal channel or track. A heavy duty master carrier supports the moving edge of the curtain. The master carrier has four wheels, while all other carriers have only two wheels. A device called an end stop prevents the master carrier from being pulled out of its channel.

Directly below each carrier and above the chain is an eyelet through which the curtain operating line passes, if present. The operating line runs through two pulleys that are located near the tops of the curtains, one on each side of the stage (the dead end and live end pulleys), and then down to the stage floor, where it runs through a tension pulley before returning to the other pulleys in the fly space.

== Operation ==
Travelers are operated by pulling down on the rope segments that ascend from the tension pulley. One rope segment is pulled to open the curtains and the other is pulled to close the curtains.

Pulling down on the opener rope segment causes the master carriers, and the moving edges of the curtains they support, to travel toward the edges of the stage. As each master carrier travels through the channel, it collides with and collects the other carriers one-by-one. This growing group of carriers is pushed toward the edges of the stage, causing the fabric to bunch near the curtain's moving edge.

Pulling on the other rope segment causes each master carrier to travel toward center stage along with the curtain's moving edge. As the curtain becomes unbunched, fabric tension is created that pulls the other carriers through the channel.

== Variations ==
Traveler curtains may optionally be rigged with devices called backpack guides, which force the carriers to bundle the curtain off-stage rather than onstage. This causes the visible part of the curtain to remain unbunched so that it appears to be flat while it is being opened or closed.

Traveler style curtains can also be raised and lowered by a fly system, in which case they are referred to as fly curtains or, less frequently, guillotine curtains because they rise and fall much like a guillotine. When operated in this manner, they require at least as much fly space above them as the height of the curtain itself, but they allow a production to reveal or conceal the stage extremely quickly.

== See also ==
- Theater drapes and stage curtains
