= Oskorri =

Basque folk band

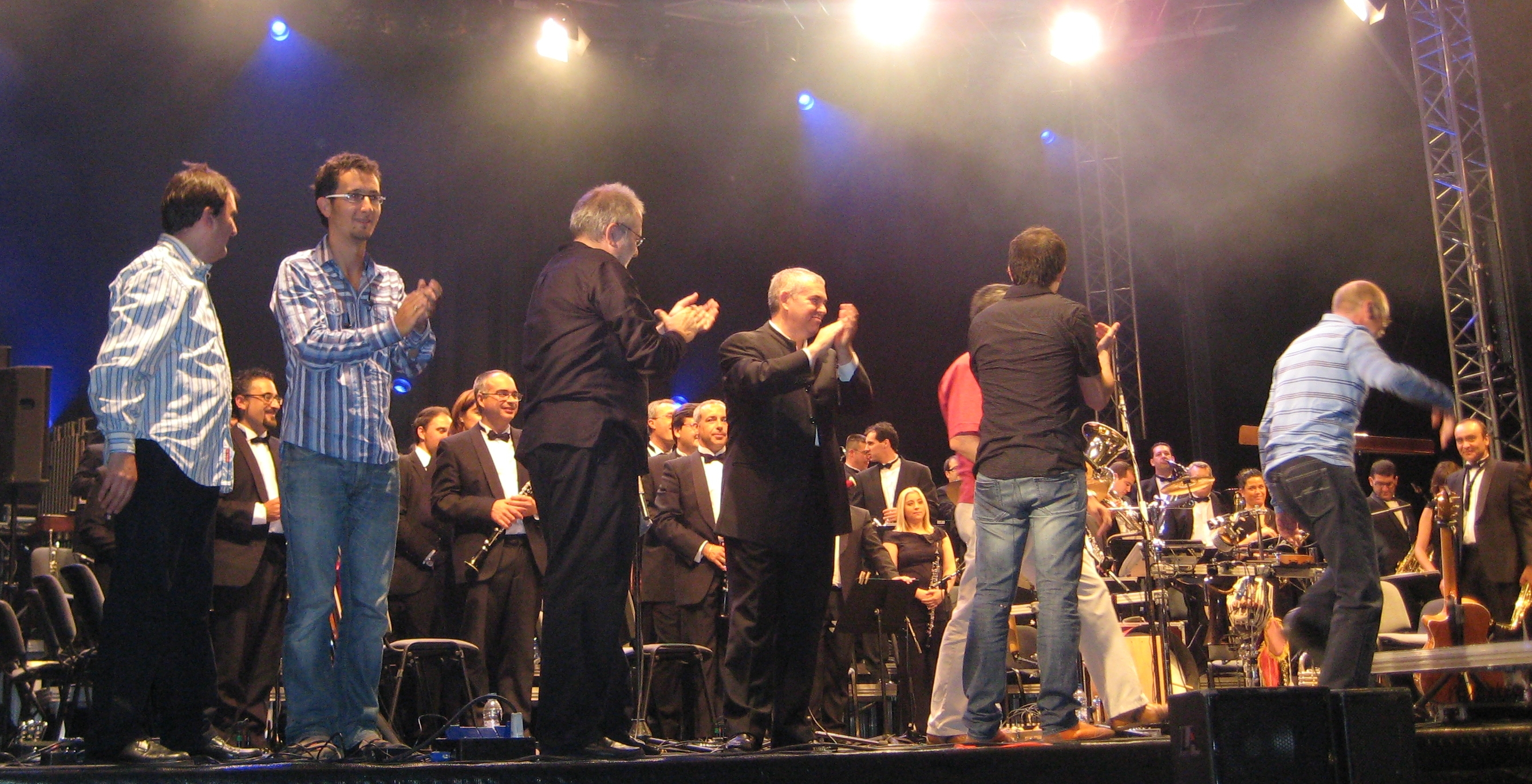
- Oskorri in Bilbao in 2008

Background information
- Origin: Basque Autonomous Community, Spain
- Genres: Folk
- Years active: 1971-2015
- Labels: Elkar
- Members: Natxo de Felipe; Antón Latxa; Bixente Martínez; Xavier Zeberio; Gorka Escauriaza; Íñigo Egia; Josu Zalbide

Oskorri is a folk band formed in the Western Basque Country in 1971. It is one of the most renowned folk groups in the Basque Country, with songs such as Euskal Herrian Euskaraz becoming popular in the region. Their first album was based on Gabriel Aresti poems. The group's name in Basque means "red sunset". Year after year, highlighted by his work capacity and capacity for experimentation. They began fusing jazz with traditional Basque instruments until they have come to find a style that defined within the European folk scene. It is one of the most veteran folk bands of Euskal Herria.

Oskorri was born at the time of the Spanish Transition, in the Basque musical scene dominated by the group Ez Dok Amairu. Therefore, the language in which they sang as the lyrics of their early songs (mostly poems by Gabriel Aresti), begins with a major protest content that is tempered with age. They gave their first concert in the auditorium of the University of Deusto in March 1971, with training in highlighting and Natxo Felipe, alma mater sole founder of the group and continues in it.

== Members ==
- Natxo de Felipe
- Antón Latxa
- Bixente Martínez
- Xabier Zeberio
- Gorka Escauriaza
- Íñigo Egia
- Josu Zalbide

== Discography ==
- Gabriel Arestiren Oroimenez (1975)
- Mosen Bernat Etxepare (1977)
- Oskorri (1979)
- Plazarik plaza (1980)
- ...eta Oskorri sortu zen (1981)
- Adio Kattalina (1982)
- Alemanian euskaraz (1984)
- Hau hermosurie (1984)
- In fraganti (1986)
- Hamabost urte... eta gero hau (1987)
- Datorrena datorrela (1989)
- Hi ere dantzari (1991)
- Badok hamairu (1992)
- Landalan (1992)
- 25 kantu-urte (1996)
- Marijane Kanta Zan! (1997)
- Oskorri – & The Pub Ibiltaria 1 (1997)
- Oskorri – & The Pub Ibiltaria 2 (1998)
- Oskorri – & The Pub Ibiltaria 3 (1999)
- Oskorri – & The Pub Ibiltaria 4 (2000)
- Ura (2000)
- Vizcayatik... Bizkaiara (2001)
- Desertore (2003)
- Oskorri – & The Pub Ibiltaria 9 (2004)
- Banda Band (2007)
- Dantza kontra dantza (2011, CD/DVD)
