= José Luis Robles =

Spanish politician

José Luis Robles Canibe (20 May 1927 – 27 January 2007) was a Spanish politician of the Basque Nationalist Party (PNV).

Robles was born in the working-class Zabala neighbourhood of Bilbao, where his father was a railwayman. He worked as a captain in the Merchant Navy.

In 1980, Robles was voted to the Basque Parliament, where he served until 1983. He was a minister for industry, energy and fishing; and later transport, communication and maritime issues. In 1983, he led the PNV list for local elections in Bilbao, replacing mayor Jon Castañares whose popularity was waning. He won by 15,000 votes over the Socialist Party of the Basque Country–Basque Country Left (PSE-EE) nominee and became mayor. Three months into his tenure, the city was hit by floods. He led the recovery, later reflecting that "from the waters surged the new Bilbao".

Robles was also a Senator from 1983 to 1989, representing the constituency of Biscay. In 2004, he was awarded with a gala by the Spanish Federation of Municipalities and Provinces. He died of cancer at the age of 79. Bilbao declared three days of official mourning and posthumously awarded him the city's Gold Medal. His funeral took place at the Basilica of Begoña.

His niece Isabel Sánchez Robles was also a city councillor in Bilbao and a member of the Congress of Deputies, representing the same party.
