= Bilbao City Hall =

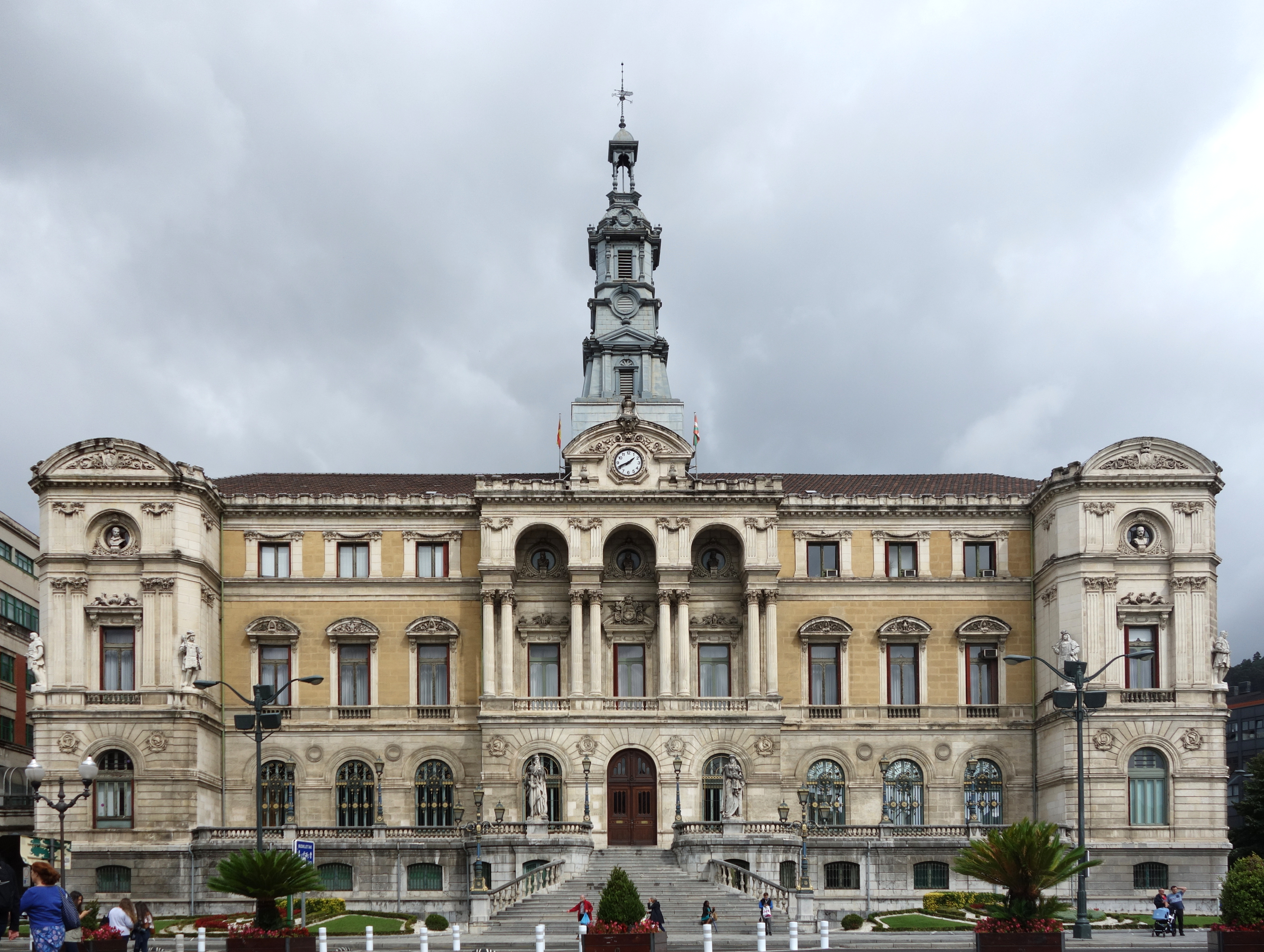
- Front façade of the city hall
- Interactive map of the Bilbao City Hall area

General information
- Location: Ernesto Erkoreka Plaza, 1, 48007 Bilbao, Biscay, Spain
- Coordinates: 43°15′50.450″N 2°55′22.721″W
- Construction started: 1883
- Completed: 1892
- Owner: Bilbao City Council

Design and construction
- Architect: Joaquín Rucoba

The Bilbao City Hall (Basque: Bilboko udaletxea) is the seat of the Bilbao City Council, the local ayuntamiento of Bilbao, Spain. The City Hall is located on the right bank of the Estuary of Bilbao across the Puente del Ayuntamiento bascule bridge that links it to the central Abando district.

The building was built in 1892 by Joaquín Rucoba, on the former site of a convent in the district of Uribarri. It was built in Baroque style. One of the highlights of the building is the Arab Hall, a richly decorated hall in the Neo-Mudéjar style that resembles the decorations found in the Alhambra of Granada. The hall is used for official receptions and weddings.

Before 1890, the Bilbao City Council was located in a building inside the Old Town.
