= Jon Castañares =

Spanish politician and economist

Jon Mirena Bitor Castañares Larreategui (1925 – 5 May 2015) was a Spanish politician and economist. He was known for being a strong supporter of Basque nationalism. He served as mayor of Bilbao from 1979 to 1983. He died in Bilbao at the age of 90.
