= Josu Ortuondo Larrea =

Spanish politician

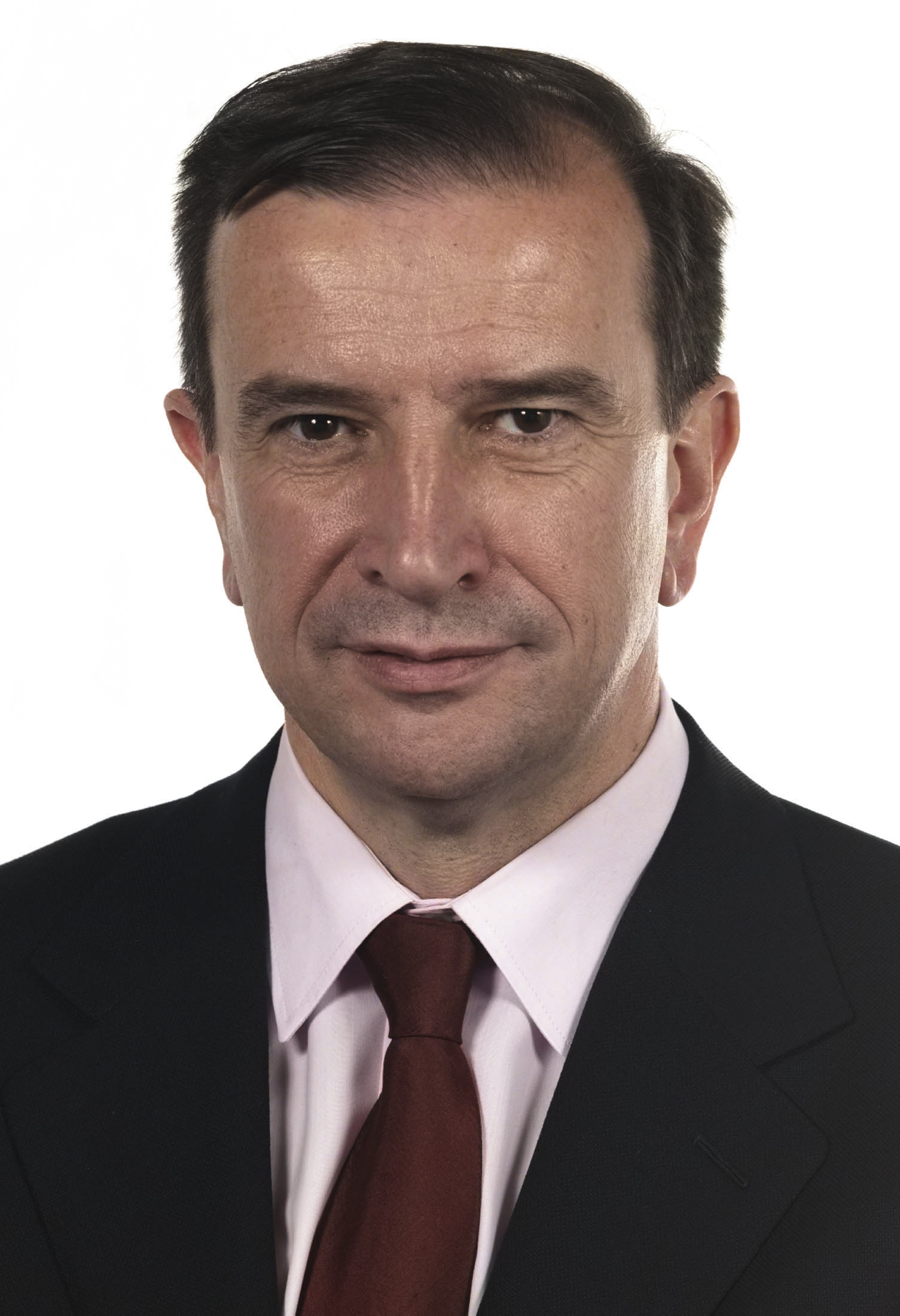
Ortuondo Larrea in 1999

Josu Ortuondo Larrea (born 13 February 1948 in Bilbao) is a Spanish politician and Member of the European Parliament with the Basque Nationalist Party, Member of the Bureau of the Alliance of Liberals and Democrats for Europe and sits on the European Parliament's Committee on Transport and Tourism.

He is a substitute for the Committee on Fisheries and the Committee on Industry, Research and Energy. He is also a member of the Delegation for relations with the countries of Central America.

== Education ==
- 1975: Graduate in business studies
- M.A
- 1982: in business administration

== Career ==
- 1969–1987: Banking executive
- 1993–1999: President of Bilbogás
- 2000 1993–1999: President of Bilbao Ria
- 1995–1999: Member of the executive committee and board of directors of Caja de Ahorros (bank)
- 1991–1999: President of the Bilbao International Fair
- 1979–1981: Member of the EAJ-PNV Regional Executive Committee
- 1983–1987: Member of the National Executive Committee, responsible for administration and finances
- 1991–1999: Mayor and Chairman of the Municipal Council of Bilbao
- 1995–1999: President of the Council of Basque Municipalities
- 1987–1991: Director-General of the Public Basque Radio and Television Corporation (EITB)
- 1994–1999: Member of the executive committee of the Council of European Municipalities and Regions
- 1995–1999: Member of the executive committee of 'Eurocities'
- 1998–1999: President of 'Eurocities'
- since 1999: Member of the European Parliament

== See also ==
- 2004 European Parliament election in Spain
