= Banco Bilbao Vizcaya (building) =

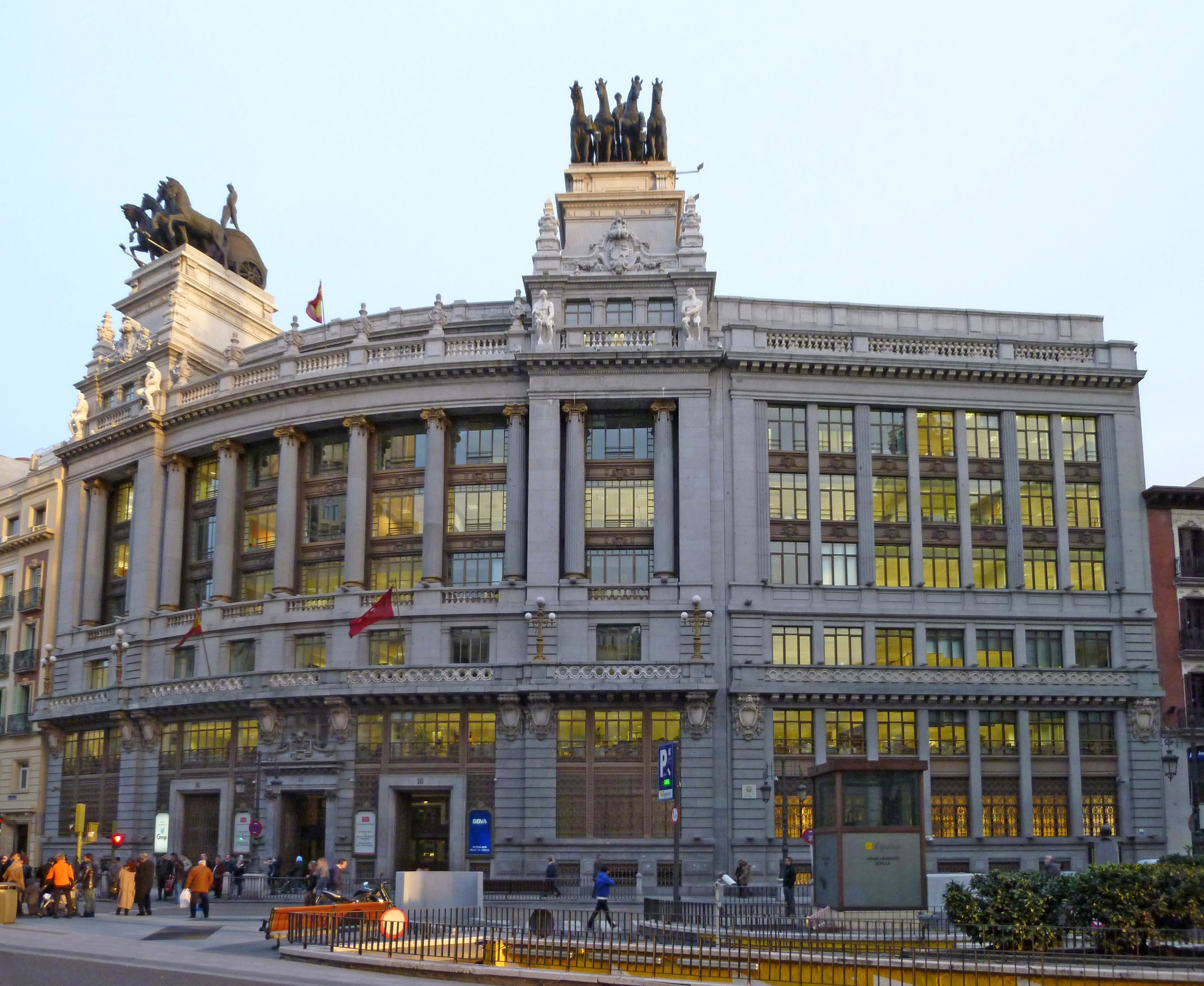

- Location within Spain
- 40.417560°N 3.699531°W
- Location: Madrid, Spain

History
- Built: 1920–1923

Site notes
- Architect: Ricardo Bastida

Spanish Cultural Heritage
- Official name: Banco Bilbao Vizcaya
- Type: Non-movable
- Criteria: Monument
- Designated: 1999
- Reference no.: RI-51-0010472

The Banco Bilbao Vizcaya (formerly Banco de Bilbao) is a building located at Calle de Alcalá, 16, in Madrid, Spain. Projected in 1919 by architect Ricardo Bastida (1879–1953) and built from 1920 to 1923 for Banco de Bilbao, a constituent financial institution of BBVA. It was declared Bien de Interés Cultural in 1999. The rotunda features murals painted by Aurelio Arteta in 1922 and restored in 2003.

== In popular culture ==
The final fight in the 2000 Spanish film La comunidad was shot among the quadrigas atop of the building.

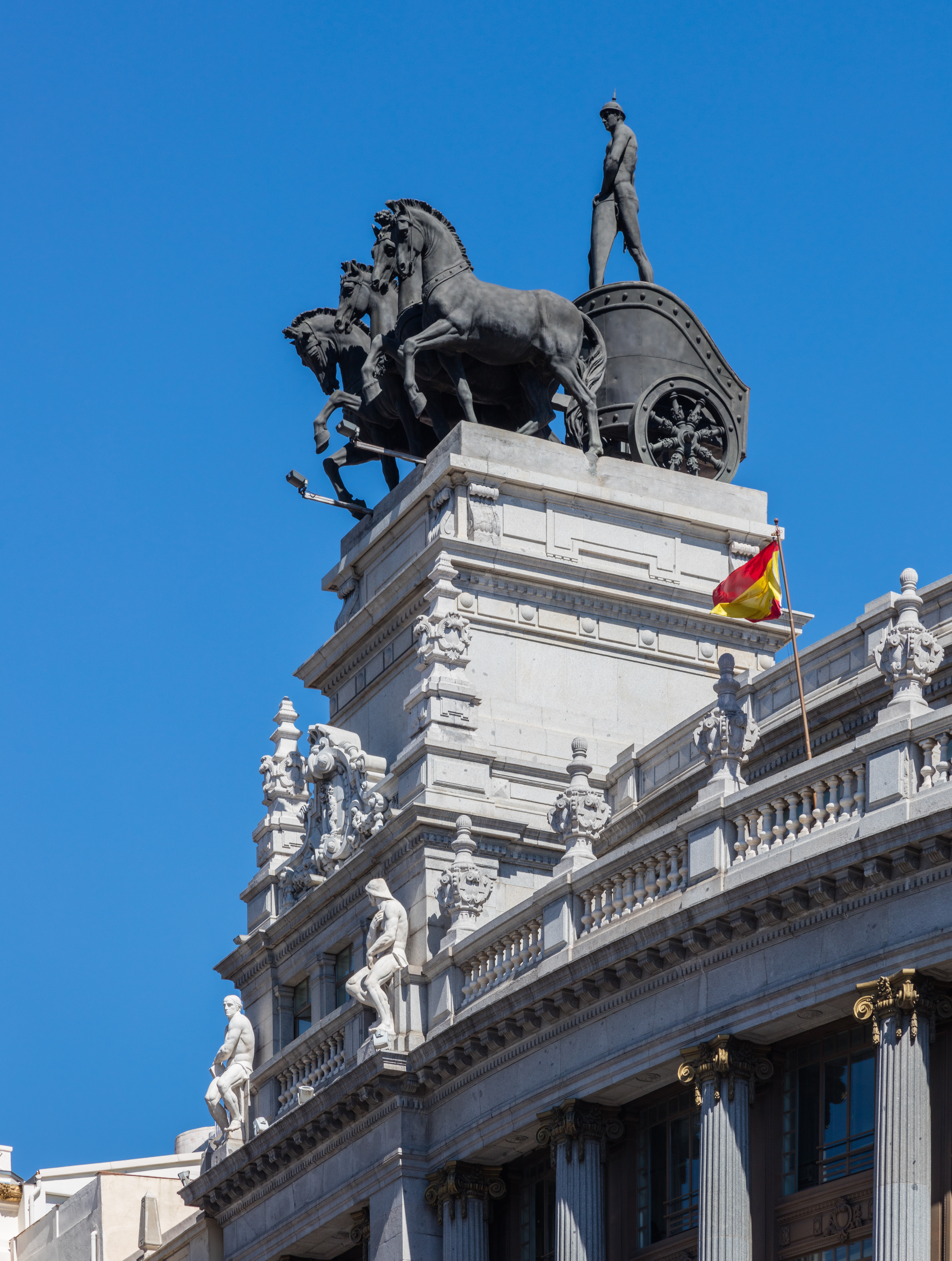
Detail of the quadriga
