= Deusto =

Coordinates: 43°16′20″N 2°56′45″W

- District
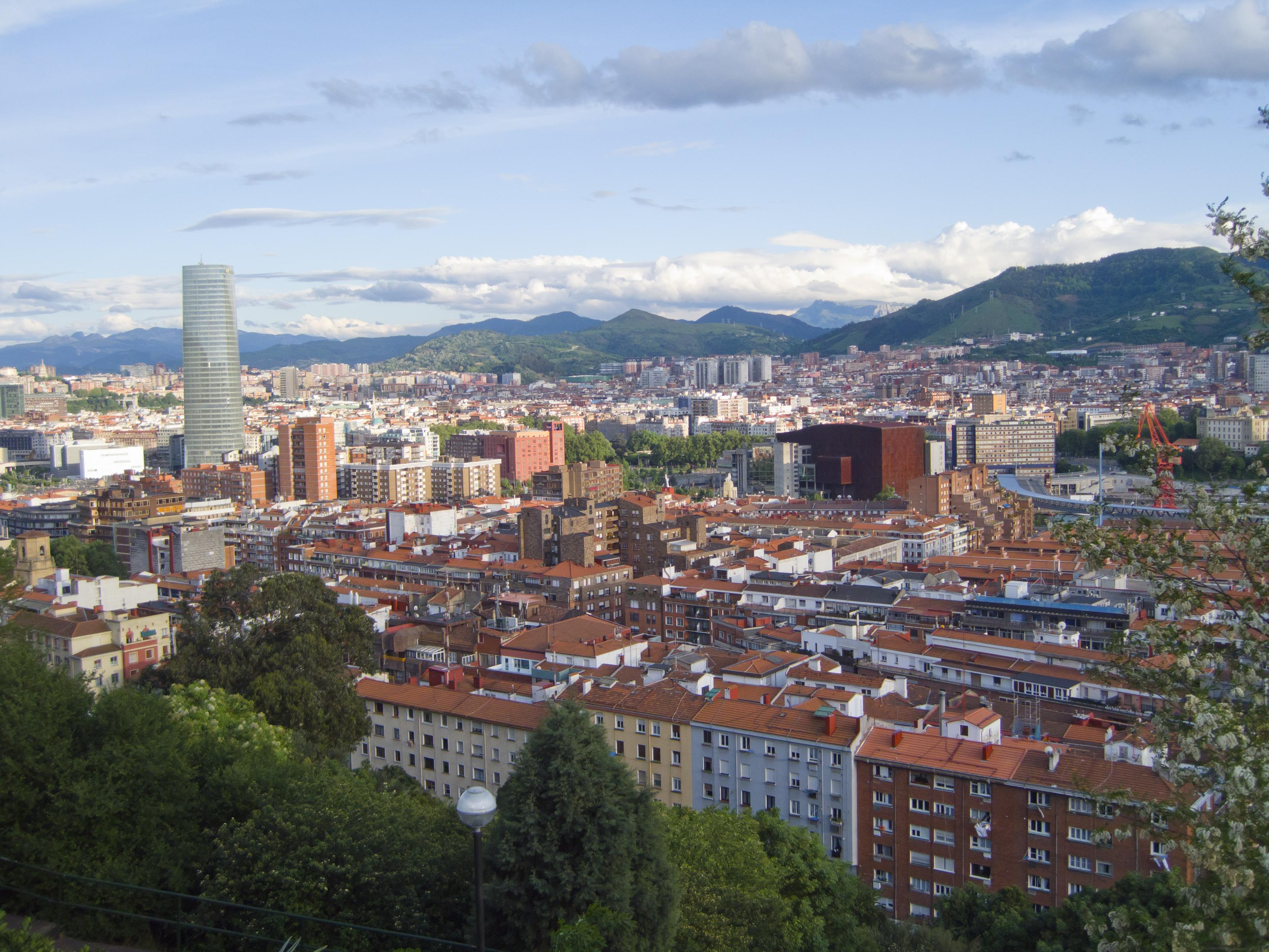
- Overview of Deusto from Arangoiti

- Location of Deusto within Bilbao
- Country: Spain
- Autonomous community: Basque Country
- Province: Biscay
- Comarca: Greater Bilbao
- Municipality: Bilbao

Area
  - Total: 4.95 km^{2} (1.91 sq mi)

Population (2017)
  - Total: 48,933
  - Density: 9,890/km^{2} (25,600/sq mi)

Deusto, also known as Deustu in Basque and formerly known as San Pedro de Deusto, is one of the eight districts of Bilbao, Spain. It is located on the right side of the Bilbao estuary, in the northwestern part of the city and bordering the estuary itself on the south and the southern hillside of Mount Artxanda and Mount Bandera on the north. Deusto was originally an elizate and also a municipality until 1925 when it was completely annexed by Bilbao in order to expand the free land available to the city. Deusto is known as the university district of the city as it is home to the University of Deusto and the Faculty of Economics and Business of the University of the Basque Country.

== History ==
Coat of arms of the former elizate of Deusto.

Little is known about the history of Deusto, as much of the local archives were destroyed during the Spanish Civil War. The exact moment of its foundation is unknown, but this is a common trait shared with other elizates across Biscay. It is known that the San Pedro de Deusto church was constructed some time around the 14th century and that until the 1700s the land was sparsely populated and the main economic activities were fishing and agricultural production, mostly wheat and vines.

The first town hall was erected in 1752, replaced by another building in 1888; this latter was demolished during the civil war. The town had the seat number 35 in the General Councils of Biscay. Traditionally, the municipality was divided into two quarters: Erribera (riverside) located by the river, which concentrated the commercial and maritime activities of the village, and Goierri (highland) at the foothills of mount Artxanda, which included most of the farm land. At the end of the 19th century the town enjoyed relative commercial prosperity thanks to the opening the railway line between Bilbao and Getxo, which included a station in Deusto. Using the railway line, many of the agricultural products from Deusto were more easily sold in the Ribera market of Bilbao.

A royal decree signed on 29 October 1924 established the annexation of Deusto to the city of Bilbao, effective on 1 January of the following year. Alongside Deusto, the elizates of Begoña and Lutxana were also annexed, although the latter would regain its autonomy in the early 1980s. In the following years a series of urban plans were developed, designed by architect Ricardo Bastida, with the aim of establishing a first urban grid for the district, which at the time still consisted mostly of scattered farmhouses. The rapid industrial development of Bilbao caused a massive migration of workers coming from elsewhere in Spain, and in consequence the creation of decadent shanty towns on the hills of the mount Banderas. These were demolished and replaced by apartment building projects in the decade of 1950, completely depleting the available land in the district.

The Deusto Bridge, a moveable bridge spanning the Bilbao estuary and connecting Deusto with Abando was constructed between 1932 and 1936. During the Francoist dictatorship it was renamed Bridge of the Generalissimo. Its name was changed back to Deusto in the late 1970s. In 1968 a canal was excavated connecting to the estuary on its northwestern side, with the aim of relieving the vessel traffic on the river. This canal became known as the Deusto Canal, and the newly created peninsula was named Zorrotzaurre. This peninsula would later become an artificial island, following the completion of the Zorrotzaurre Master Plan designed by architect Zaha Hadid. As part of the Plan, the canal was finished and officially opened on 8 October 2018, making the former peninsula become an island.

== Geography ==
Deusto is located on the right bank of the estuary of Bilbao, on a plain between the river and nearby mountains. It borders to the north with Mount Artxanda, a natural border between the city of Bilbao and the neighbouring municipalities of Erandio and Sondika. To the east it borders the district of Uribarri, Abando to the south and Basurtu-Zorrotza to the west. Deusto has a total area of 4.95 square kilometres (2 sq mi).

=== Subdivisions ===
Politically and administratively, the district of Deusto is subdivided into four quarters (Basque: auzo), although it is common for locals to refer to even smaller subdivisions. The quarters are Arangoiti, Ibarrekolanda, San Ignazio-Elorrieta and Deustu Doneperiaga-Deustuibarra. While Zorrotzaurre is administratively part of Deustu Doneperiaga-Deustuibarra, it is often considered as a separate entity due to its particular conditions.

Map / Name; / Arangoiti

Map / Name; / Ibarrekolanda

Map / Name; / San Ignazio-Elorrieta

Map / Name; / Deustu Doneperiaga-Deustuibarra

== Infrastructure ==
=== Education ===
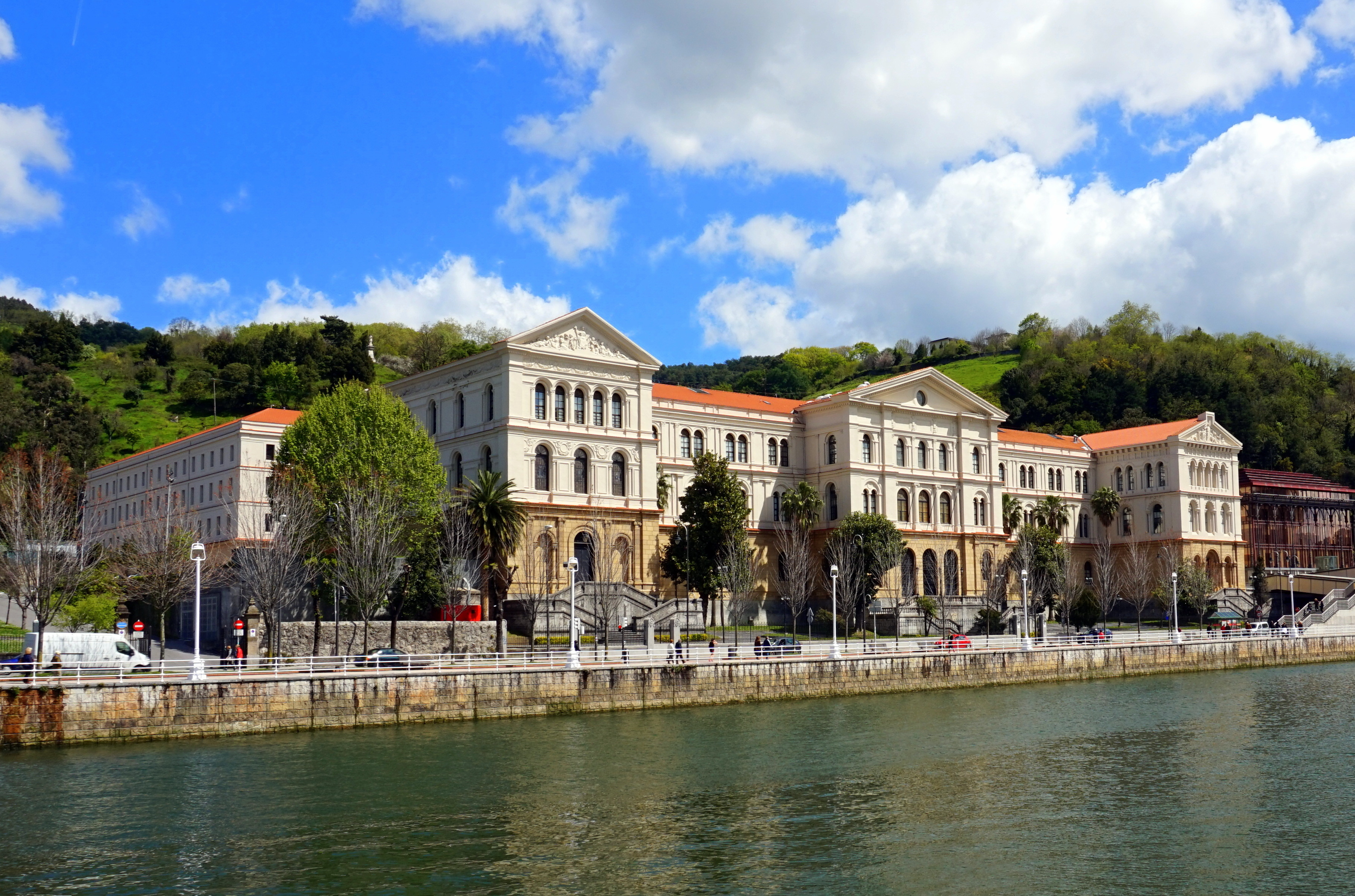
Main building of the University of Deusto.

The district of Deusto is popularly known as Bilbao's university district. It contains the main campus of the University of Deusto, a private university owned by the Society of Jesus, a religious order of the Catholic Church. The university was founded in 1886, after the Jesuits moved their School of Higher Studies from Laguardia to its present site in Deusto. Since its establishment, the university has played a role in the industrial development of Bilbao and its metropolitan area. Its main campus building was designed by the Spanish architect Francisco de Cubas and was the largest building in the city when it opened.

Also in Deusto is the Faculty of Economics and Business of the University of the Basque Country, located next to Sarriko park in the Ibarrekolanda quarter. The faculty was founded in 1955 as the Faculty of Economic Sciences and adopted its current name in 2015. The European campus of the DigiPen Institute of Technology is located on Zorrotzaurre island.

Deusto also contains the Juan Crisóstomo de Arriaga music conservatory, the city's main music academy. The district is home to the municipal Official School of Languages and the British Council. Private religious schools, including those run by the Salesians and the La Salle, are also located in the district.

=== Healthcare ===
There are two public district health centers in the district, part of the Osakidetza network. They are located in the Deustu Doneperiaga and San Ignazio-Elorrieta quarters. Located in the Deustuibarra quarter is the main hospital of Igualatorio Médico Quirúrgico (IMQ), a private healthcare provider.

=== Sports ===
The district has two municipal sport facilities, one in Deustu Doneperiaga-Deustuibarra and the other in San Ignazio-Elorrieta. The Deusto Sports Center (Polideportivo de Deusto) is located by the Euskalduna Bridge and the Bilbao estuary and was opened in 1987. Women's amateur football club San Ignacio KE and men's club SD Deusto (with a history going back to 1913) are based there.

=== Parks and gardens ===
The park of Sarriko, in the Ibarrekolanda quarter, is the largest of the district. Deusto has plazas and small parks scattered around its quarters, such as the Deustu Park by the Bidarte Palace, the San Pedro Plaza by the old church and the Hermano Gárate gardens by the university. The riverside includes more than three kilometres of walkways alongside the river, starting in Botikazar street by the university and continuing alongside the estuary up until Elorrieta. Many of these areas have been recently refurbished and renewed as part of the Zorrotzaurre Master Plan urban intervention.

=== Transport ===
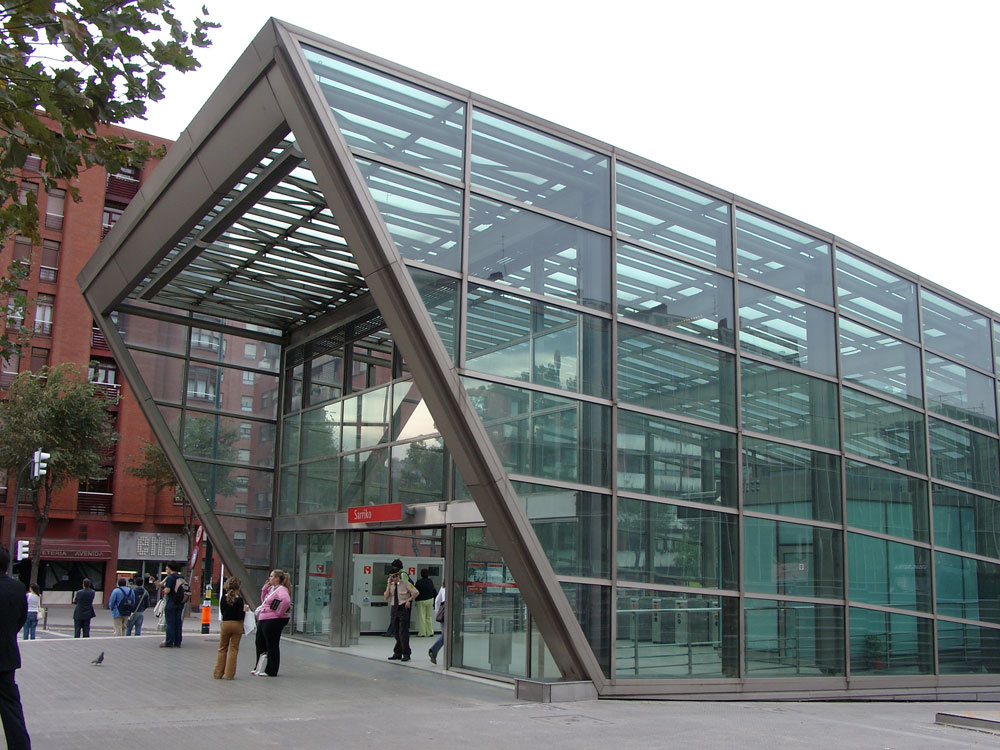
Sarriko metro station.

The district is serviced by the Bilbao Metro's Lines 1 and 2, with three stations: Deustu, Sarriko and San Ignazio. This underground system was opened in 1995 replacing the regional railway system Bilbao-Las Arenas railway, which started operations in the late 19th century. This narrow-gaude railway service had four stations across the district, Universidad (by the University of Deusto), Deusto, Ibarrekolanda and San Ignacio; after the opening of the metro system this overground track was shut down, although service was maintained between Deusto and the Casco Viejo station operated by Euskotren. The service was finally suspended in 2010 and the remaining Deusto and Universidad stations closed down.

The district is served by numerous local Bilbobus lines connecting to elsewhere in the city and particularly to Abando and the city centre. The regional buses Bizkaibus serve several stops across the district, connecting to the main University of the Basque Country campus in Leioa and other cities on the right bank of the estuary. According to the Zorrotzaurre Master Plan, an extension of the Bilbao tram is expected to traverse the new Zorrotzaurre island, with four stations planned.

Lehendakari Aguirre Avenue, named after the first Basque president José Antonio Aguirre, is the main avenue traversing the district, connecting the Deusto Bridge area all the way to Elorrieta across Ibarrekolanda and San Ignazio. The regional road BI-604 starts at Deusto, connecting with the Asua valley across mount Artxanda, whereas from Saint Pius X square there are connections to the BI-625 regional road towards east Bilbao and the Artxanda-Ugasco tunnels towards the Bilbao Airport.

=== Deusto Canal ===
The Deusto Canal is the district's main waterway after the estuary itself, separating the Erribera quarter into two sections; the riverside proper and the Zorrotzaurre island. It is an artificial canal whose construction began in 1950, although the original project dates the early 20th century. The canal was intended to relieve maritime traffic in the estuary by serving as docks for the industrial activities that then were common in the Deusto riverside. The canal served its original purpose until 2006, when the construction of the new outer Port of Bilbao was completed. The last ship to depart from the Deusto docks was the vessel Fri River, carrying laminated steel.

The original project intended the canal to connect directly Elorrieta with the Euskalduna shipyards, transforming Zorrotzaurre into an artificial island, however the construction was stopped before completion, leaving Zorrotzaurre as a peninsula instead. Following the Zorrotzaurre Master Plan designed by architect Zaha Hadid, a key element in the configuration of Zorrotzaurre and the Deusto riverside as new residential areas, works to finally complete the canal resumed in 2014 and was completed in 2018.

=== Bridges ===
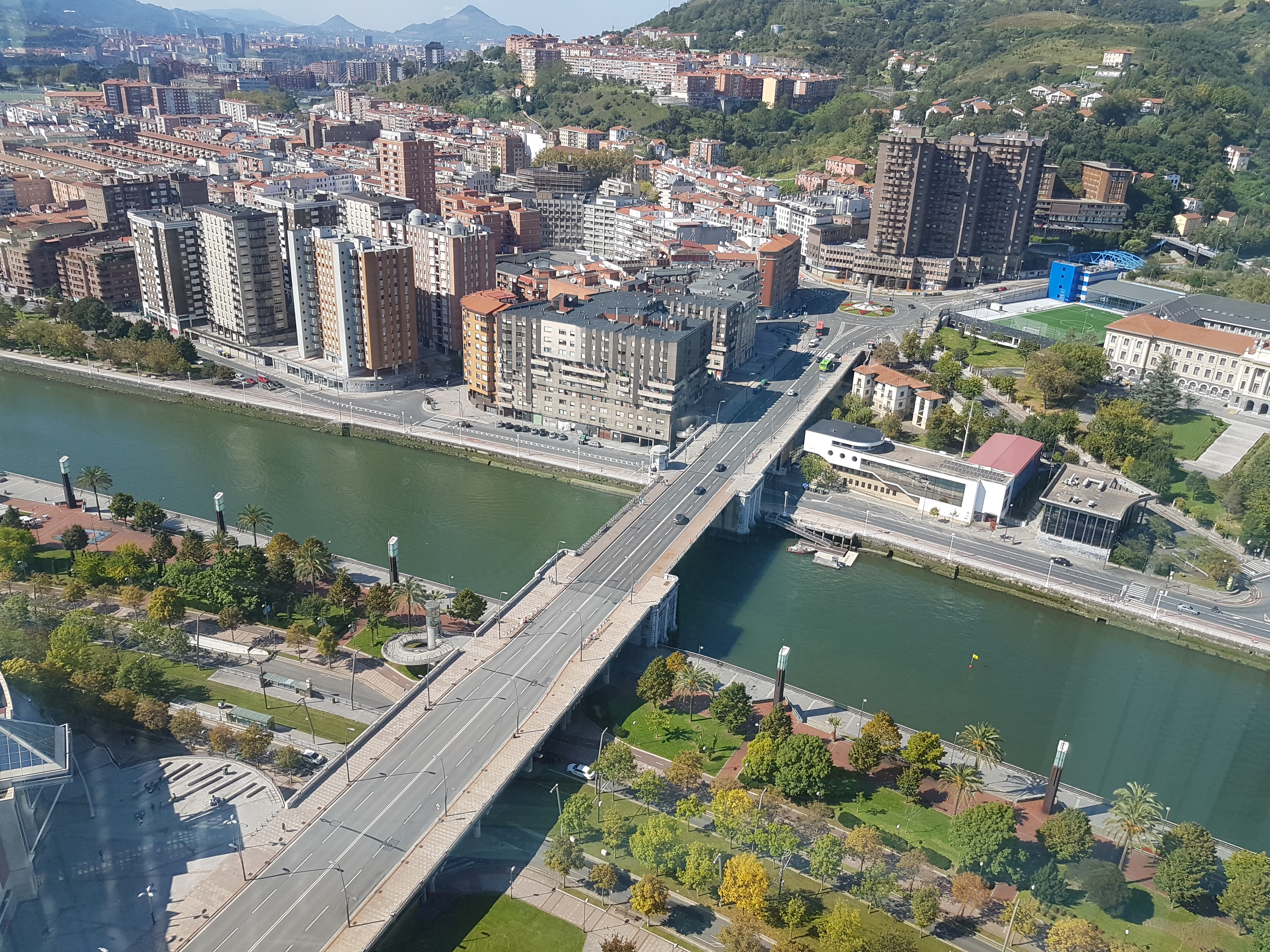
Deusto Bridge spanning the Bilbao estuary.

There are four bridges in the district, three crossing the estuary and one crossing the canal. The Deusto Bridge is the oldest, built in 1936 as a result of the necessity of directly connecting Abando with the districts annexed to Bilbao a decade earlier. It is a bascule bridge designed by architect Ricardo Bastida and inspired in the moveable bridges of Chicago, in the United States. It was blown up less than a year after being finished, during the Spanish Civil War and reconstructed again in 1937.

The Euskalduna Bridge was the second bridge to cross the estuary in Deusto, opened in 1997 and designed by civil engineer Javier Manterola. It is a viaduct connecting the Sagrado Corazón de Jesús square with the Deusto riverside, using the land formerly occupied by Euskalduna shipyards, hence the name. The third bridge constructed is the pedestrian Pedro Arrupe walkway, named after Jesuit priest Pedro Arrupe and connects the modern Abandoibarra area of Abando directly to the University of Deusto campus.

The fourth bridge to be constructed in Deusto is the Frank Gehry Bridge, crossing the Deusto Canal and connecting the Deusto riverside to Zorrotzaurre. It was opened in 2015 and named after architect Frank Gehry, who designed the Guggenheim Museum Bilbao. Currently under construction is the San Ignazio-Zorrotzaurre bridge, the second bridge spanning the Deusto Canal and connecting the San Ignazio quarter with the island. It is expected to be finished and open to traffic in 2020 and will be named after a relevant female figure.

== Notable people ==
- Yolanda González (1961-1980), murdered communist student

== Sights ==
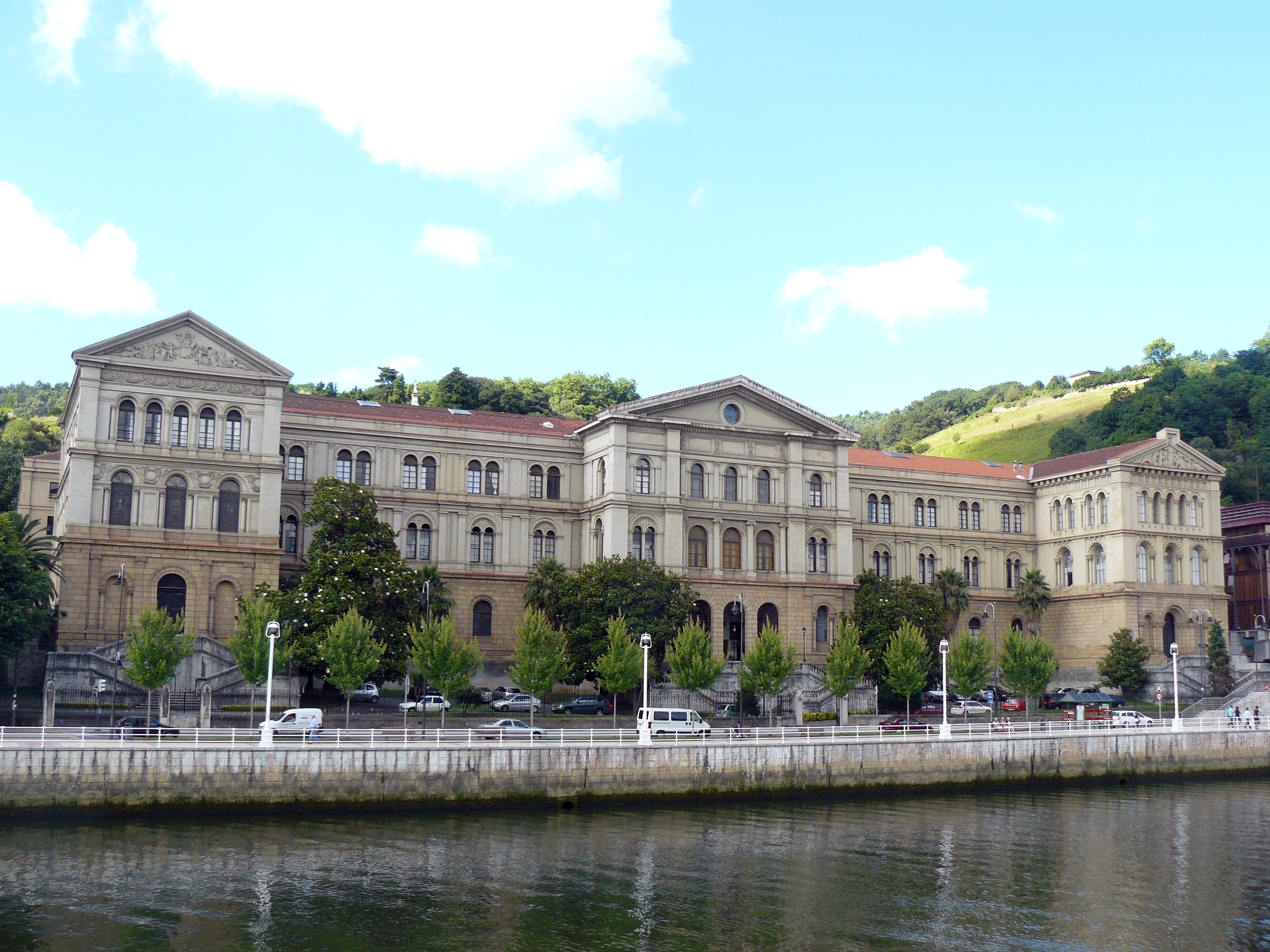
University of Deusto

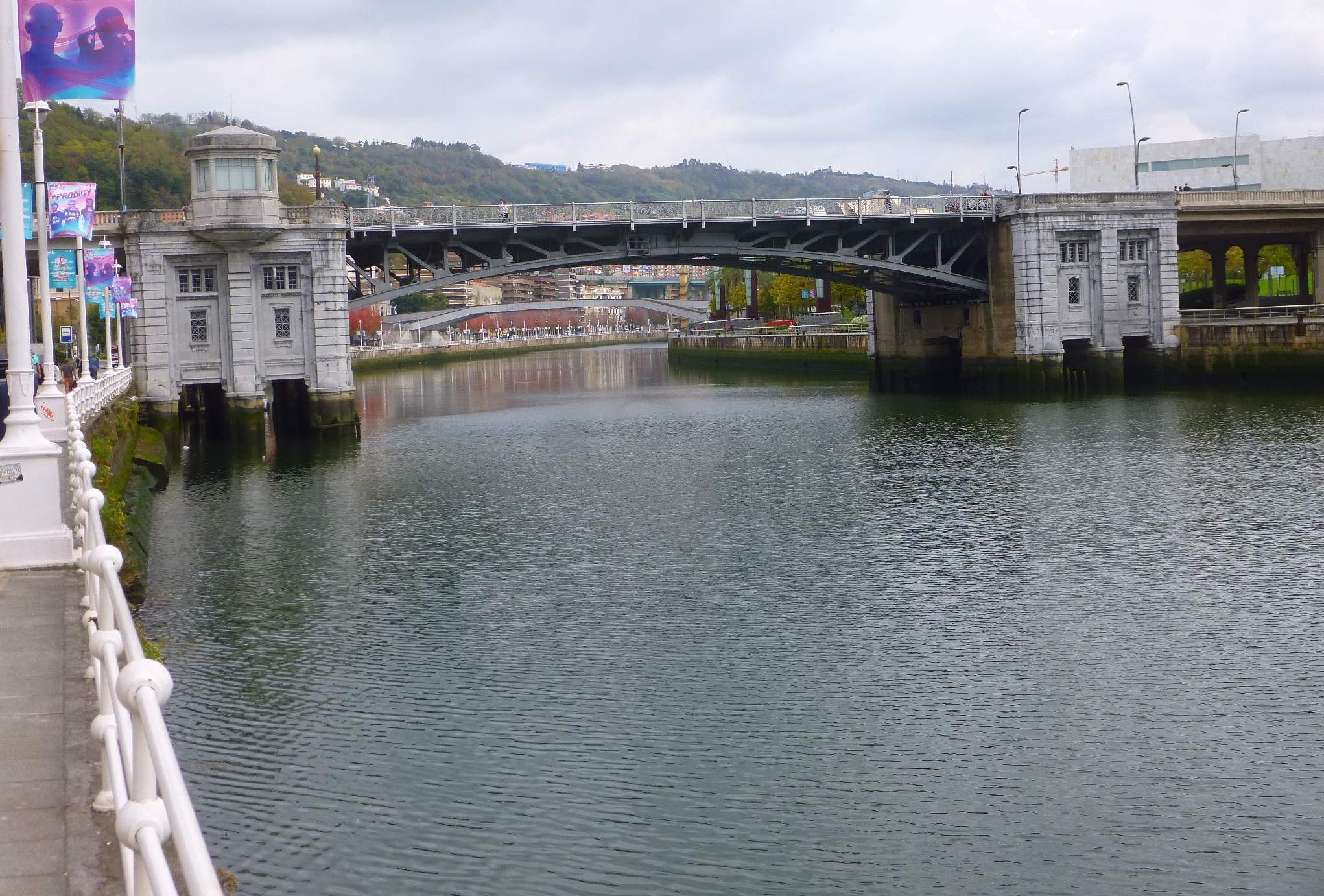
Deusto Bridge

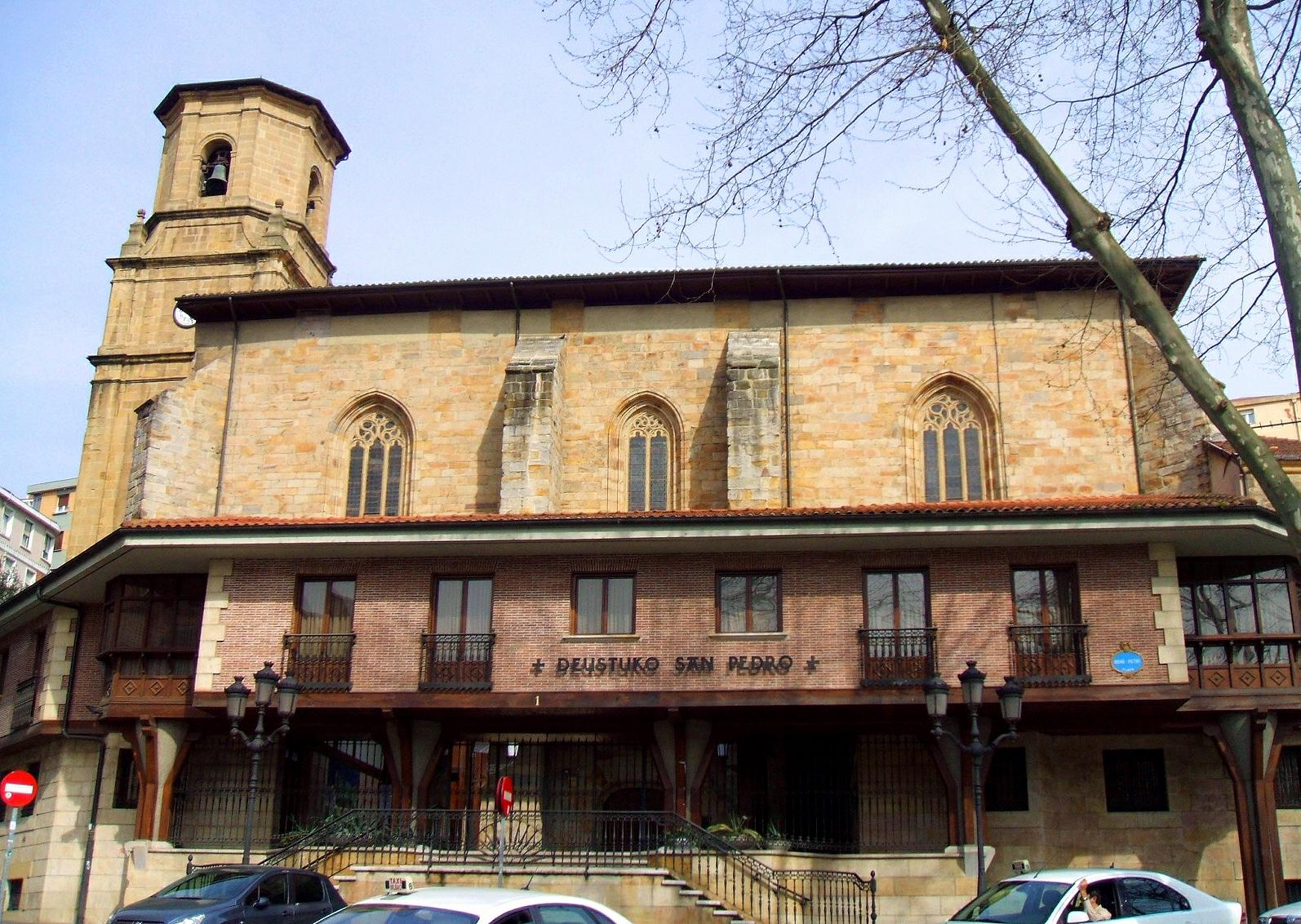
San Pedro de Deusto Church

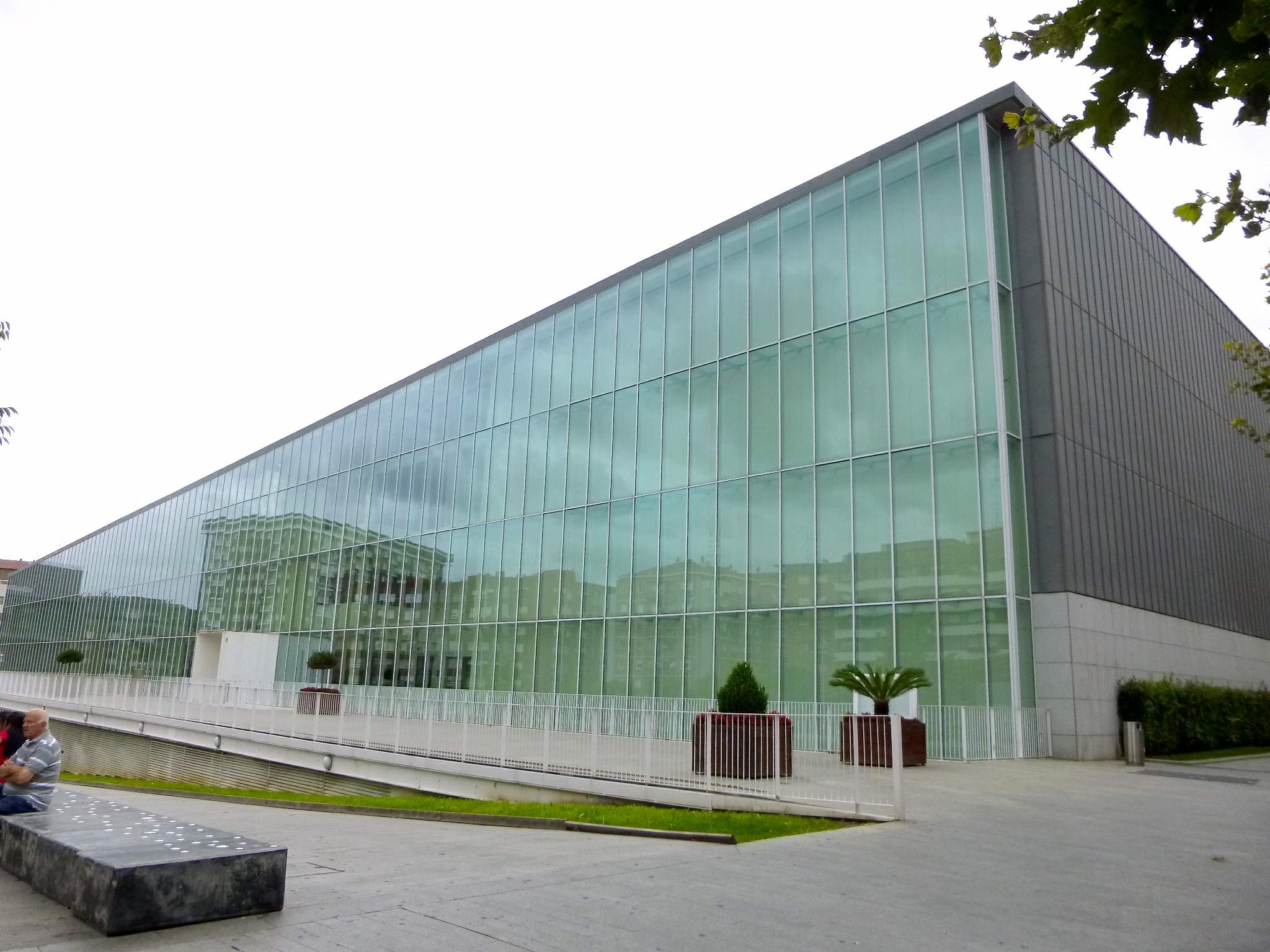
Music Conservatory Juan Crisóstomo de Arriaga

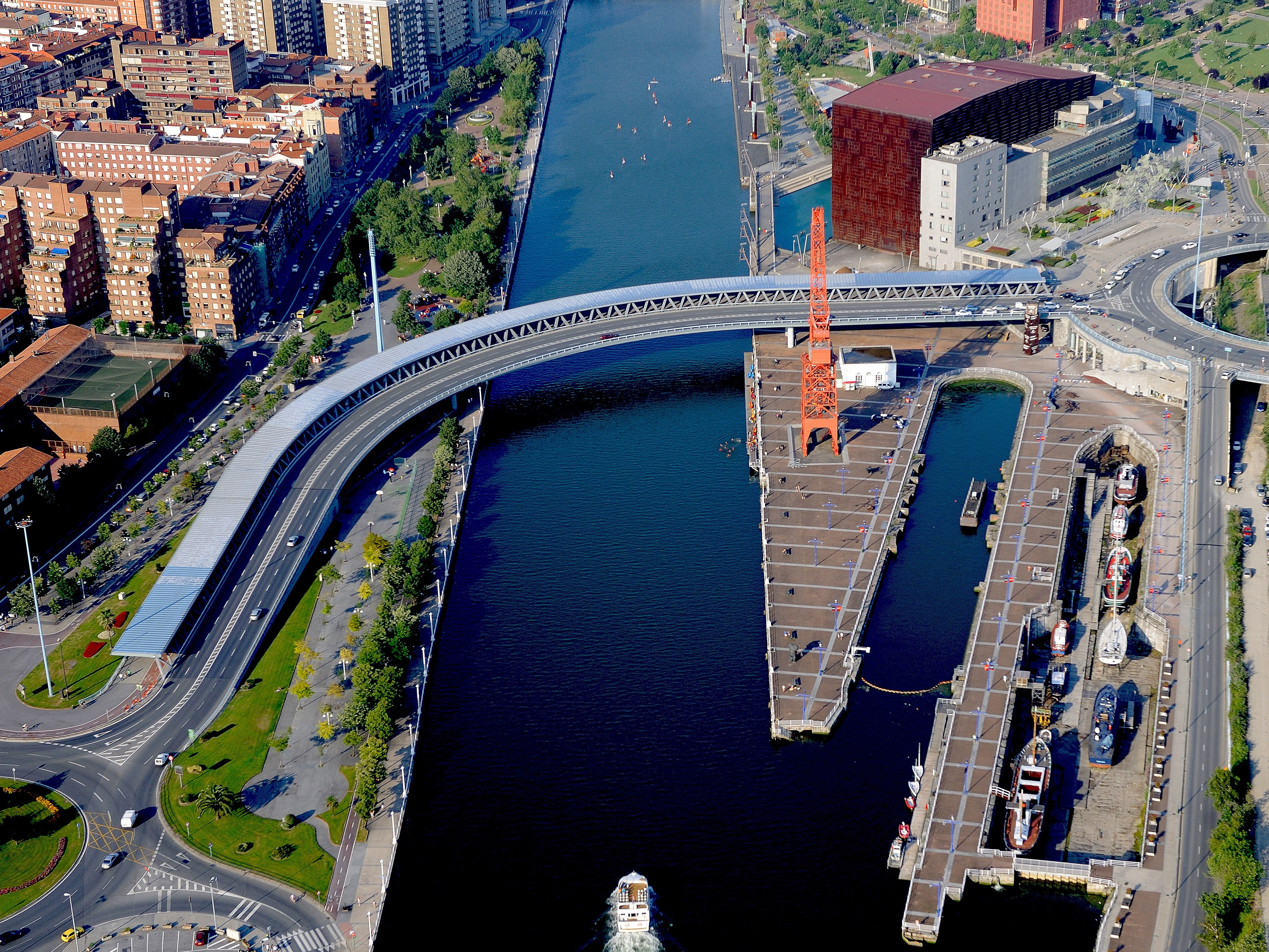
Euskalduna Bridge

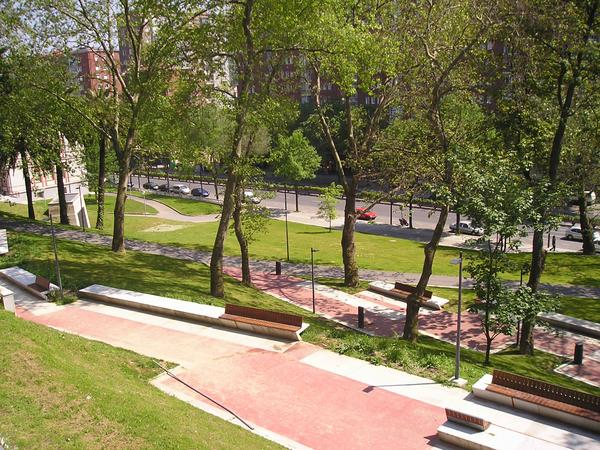
Bidarte Park

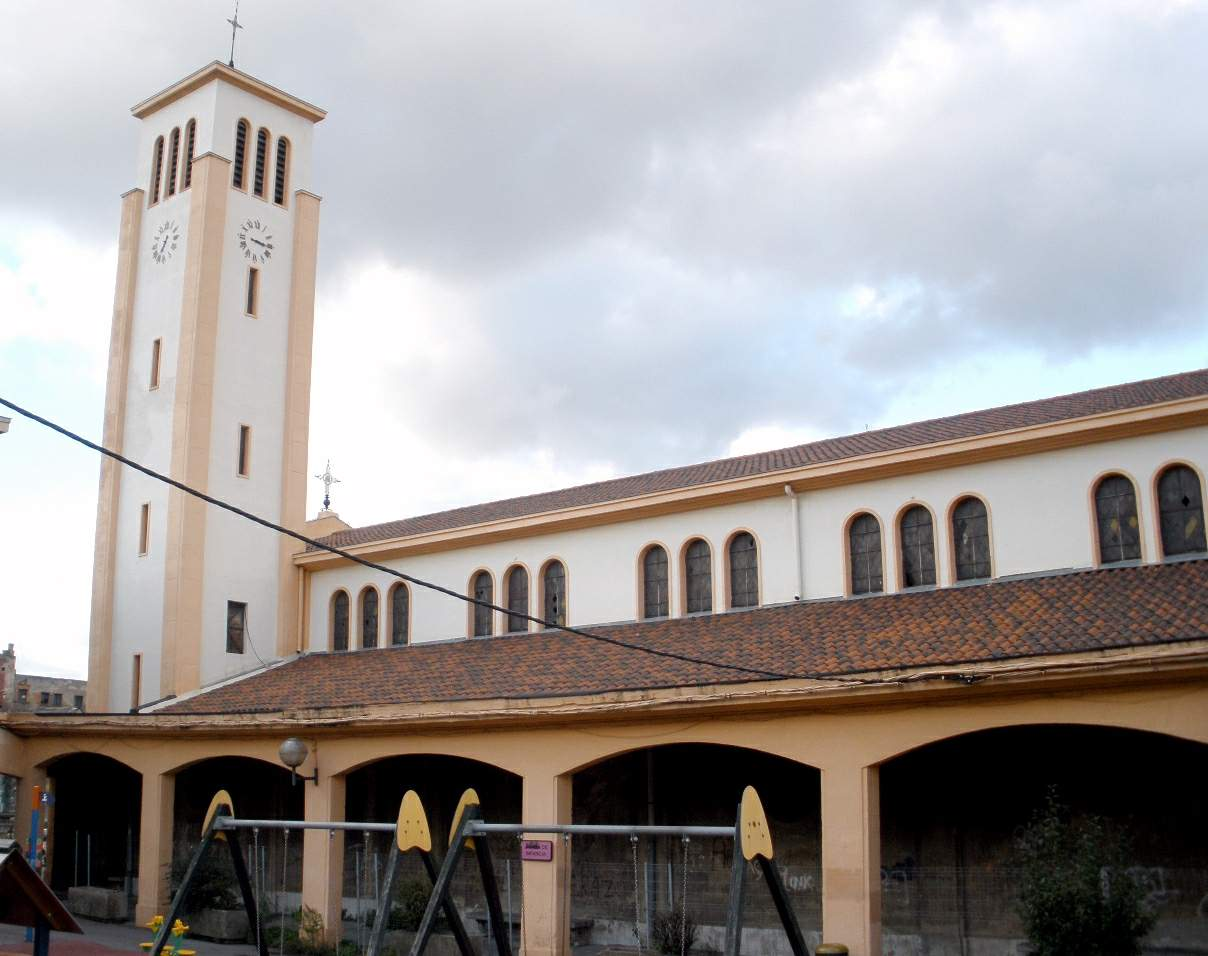
San Pablo Church

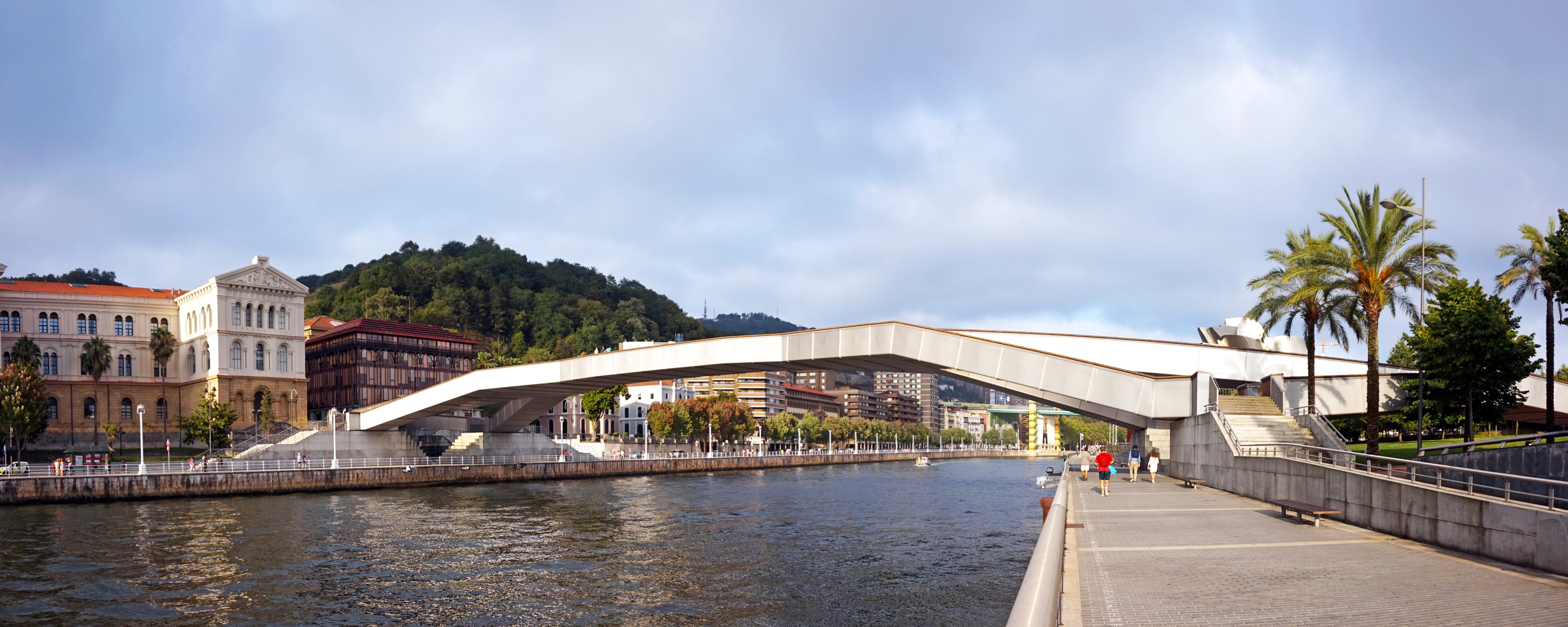
Pedro Arrupe walkway
