= Deusto Bridge =

Deusto Bridge Puente de Deusto
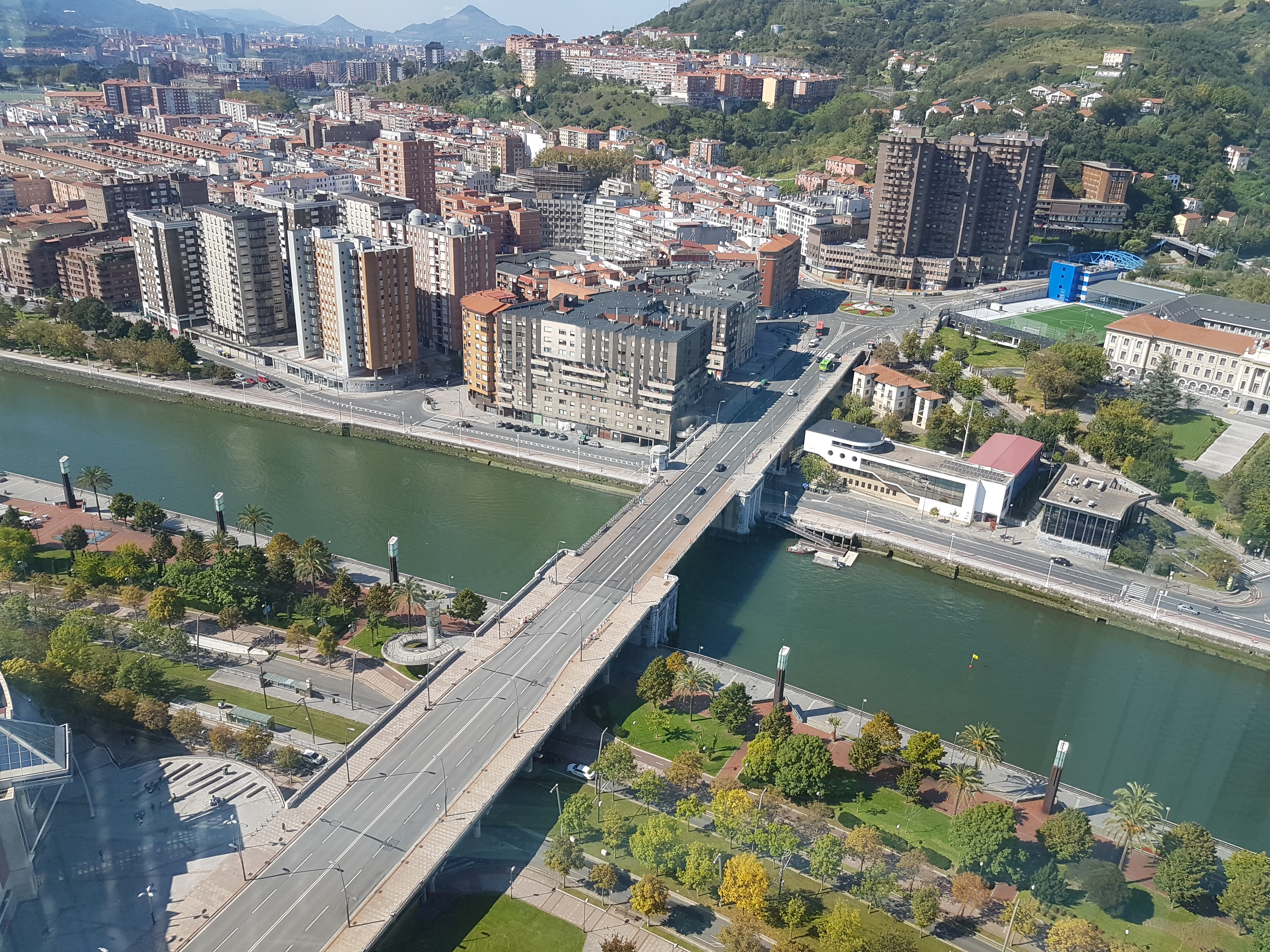
- Coordinates: 43°16′11″N 2°56′26″W
- Crosses: Estuary of Bilbao
- Locale: Bilbao, Spain
- ID number: Q3396958

Characteristics
- Total length: 500 metres (1,600 ft)
- Width: 25 metres (82 ft)

History
- Architect: Ricardo Bastida; Ignacio de Rotaeche; José Ortiz de Artiñano

Location
- Interactive map of Deusto Bridge

The Deusto Bridge (Spanish: Puente de Deusto) is a bascule bridge over the estuary of Bilbao. This bridge connects the districts of Abando and Deusto.

== History ==
The bridge was inaugurated In December 1936, it had been commissioned to the engineers Ignacio de Rotaeche and José Ortiz de Artiñano in 1931. The bridge was built to connect the historic center of Bilbao with the newly incorporated districts of Deusto, Begoña. and Abando over the estuary.

The Deusto Bridge and the City Hall Bridge were designed similarly to those in Chicago to ensure the passage of ships. During the mayoralty of Federico Moyúa, architect Ricardo Bastida was tasked with the construction of the bridges. Bastida studied cantilever and tilt bridges in Chicago and chose the Michigan Avenue Bridge as reference.

Engineers Ignacio de Rotaeche and José Ortiz de Artiñano together with architect Ricardo Bastida signed the initial project in January 1930. This project was approved on 23 July 1931 and construction began a year later. The bridge was inaugurated on December 7 and finished on 12 December 1936, after four years of work and two modifications.

The bridge was destroyed on 18 June 1937 during the Spanish Civil War and was rebuilt between 1938 and 1939 by the Francoist authorities. It reopened on 25 October 1939 under the name of Generalissimo Bridge (referring to Francisco Franco) during the mayoralty of José María Oriol Urquijo. It returned to its original name in 1979.

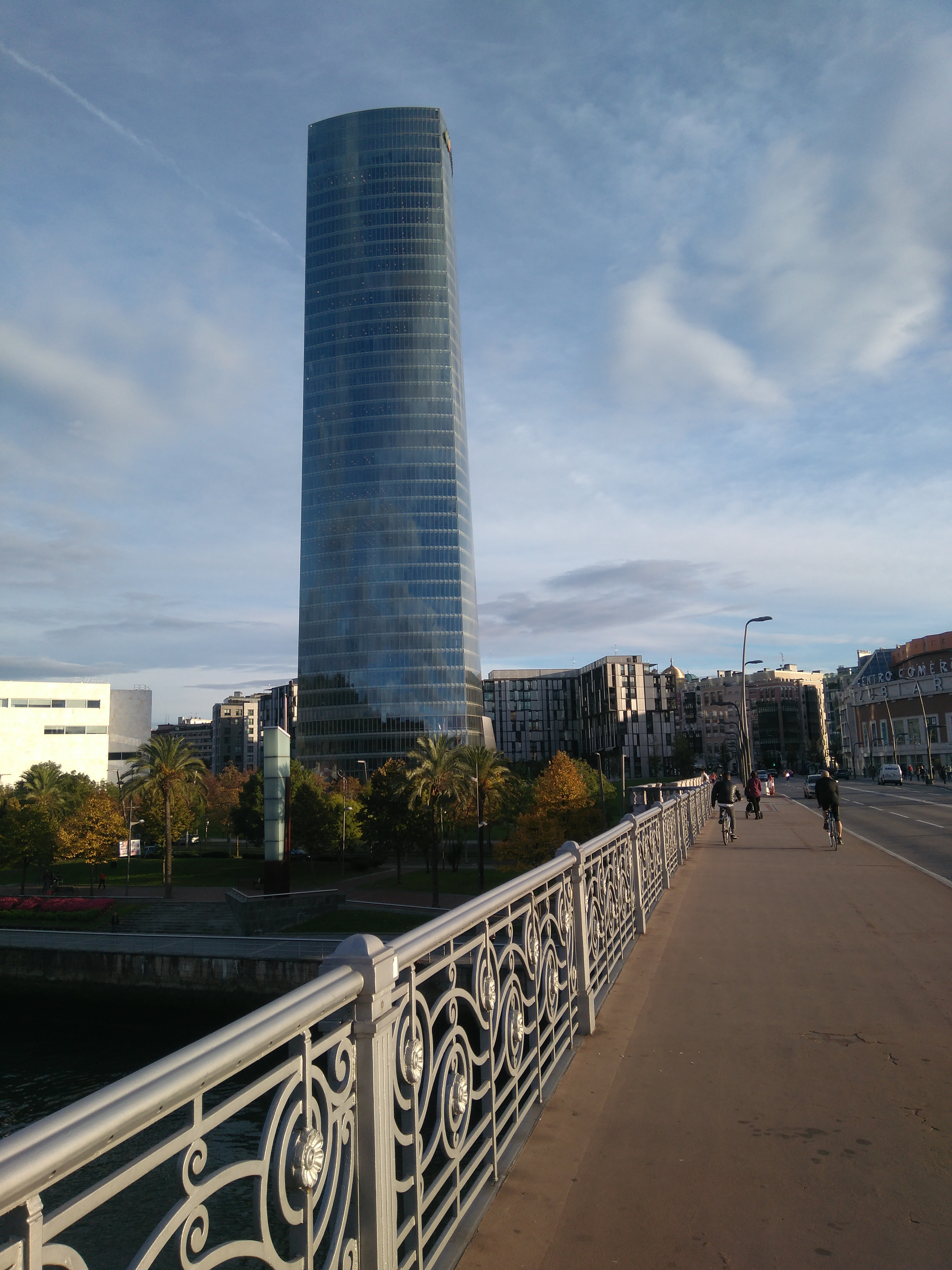
View of the Iberdrola Tower from the Deusto Bridge

Until 1992, stable traffic of ships was maintained, which made it necessary to open the bridge. Its last commercial opening was on 4 May 1995, which made way for a ship of the shipping company Pinillos. The construction of the Euskalduna Bridge, with a clearance lower than that of the Deusto Bridge, prevented the passage of larger boats and made it unnecessary to open the bridge. The welding and definitive immobilization of the bridge were considered, and it was decided to keep the bridge active so that it could be opened for commemorations and festivities. The last opening was held in March 2008, which made way for the 28th edition of the Regata Ingenieros-Deusto rowing competition.

In October 2008, the Bilbao City Council published its plan for a comprehensive restoration. The works, scheduled for the following year, were aimed at comprehensive sanitation, fine-tuning of the lifting machinery and installation of a new lighting system, as well as a change in the corresponding pedestrian pathway. In the study prior to the restoration, it was detected that the railing, designed by Ricardo Bastida, deteriorated poorly. The council opted for the restoration and replacement of the railing, which required replicas of it to be made. The replacement has been made with identical elements made of stainless steel. The color is altered, from green to silver, and the handrail now houses a LED lighting system. The pavement of the bridge has been asphalted with a mixture of resin-based and aggregates in a pinkish tone, which ruled out the imitation of wood originally planned.

== Characteristics & specifications ==
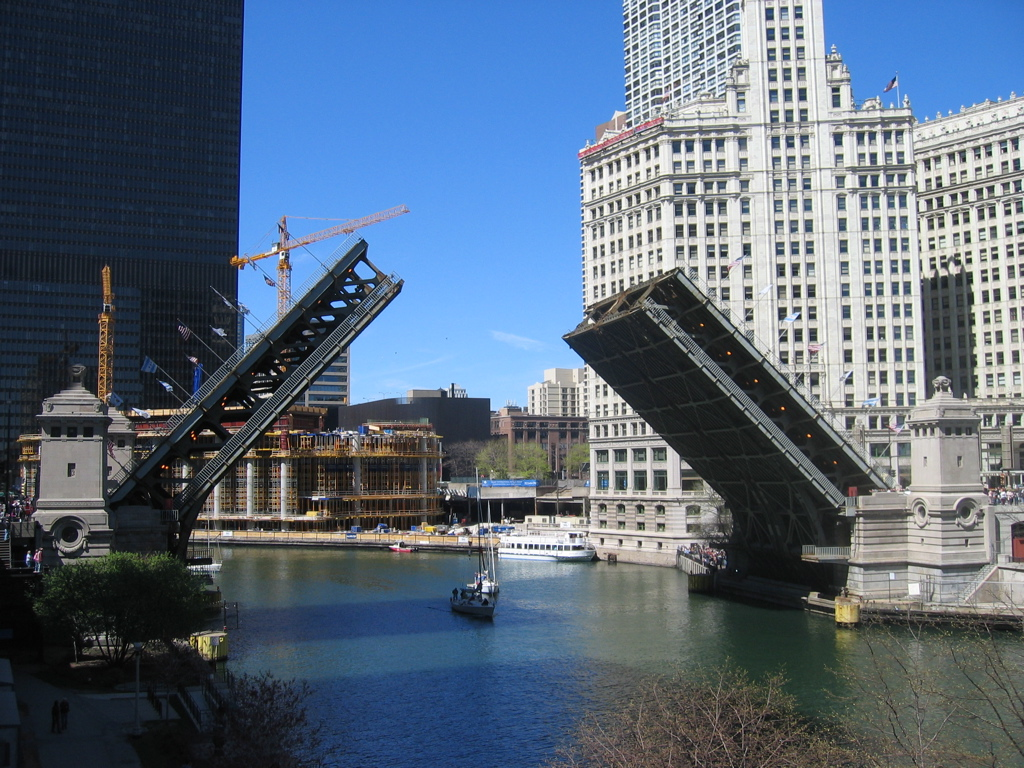
The Michigan Avenue Bridge in Chicago served as the inspiration for the design of the Deusto Bridge.

The total length of the bridge is 500 metres (1,600 ft) with a span of 48 metres (157 ft), it narrows the channel of the estuary, which is approximately 71 metres (233 ft) with concrete buildings on each side, where the lifting mechanism is located. The clearance at high tide is 7.96 metres (26.1 ft). The bridge tilt until reaching a horizontal angle of 70º.

== See also ==
- City Hall Bridge
