= Abandoibarra =

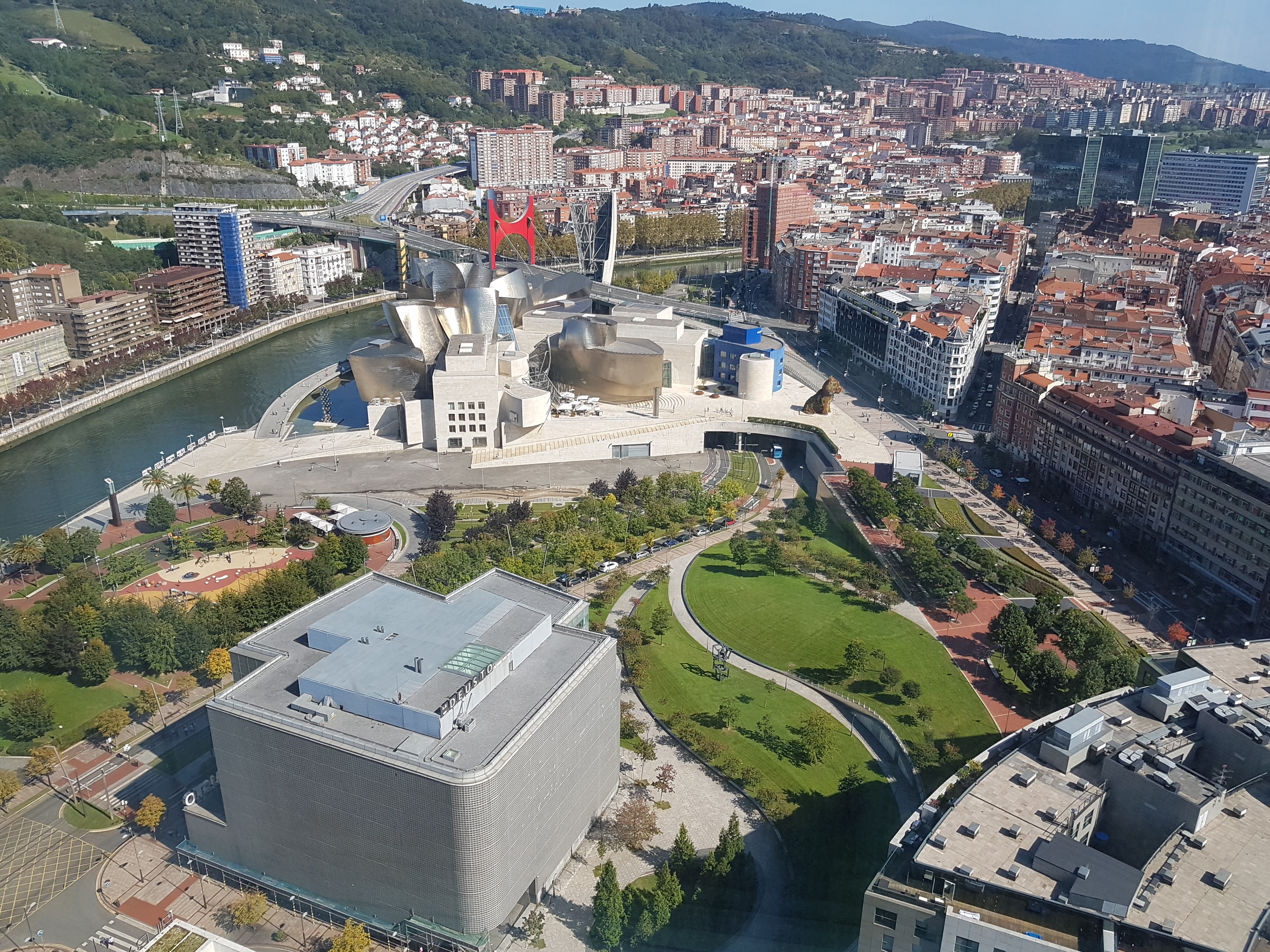
Panoramic view of Abandoibarra with the Guggenheim Museum from the Iberdrola Tower.

Abandoibarra (in Basque, Abando and ibar, "Abando valley") is an area of the city of Bilbao, Spain, located next to the estuary in the neighborhood of Abando. After the process of deindustrialization experienced by the town since the mid-1990s, Abandoibarra became the central axis of urban regeneration in the city, continuing today in Zorrotzaurre.

== Buildings ==
Abandoibarra has built many buildings of great importance to Bilbao, such as the following:

- Isozaki Atea (architect Arata Isozaki).
- Museoalde building (Agvar Arquitectos and Axis Arquitectura y Urbanismo).
- Guggenheim Museum Bilbao (architect Frank Gehry).
- Library of the University of Deusto (architect Rafael Moneo).
- Auditorium of the UPV/EHU (architect Álvaro Siza).
- Iberdrola Tower (architect César Pelli).
- Block of dwellings of Eugenio Aguinaga.
- Blocks of houses of Carlos Ferrater.
- Etxargi building by César Portela.
- Artklass building by Rob Krier.
- Residential Parkeder (architects Iskander Atutxa and Jon Urrutikoetxea).
- Housing on Lehendakari Leizaola street (architect Luis Peña Ganchegui).
- Hotel Meliá Bilbao (architect Ricardo Legorreta).
- Zubiarte Shopping Center (architect Robert Stern).
- Euskadi Square (architect Diana Balmori).
- Euskalduna Palace (architects Federico Soriano and architect Dolores Palacios).
