= Azkuna Zentroa =

- Alhóndiga Municipal de Bilbao
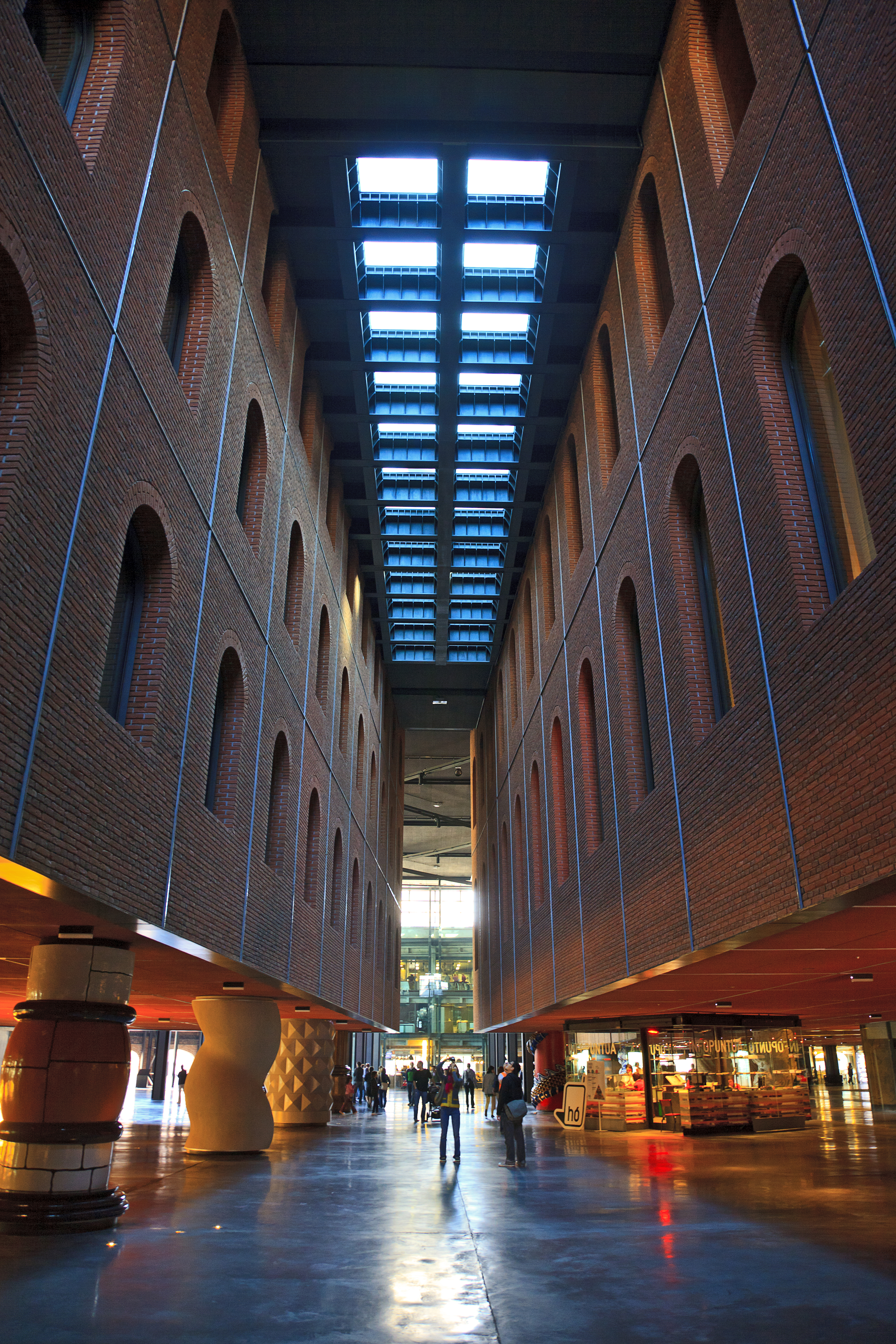
- Inside Azkuna Zentroa.
- Interactive map of the Azkuna Zentroa area

General information
- Type: Multi-purpose venue
- Architectural style: Modernism
- Location: Bilbao, Basque Country, 4, Arriquibar Square, Spain
- Coordinates: 43°15′35″N 2°56′13″W
- Construction started: 1905
- Completed: 1909
- Renovated: 2001-2010
- Cost: 71 million euros

Technical details
- Floor area: 43,000 m^{2} (460,000 sq ft)

Design and construction
- Architect: Ricardo Bastida
- Other designers: Philippe Starck, Thibaut Mathieu

Website
- www.azkunazentroa.eus

Azkuna Zentroa (Basque for Azkuna Centre), previously known as Alhóndiga Bilbao (Spanish pronunciation: [aˈlondiɣa βilˈβao]), is a multi-purpose venue located in the city of Bilbao, Spain. It was designed by French designer Philippe Starck in collaboration with Thibaut Mathieu and was opened to the public in stages between 18 May and 24 October 2010. The venue, labeled as a "Culture and Leisure Centre", consist of a cinema multiplex, a fitness centre, a library, showrooms, an auditorium, shops, and a restaurant. In March 2015 its name was officially changed to Azkuna Zentroa in tribute to the late mayor of Bilbao Iñaki Azkuna.

Originally a wine market (alhóndiga in Spanish), it was designed by Basque architect Ricardo Bastida and inaugurated in 1909. However, in the 1970s, a new warehouse was planned and the Alhóndiga was abandoned. Several projects were suggested, ranging from public housing, a museum of modern art, or even demolishing the entire building, but all were scrapped. Finally, in 1994 it was decided to renovate it and build a sports and culture centre. The Basque Government decided to declare the building "Public Property of Cultural Interest" in 1999.
