= Aurelio Arteta =

Spanish painter

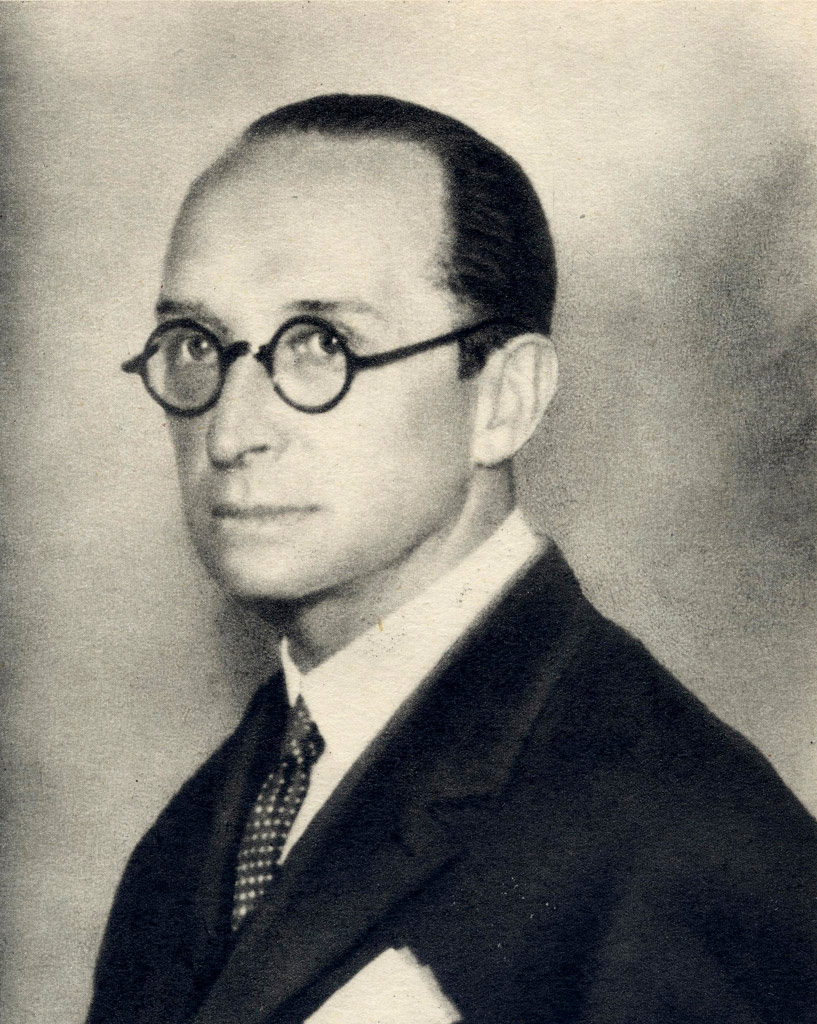
Aurelio Arteta (c.1920)

Aurelio Arteta Errasti (2 December 1879 – 10 November 1940) was a Spanish painter who worked in several styles, including symbolism, cubism, and social realism. He is remembered mostly for his murals.

== Biography ==
Arteta was born in Bilbao; his father was a farmer and laborer. He began his artistic education at the School of Arts and Crafts in Bilbao. In 1894, his family moved to Valladolid, so his father could find work. After 1897, he attended the Real Academia de Bellas Artes de San Fernando in Madrid. To avoid putting a burden on his family's modest income, he worked at various odd jobs, mostly of an artistic nature, but also danced as a comparsa.

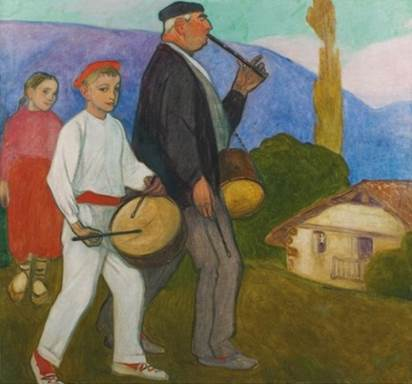
The Piper (1913)

Thanks to a grant from the Diputación Foral de Vizcaya, he was able to continue his studies abroad; first in Paris (1902), where he was influenced by Puvis de Chavannes, Gauguin and Toulouse-Lautrec; then Italy (1906), where he discovered Giotto and Raphael. That same year, he returned to Bilbao, opened a studio, and held his first exhibition. In 1911, he became one of the founders of the Basque Artists' Association.

In 1922, after a series of exhibitions, he painted his first murals at the new branch offices of the Banco de Bilbao in Madrid; twelve frescoes depicting the history of the Basque Country and the banking profession. From then on, he would be known primarily as a muralist. His second major mural was at the seminary chapel in Logroño; from designs by Ricardo Bastida.

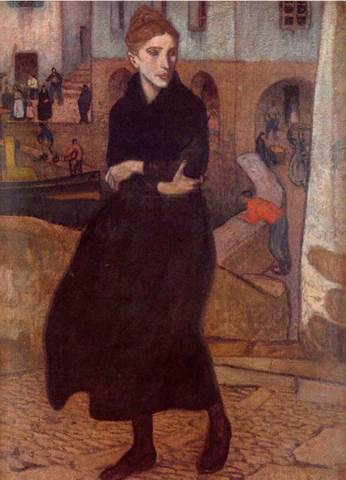
Fisherwoman at the Port (1915)

In 1924, he was appointed Director of the Bilbao Fine Arts Museum, but resigned three years later after the city of Bilbao censured some of his acquisitions. Spain's intellectuals came to his support which eventually led to a general criticism of cultural policies under the Primo de Rivera régime. He continued to exhibit and won several awards.

The beginning of the Spanish Civil War found him working as a Professor at the Escuela Técnica Superior de Madrid de Pintura. As a supporter of the Republican side, he found it necessary to move to Barcelona, by way of Valencia and, in 1938, left Spain for Biarritz. In 1940, when it appeared that France would fall to the Nazis, he chose to go into self-exile in Mexico.

When he arrived, he created what would be his last major work: decorations for the dining room of Indalecio Prieto. That November, following the execution of his friend, Julián Zugazagoitia, he and his wife were on their way to the country, to recover from their grief, when they were killed in a streetcar accident in Coyoacán.
