= Frank Gehry Bridge =

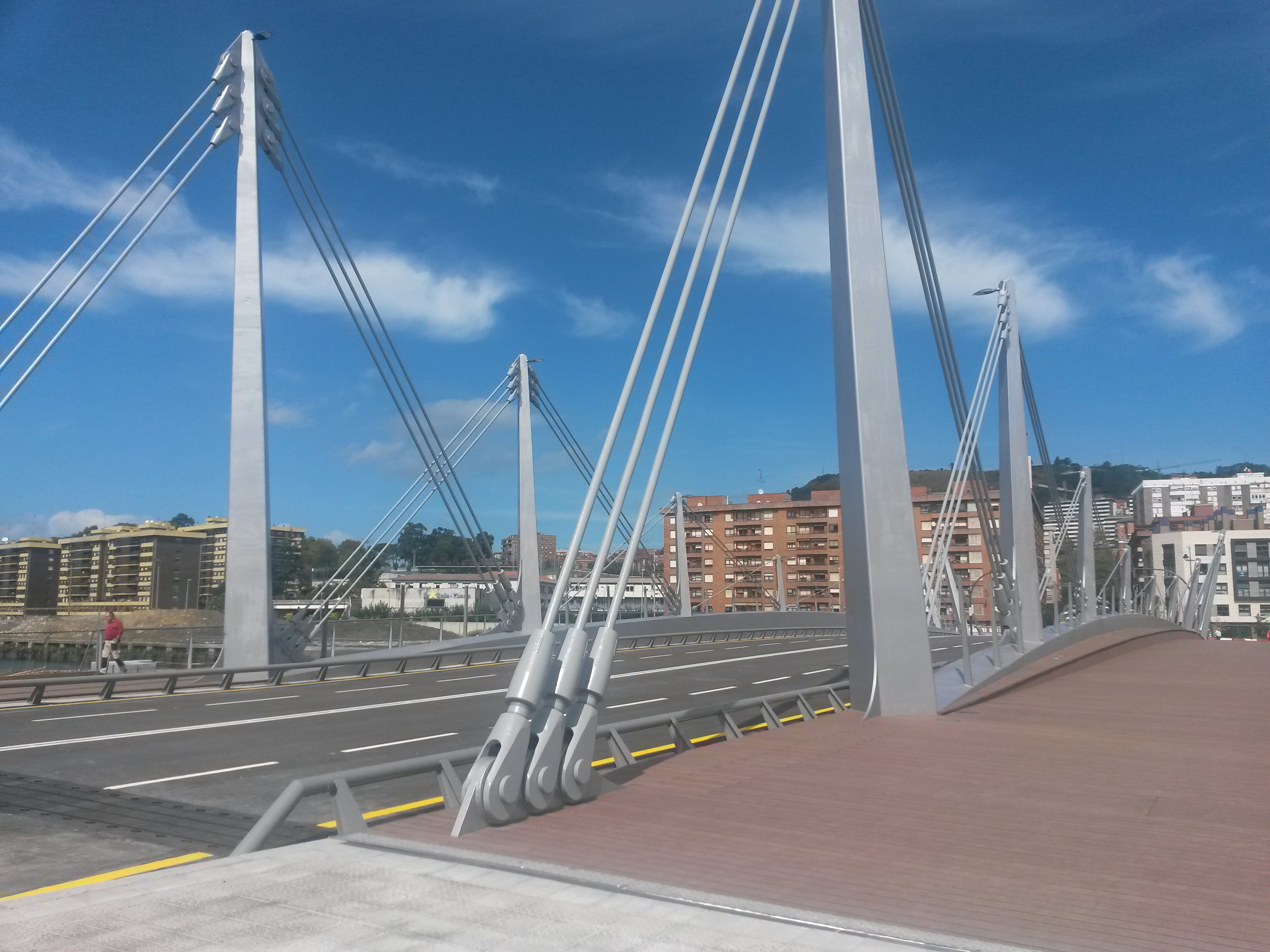
- Frank Gehry Bridge
- Coordinates: 43°16′3.799″N 2°57′16.430″W
- Carries: Motor vehicles, pedestrians and bicycles
- Official name: Frank Gehry Zubia (eu); Puente Frank Gehry (es)

Characteristics
- Total length: 75 m (246.1 ft)
- Width: 28 m (91.9 ft)

History
- Designer: Guillermo Capellán; Héctor Beade
- Construction start: 2014
- Construction end: 2015
- Opened: September 14, 2015

Location
- Interactive map of Frank Gehry Bridge

The Frank Gehry Bridge (Basque: Frank Gehry Zubia; Spanish: Puente Frank Gehry) is a bridge in Bilbao that connects Deusto and Zorrotzaurre. Its name is a tribute to Canadian-born American architect Frank Gehry, architect of the Guggenheim Museum Bilbao.
