= Ricardo Bastida =

Spanish architect (1879-1953)

- Born: 15 August 1879; Bilbao, Biscay, Spain
- Died: 15 October 1953 (aged 74); Bilbao, Biscay, Spain
- Occupation: Architect
- Spouse: Rosario Lecea (m. 1813–1853)
- Children: 8
- Buildings: Alhóndiga Bilbao, Bilbao; Banco de Bilbao, Madrid; Puente de Deusto, Bilbao; Casa Cuna, Bilbao; Casa Lezama-Leguizamon, Bilbao

Ricardo Bastida (15 August 1879 in Bilbao, Spain – 15 October 1953) was a Basque architect who was instrumental behind many important buildings in Bilbao and Madrid. In 1923 he proposed a plan of extension of Bilbao to the mouth of Abra, a visionary project that would result in the current metropolitan area.

== Early life and education ==
Bastida was born in one of the primary neighbourhoods of Bilbao on 15 October 1879. His father, Luis de Bastida y Azcuenaga, studied a naval officer degree, but he worked as a Mathematics teacher in San Antonio School in Bilbao. His mother, Josefa Bilbao Landazuri, obtained the qualification of Master of Primary Education in 1867 and she gave birth to six children.

Thanks to his parents academic training, culture occupied an important role in the Bastida family. Ricardo, showed a great facility for drawing and excelled in Mathematics. He trusted his father to make many decisions, such as choice of profession. He completed his early studies in Achuri's Public Schools and Secondary School in "Plaza de las Auxiliares", where he met the famous painter Aurelio Arteta, with whom he developed a close friendship.

== Biography and career ==
- 1895-1901: In 1895, Ricardo received in the university district of Valladolid the high school title with a remarkable average of a grade of B in Arts and a grade of outstanding in Sciences. That same year he joined the School of Architecture of Barcelona. His love of photography started then. Snapshots were revealed by him in a small home lab.
- 1902-1904: During these years Ricardo ends, at the age of 22, his studies of architecture and he returns to Bilbao. Anxious and excited, he entered the studio of architect Severino de Achucarro, author, with Paul Alzola and Ernesto Hoffmeyer engineers, of the extension project of Bilbao 1876. In 1903 he incorporated into the municipality of the town as an assistant Achucarro. Bastida's collaboration with the Bilbao administration lasted 50 years. In 1904 the project of the enlargement of 1876 had limitations or lack of ambition that the same authors acknowledged during its execution. In order to find a better solution, the City Council held a public competition Bilbao expansion, which is presented jointly by Bastida and Pedro Guimón. Later, Bastida joined the teaching staff of the School of Arts and Crafts in Bilbao.

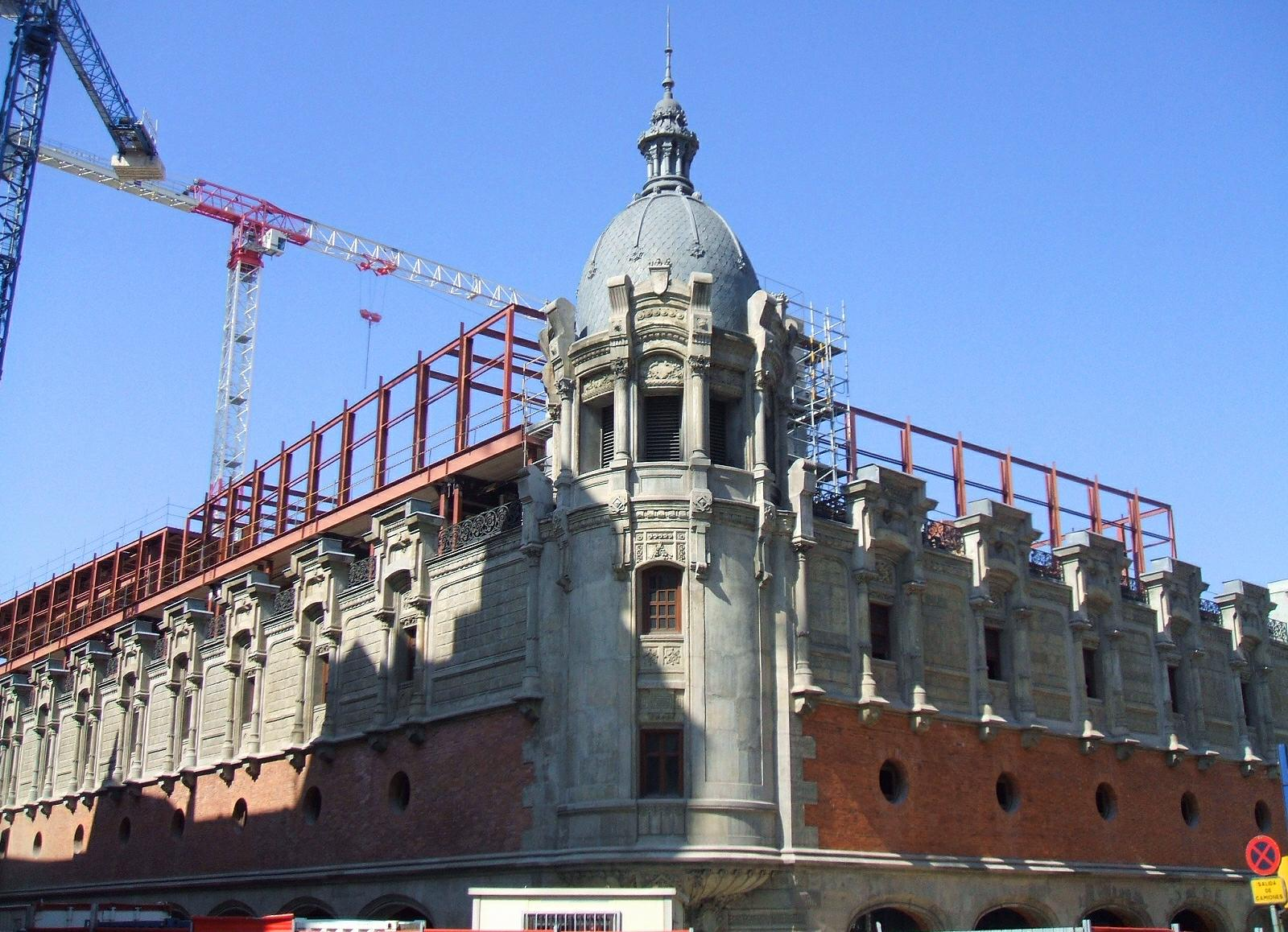
Alhóndiga Bilbao.

- 1905-1906: Bastida was commissioned to raise various public facilities. Commissioned by the town hall, he travelled in 1905 to develop comparative studies to different European cities: Hamburg, Bremen, Paris, Brussels, Antwerp ... When he returned, he projected the "Alhóndiga Municipal de Bilbao", "Lavaderos de la alameda de San Mamés" and "Calle Castaños". In those three buildings and in the disappeared cinema Olimpia made the nearest approach to modernism of his career. Despite the high costs involved of traveling in those years, Bastida went, throughout his life and on behalf of the town hall, to various centers in Europe and America. Thus he acquired an excellent cultural preparation that was completed with visits to museums, factories, hospitals, etc.
- 1907: Bastida was named Architect Head of Civil Construction of the City of Bilbao, a position he held until 1927. In this time interval he could devise some of the most relevant projects, many of which were not carried out because it had not obtained the final approval of the administrative bodies. He designed the "Parque del Ensanche" with the engineer Juan Eguiraun.
- 1908-1910: Bastida was still living with his parents and siblings. Later, José Uribe y Zarraonaindia asks for plans for a detached house in Ondarroa, a village of Biscay. Years later, the house passed to the architect, who used it as a summer residence. In 1909 the "Alhondiga Municipal de Bilbao" opened. The expansion of the city brought to its inhabitants cosmopolitan concerns, so the idea of holding an International Exhibition in Bilbao arises.
- 1911: Bastida took over the post of deputy director of the School of Arts and Crafts and Foremen. There he gave a series of lectures about the history of art. During the summer of 1911, his partner and friend Pedro Guimón encouraged Bastida to visit him at Ondarroa, where he spent the holidays. There, he was introduced to Rosario Lecea, which then became his wife. She was the daughter of a sea captain, she was born in Manila, the Philippine's capital. She lived in Ondarroa with her mother until his father's death in Singapore.
- 1912-1915: For professional reasons he went back to Europe to visit the School of Arts and Crafts in Geneva, Florence, Milan and Naples. He also undertook a study for the "Parque del Ensanche". On January 8, 1913, Ricardo Bastida and Rosario Lecea married. The religious ceremony was held in the parish of St. Mary of Ondarroa. Then, they went on their honeymoon to Paris, Zurich, Rome, Florence and other Italian cities. When they returned, they settled in the house of the architect of the street Ercilla. The couple had eight children: Ricardo, Juan Luis, Rosario, Jose María, María Victoria, Eloisa, Carmen and Teresa.In 1914, commissioned by the "Caja de Ahorros de Bilbao" Bastida ends the project "Casa Cuna de San Antonio", in Urazurrutia.After a year, in 1915, with population overflow, Bilbao could not cope with the defective schools. To alleviate the excess of admissions applications, Bastida projected, by order of the town hall, schools in Indautxu.
- 1916-1920: In 1916, Indalecio Prieto Tuero was elected councillor of the town hall in Bilbao . Despite ideological differences between Bastida and Prieto, they formed a deep friendship. They admired and respected each other, and they were united by a desire to improve the life of the society in which they lived. Later, in 1919, Bastida designed the branch of "Banco de Bilbao" in "Calle Alcalá".
- 1921-1922: Three walls of the detached house of Ondarroa were available for Aurelio Arteta to paint them. Arteta reflected scenes of Basque villages' religious festivities in blues and greens, which continued at that place until they were transferred to another support. Years later, in 1963, the children of the architect donated them to the "Museo de Bellas Artes de Bilbao". The house was demolished soon after. Regarding his hobbies in those years, in addition to cinema and photography, were simple. He really had little leisure time. Walking was the most practiced sport, as he moved walking everywhere when he was in Bilbao and in Ondarroa he went over Lekeitio or Mutriku, accompanied by their children. He also practiced rowing and bathing on the beach. In 1922 he completed the construction of "Torre Urizar" and headquarters of "Banco de Bilbao" in Madrid. In turn, he was named architect of the entity, a position he held until his death.
- 1925-1926: In March he presented the plans for the project "Enlaces de Bilbao con los Pueblos Colindantes", which featured a sketch in 1923. Also, he proposed to centralize railways and bus lines in one station located in Abando. In 1926, he participated in the international planning competition for the extension of Bilbao, making a group with Marcelino Odriozola. Emiliano Amann organized a U.S. tour which Bastida and his eldest son joined. The group visited different cities, such as New York, Philadelphia, Washington, Chicago and Detroit.
- 1927-1928: He presented two drafts for "Puente de Begoña", one mobile and the other fixed. That project and 1923's one, joined Abando and Deusto as mobile bridges that allowed the passage of ships. However, its high cost caused many misgivings.
- 1929-1932: The architect continued building detached houses in Ondategi. Bastida projected about twenty houses in Getxo, most commissioned by Sota. Moreover, in April 1932, the "Puente de Deusto" started to build.
- 1936-1937: Mobile bridges Deusto and town hall finally unite both sides of the river. But on the eve of the entry of the National Army in Bilbao (the June 19, 1937), the besieged command ordered to demolish the aforementioned bridges that had been so painstakingly built. On September 15, Ricardo, Bastida's eldest son and student of architecture, died in the war. Two days later, his funeral was held in Bilbao with the assistance of many people. Years later, the new mayor, Jose María de Areilza, commissioned Bastida the reconstruction of the movable bridges.
- 1938-1939: He reformed and expanded the first tuberculosis sanatorium building of Santa Maria, in Bilbao. In this, as in other religious or charitable work, he did not charge remuneration. As a result of hatreds and passions unleashed by the war and by the friendship he had with Prieto, Bastida suffered some records. He was not imprisoned, but suspended without salary and employment. Fortunately, the accusations were cleared, as the complainants themselves corrected their accusations and the architect, showing his goodness forgave them. After the civil war, Ricardo Bastida was 59 years old. Despite the hardships and affronts suffered, resumed his career with enthusiasm.
- 1940-1943: In 1941 he outlined a draft for other sanatorium in Santa Marina, now for tuberculous children. Also, he designed the "Estación Central de Autobuses" in Bilbao. A year later, he planned with Emiliano Amann social homes of Torre Madariaga. And in 1943 he built the "Iglesia del Buen Pastor" in Lutxana.
- 1947-1950: By this time two of his sons were married and the family kept the habit of spending the summer in Ondarroa. Grandchildren were new companions of the architect on his strolls and the subjects of his photographs and films. The eager temperament might suggest otherwise, but Bastida was jovial and friendly in dealing with people. Additionally, he practiced his hobbies until the last moment.
- 1951-1953: This year he was part of the jury of the contest to reform San Mames Stadium, of Athletic Club de Bilbao. In 1952, Bastida began remodeling the central headquarters of "Banco de Bilbao " on Gran Vía. In the summer of 1953 he received reports from Mexico about the poor health of his friend Prieto and decided to visit him. On the plane he fell ill and went to the airport in bad condition, so he suspended all scheduled. Prieto, concerned about the health of Bastida, looked after him at home . A few days later, the architect was strengthened and quickly returned to Bilbao. When he returned, he underwent surgery, but died shortly at : 15 October 1953 (Bastida was 74 years ). Prieto wrote in memory of architect an article called "Mi más querido amigo". These are some sentences of the article: " Mr. Bastida is one of the most distinguished Spanish architects and certainly one of the best men I have ever known ." And include the simplicity and humility of the architect, which was manifested in the plea he made before he died at his family: he asked to write in his obituary simply "Ricardo Bastida, Diocesan Architect", without adding even "Mr." or title of "Most illustrious" which he possessed by the positions that he had occupied.

== Works ==
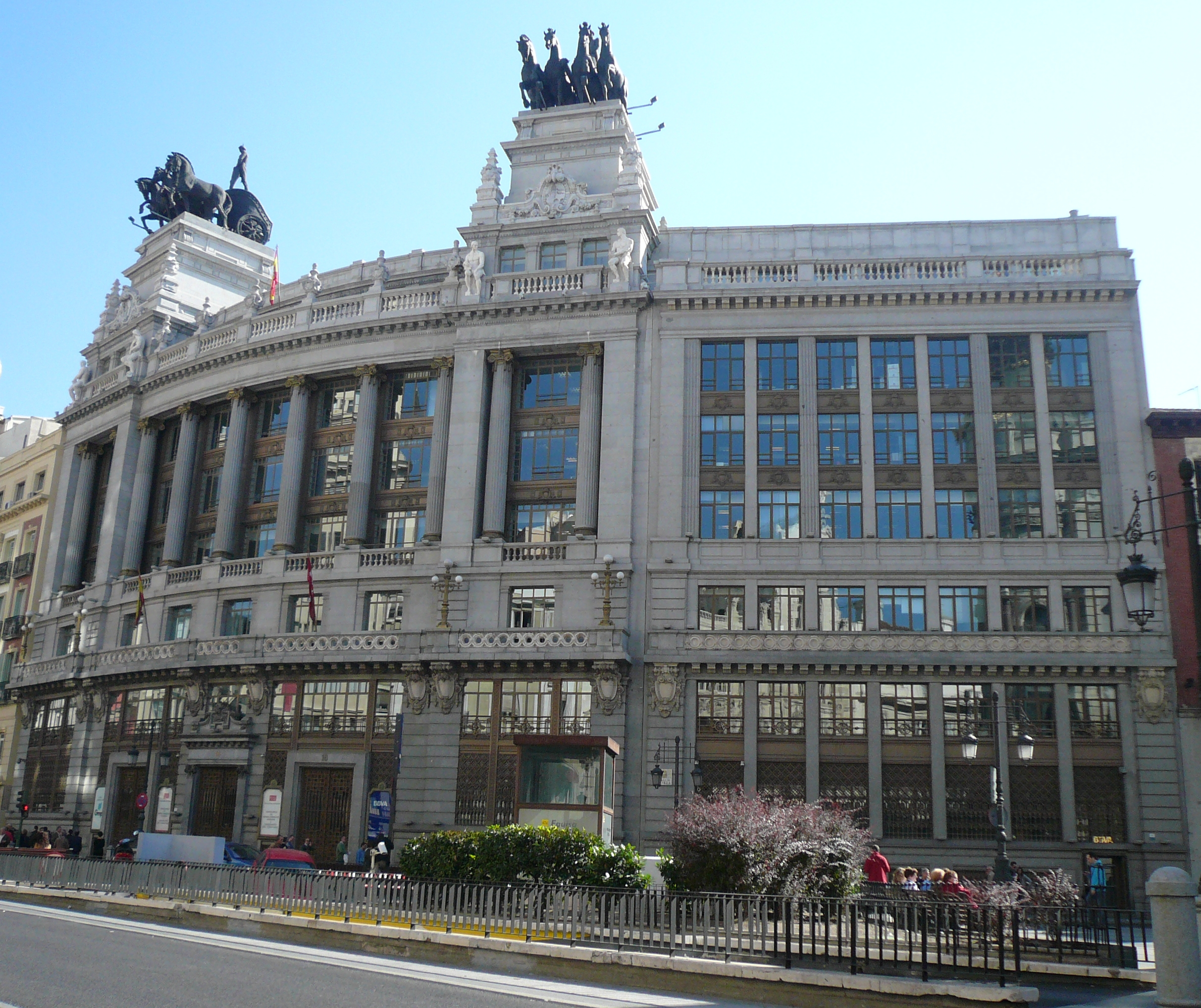
Banco de Bilbao, nº 16 C. Alcalá in Madrid.

- Alhóndiga, Bilbao, 1909
- "Casa Cuna", 1914
- Municipal Center of Disinfections, 1916
- "Casa Lezama-Leguizamon", Bilbao, 1921
- "Banco de Bilbao", nº 16 of calle de Alcalá in Madrid, 1923
- Blueprint of the junction between Bilbao and its surrounding villages, 1923
- The entry plan to Bilbao from Begoña, 1925

== See also ==
- Modernism in the architecture of Bilbao
- http://www.alhondigabilbao.com/
- http://www.euskomedia.org/aunamendi/12002
