= Zorrotzaurre =

Coordinates: 43.2712°N 2.9630°W

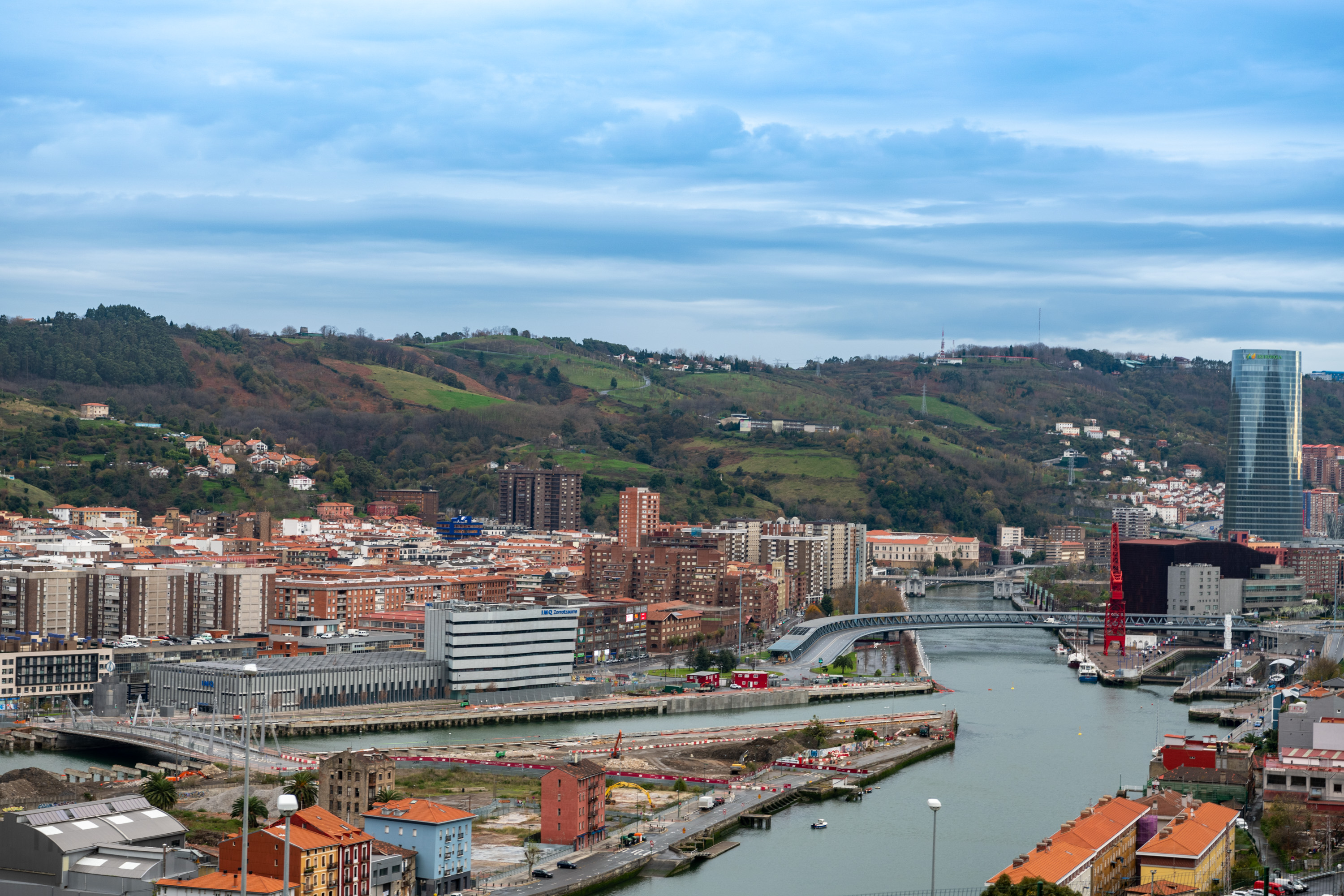
Zorrozaurre.

Zorrotzaurre (Spanish: Zorrozaurre) is an artificial island located within the Deusto district of Bilbao, Spain.

== History ==
It was first formed as a peninsula during the 1950s and the 1960s, when a canal was built to facilitate navigation in the estuary of Bilbao. The project was stopped in 1968 with 400 meters left to finish, forming the former peninsula. The area reached its heyday during this decade, with many industries moving there. However, during the industrial crisis of the 1980s that struck the city, many industries were forced to shut down or relocate, and only a handful of them survived to this day.

A plan was approved in 2012 to renew the neighborhood with residential and business uses, a Master Plan designed by British Iraqi architect Zaha Hadid. As part of the Plan, the canal was finished and officially opened on 8 October 2018, making the former peninsula become an island.

Two bridges link the resulting island to Deusto: Frank Gehry Bridge, inaugurated in 2015, and San Ignacio Bridge, finished in 2020.
