= Iberdrola Tower =

Office skyscraper in Bilbao, Spain

- Torre Iberdrola
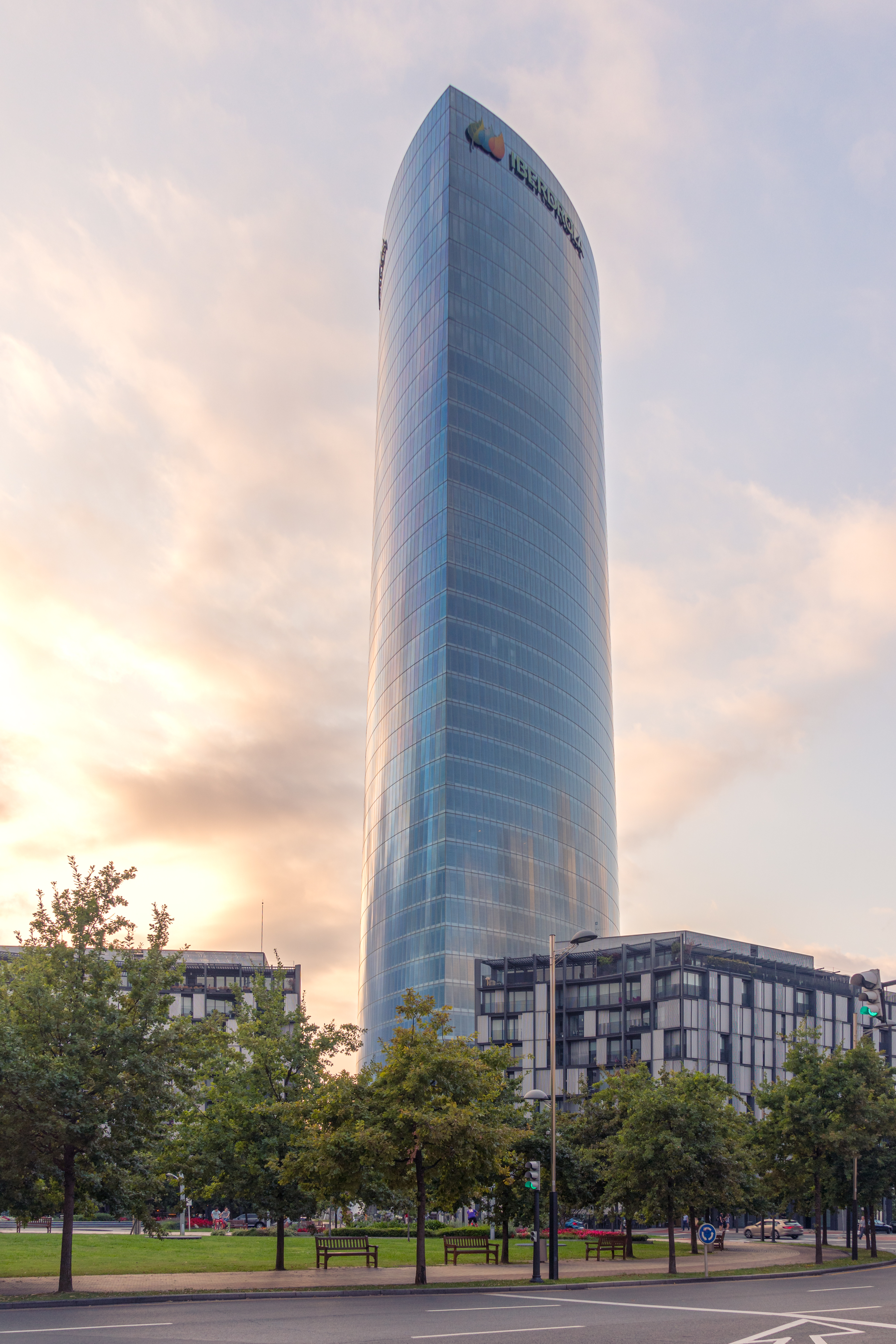
- The tower in 2019
- Interactive map of the Iberdrola Tower area

General information
- Status: Completed
- Location: Bilbao, Spain
- Coordinates: 43°16′03″N 2°56′19″W
- Construction started: 2007
- Completed: 2011
- Management: Apex Inmobiliaria S.A.

Height
- Roof: 165 m (541 ft)

Technical details
- Floor count: 41 (5 basement floors)
- Floor area: 50,000 m^{2} (538,000 sq ft)
- Lifts/elevators: 21

Design and construction
- Architect: César Pelli
- Main contractor: Promotora Vizcaina

The Iberdrola Tower (Basque: Iberdrola dorrea, Spanish: Torre Iberdrola) is an office skyscraper in Bilbao, Spain. Its construction started on 19 March 2009 and was officially inaugurated by King Juan Carlos I on 21 February 2012. The tower has a height of 165 metres (541 feet) tall and has 40 floors. The first eight floors of the tower were to hold a hotel by the Spanish hotel chain ABBA, but the project was eventually cancelled. The tower, built as Iberdrola's headquarters, is the tallest building in the Basque Country and the city of Bilbao, and the ninth tallest building in Spain.

The tower was built in Abandoibarra, a former industrial area located next to the Nervión river that began to be renewed in the early 1990s and where other emblematic projects such as the Guggenheim Museum Bilbao and the Euskalduna Conference Centre and Concert Hall have been built. There are two residential buildings designed by Carles Ferrater flanking the skyscraper. The entrance to the tower is located at the Euskadi Plaza.

== History of the building ==
=== Design and the Abandoibarra masterplan ===
In 1992 a public society, Bilbao Ria 2000, was created for the urban regeneration of the metropolitan Bilbao. The goal of that public company was to regenerate areas affected by the industrial crisis of the 1970s and converting former under used industrial lots into housing blocks, office buildings, green areas and other buildings of different usages.

One of those former industrial areas was Abandoibarra, located right next to the river, and between the La Salve bridge and the bankrupt Euskalduna shipbuilding company. In the early 1990s the regional authority of the province of Biscay chose César Pelli and its team to design a masterplan for the future development of the 348,5000 square metre area. One of the first proposals included two towers of 200 metres, but the final project that included the participation of the architect team Aguinaga y Asociados Arquitectos presented its final proposal with a single 150 metre office tower and several residential blocks of 10 floors.

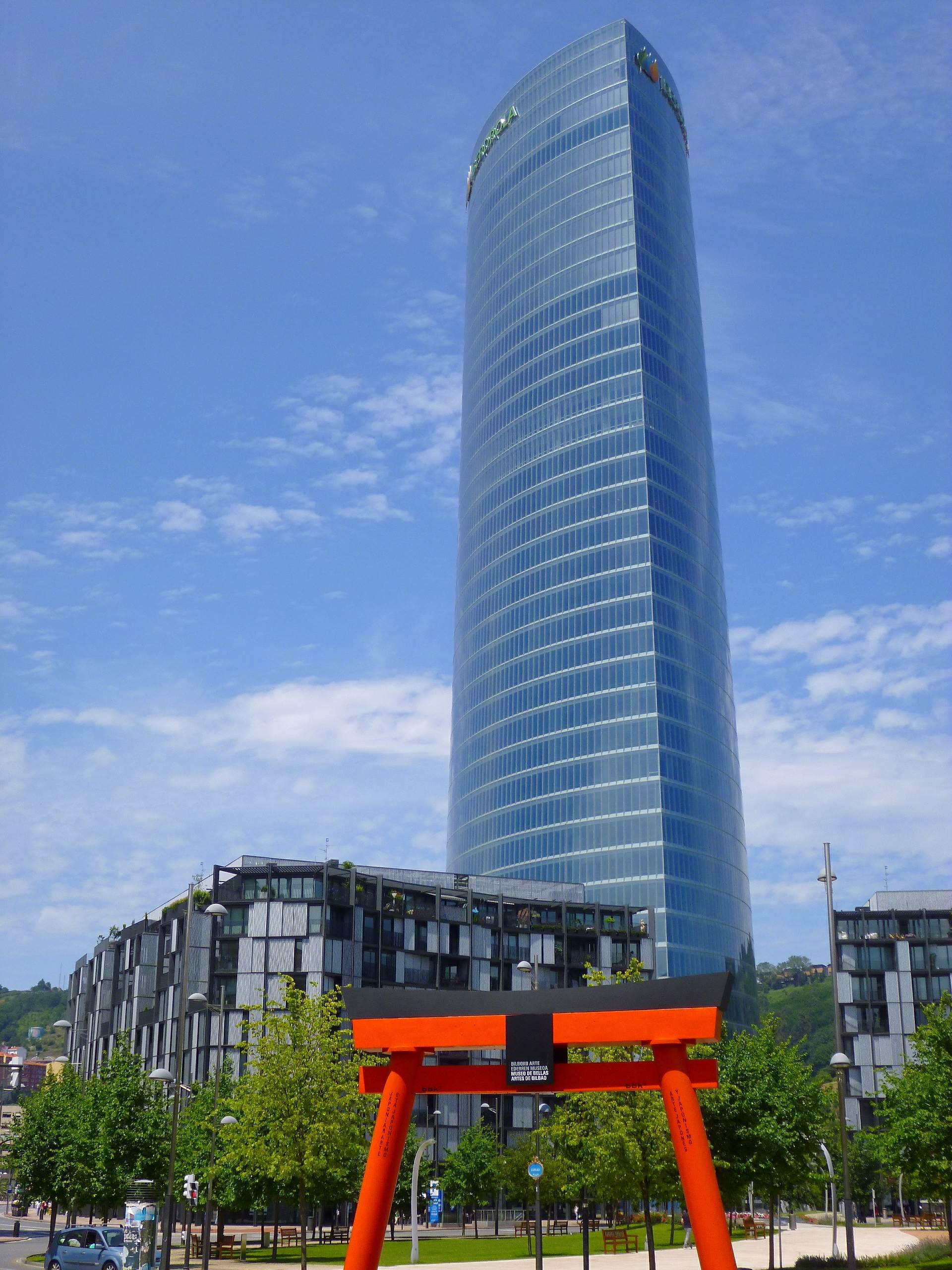
Front facade

=== Biscay's Diputation tower ===
In 1998 the regional authority of the province of Biscay (Bizkaiko Foru Aldundia or Diputacion Foral de Bizkaia) announced its intention to sell all of its buildings scattered throughout the city of Bilbao and moving all of its offices to the 150 metre tower. The lot, owned at that time by Renfe was sold for 79 million euros to the regional authority. The tower, originally expected to have 50,000 square metres of gross office space, was deemed as not enough for the Diputacion and an additional 10,000 square metres were included. The height increased from 150 metres to 160 to fit the new requirements by the Diputacion.

In 2003, just after the provincial elections had taken place, Jose Luis Bilbao, the newly elected ruler of the authority of Biscay, decided to scrap the plans for the tower, complaining about the high cost of the building.

=== Iberdrola Tower ===
After months of speculation about possible tenants wanting to move to the tower, the city hall of Bilbao reached an agreement with Basque utilities company Iberdrola in July 2004. Iberdrola would occupy 10,000 square metres of the tower establishing its international headquarters at the top of the tower, renting the rest of the office space. The operation would be financed by the selling of its former headquarters in the Gardoki street and another building in Alameda Urquijo.

The tower has 165 metres and 40 stories (36 typical plus 4 mechanical floors) and 5 underground levels. The tower was expected to cost around 210 million euros and include 717 car park units.

=== Construction ===
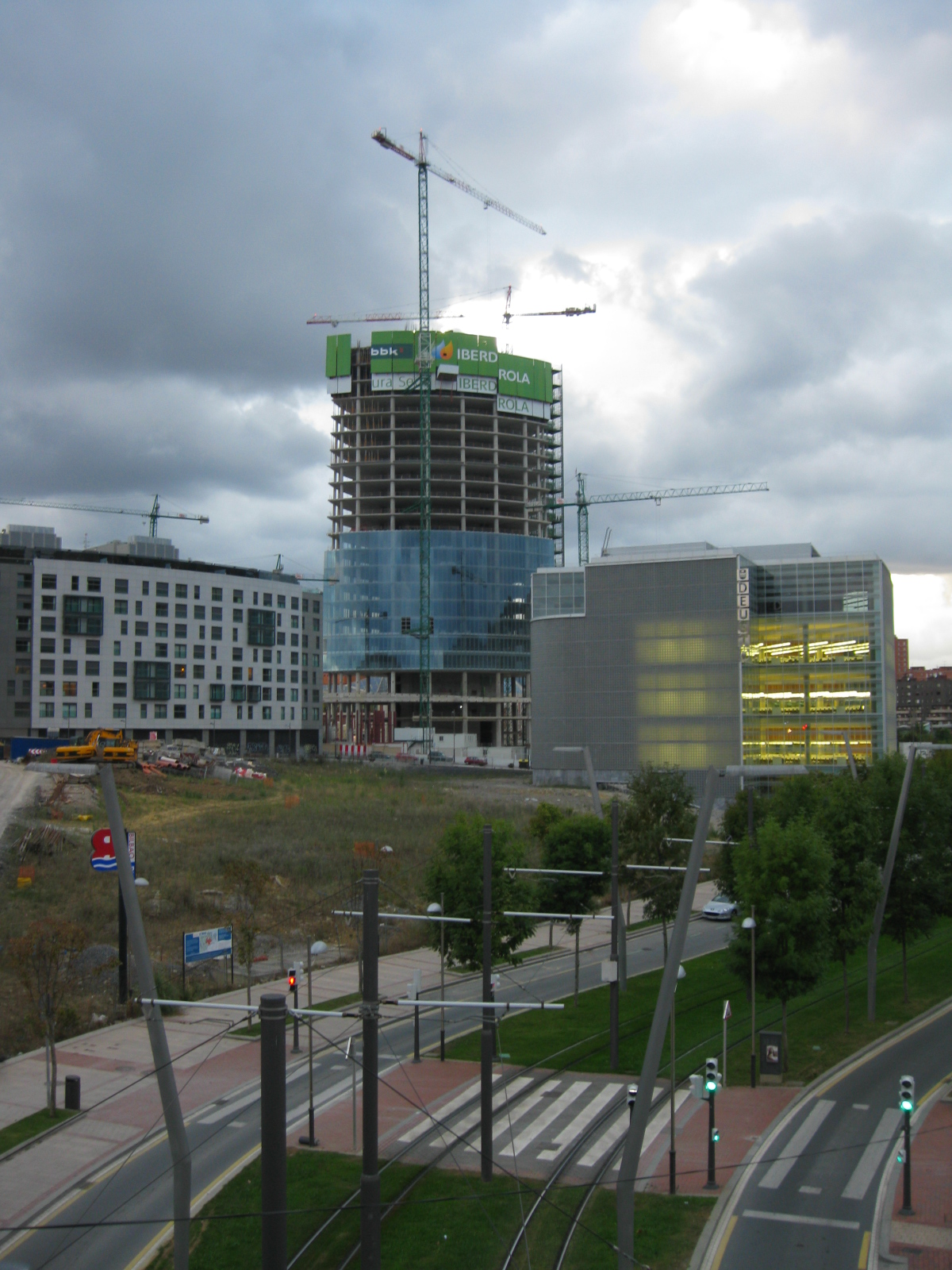
Construction status in mid September 2009.

After some months of site preparation, the first rock caisson ceremony was held on 19 March 2007. Then excavation for the five underground floors began. At the same time an underground car park is being built below the future Euskadi Plaza, two residential buildings by Carles Ferrater, the library of the University of Deusto and a residential building by Eugenio Aguinaga. The Iberdrola building in Alameda Urquijo has been sold to a developer and has renewed the building now called "Edificio Echevarria" (the first two floors of the tower are occupied by the shop FNAC). In the meantime, demolition of part of the headquarters in Gardoki began in late 2007. Part of the workers of Iberdrola were moved to another building in Larraskitu.

Excavation ended in April 2008, the first construction crane was installed on 15 May 2008, with a height of around 70 metres. Once the tower reaches its full height in 2010 the cranes will reach a height of 205 metres, the highest ever achieved by any structure in the Basque Country.

=== Companies involved ===
The following companies were involved with the construction of the Iberdrola Tower:

- Architect: César Pelli
- Developer: Promotora Vizcaina
- Real-state agents: Richard Ellis España, Apex Inmobiliaria
- Structural engineering: Idom
- Execution direction: Euroconsult Norte
- Foundation companies: Terrabauer, Cimentaciones Abando
- Curtain Wall Facade: Félix Constructions
- Elevator supplier: Schindler Group
