= Georges Récipon =

French painter and sculptor

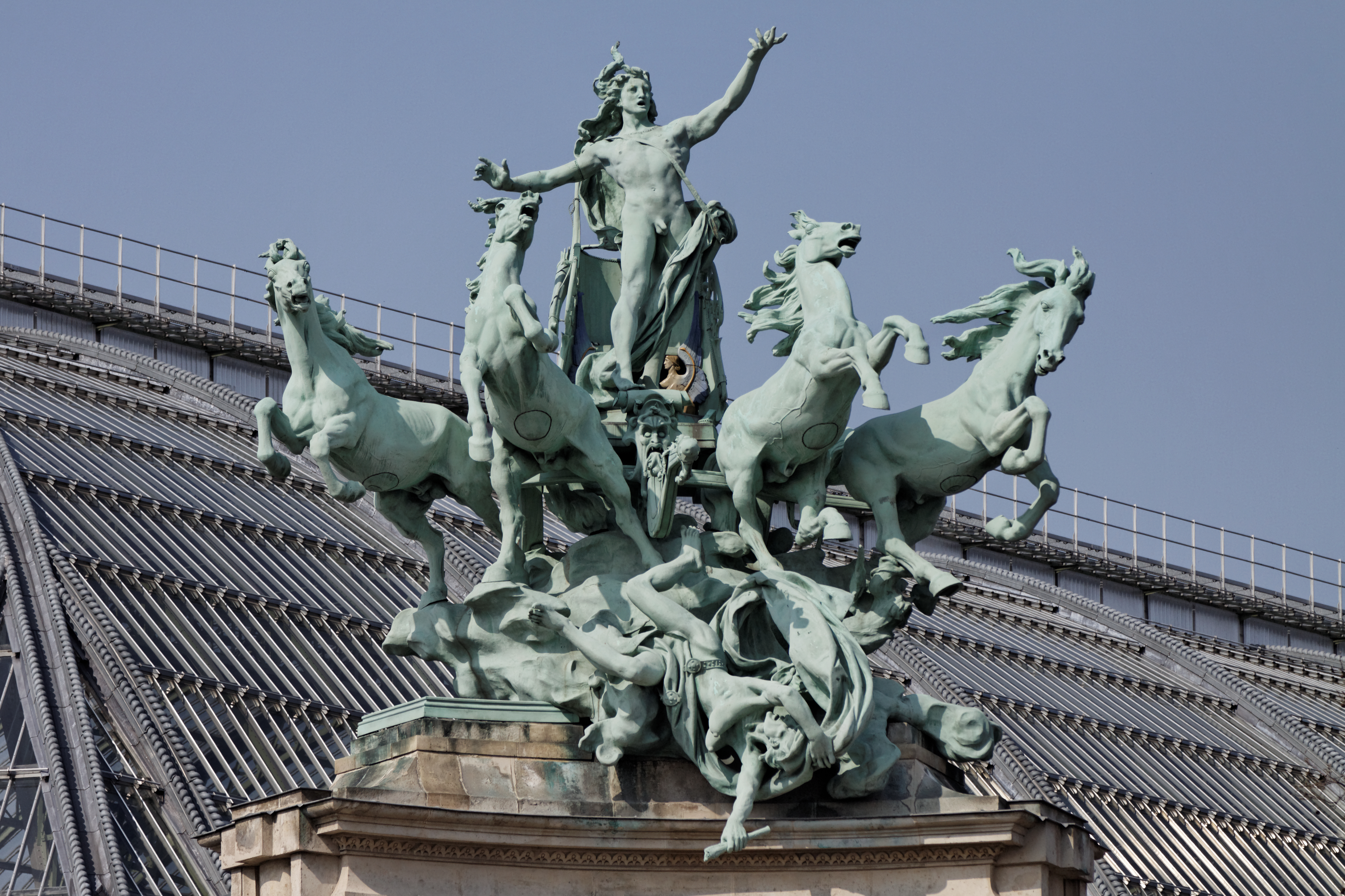
One of two quadrigas, Grand Palais, Paris, circa 1900

Georges Récipon (17 January 1860 – 2 May 1920) was a French painter and sculptor, whose major works are probably his sculptures at the Grand Palais in Paris, consisting of two monumental and exuberant quadrigas on the building's roof. He was the son of the Odiot goldsmith/silversmith Paul Edmond Récipon (1832–1898).

Other work includes:

- Equestrian statue of General Lariboisiere, Fougères, France
- Nymphs of the Neva and Nymphs of the Seine groups at the Pont Alexandre III, Paris
