= Quadriga =

Chariot drawn by four horses

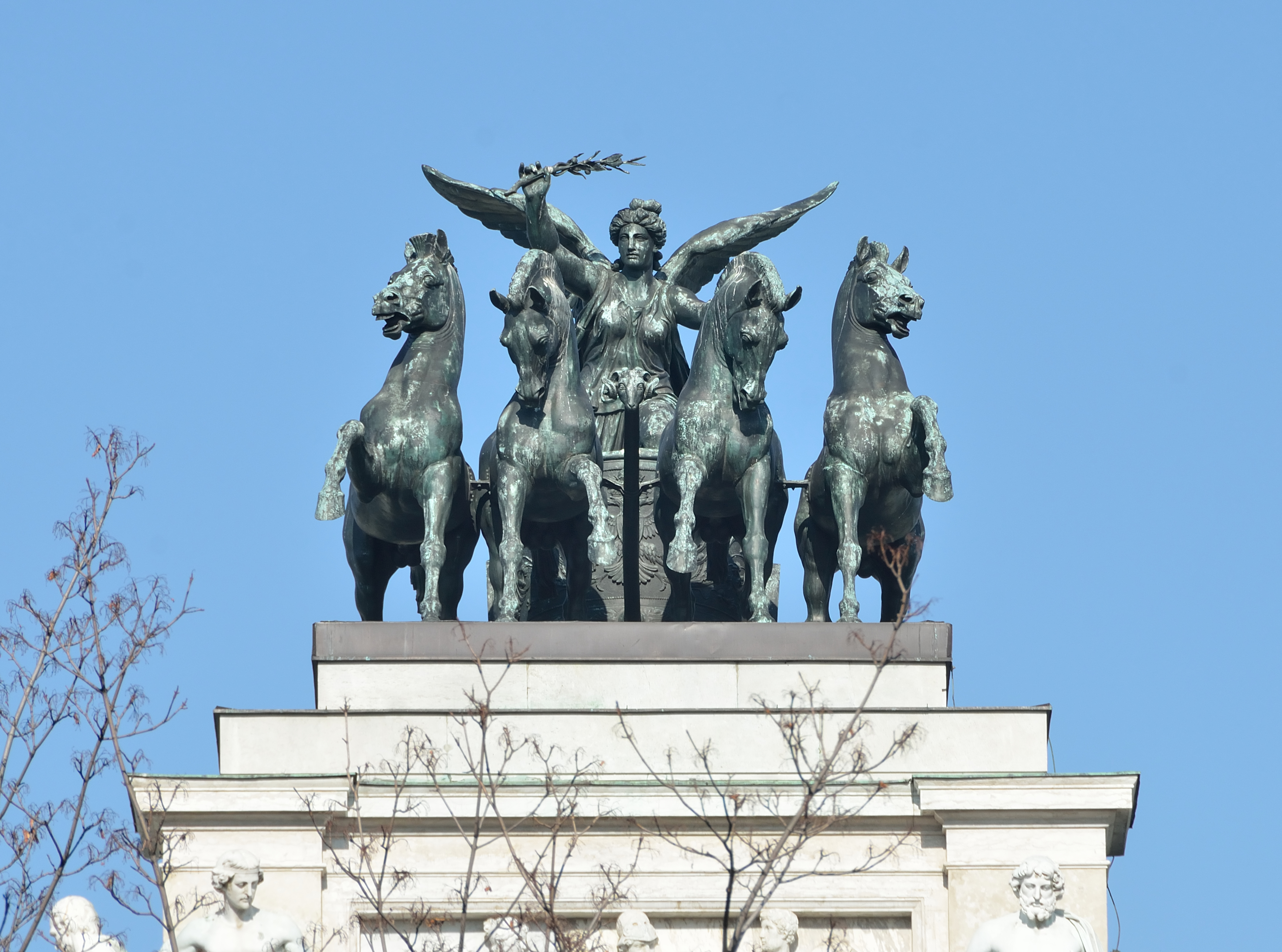
Quadriga on the Austrian Parliament Building, Vienna

A quadriga is a car or chariot drawn by four horses abreast and favoured for chariot racing in classical antiquity and the Roman Empire. The word derives from the Latin quadrigae, a contraction of quadriiugae, from quadri-: four, and iugum: yoke. In Latin the word quadrigae is almost always used in the plural and usually refers to the team of four horses rather than the chariot they pull. In Greek, a four-horse chariot was known as τέθριππον (téthrippon).

The four-horse abreast arrangement in a quadriga is distinct from the more common four-in-hand array of two horses in the front plus two horses behind those.

Quadrigae were raced in the ancient Olympic Games and other contests. They are represented in profile pulling the chariot of gods and heroes on Greek vases and in bas-relief. During the festival of the Halieia, the ancient Rhodians would sacrifice a quadriga-chariot by throwing it into the sea. The quadriga was adopted in ancient Roman chariot racing.

Quadrigas were emblems of triumph. Victory or Fame are often depicted as the triumphant woman driving it. In classical mythology, the quadriga is the chariot of the gods. The god of the Sun Helios, often identified with Apollo, the god of light, was depicted driving his quadriga across the heavens, delivering daylight and dispersing the night.

== Classical sculpture ==
Modern sculptural quadrigas are based on the four bronze Horses of Saint Mark or the "Triumphal Quadriga", a set of equine Roman or Greek sculptures. Their age is disputed. Originally erected in the Hippodrome of Constantinople, possibly on a triumphal arch, they are now in St Mark's Basilica in Venice.

Venetian Crusaders looted these sculptures in the Fourth Crusade, which dates them to at least 1204, and placed them on the terrace of St Mark's Basilica. In 1797, Napoleon carried the quadriga off to Paris. They were returned after Napoleon's fall. Due to the effects of atmospheric pollution, the original quadriga was retired to a museum and replaced with a replica in the 1980s.

Quadrigae also appear on the frieze of the Libyco-Punic Mausoleum of Dougga, which dates to the 2nd century BC.

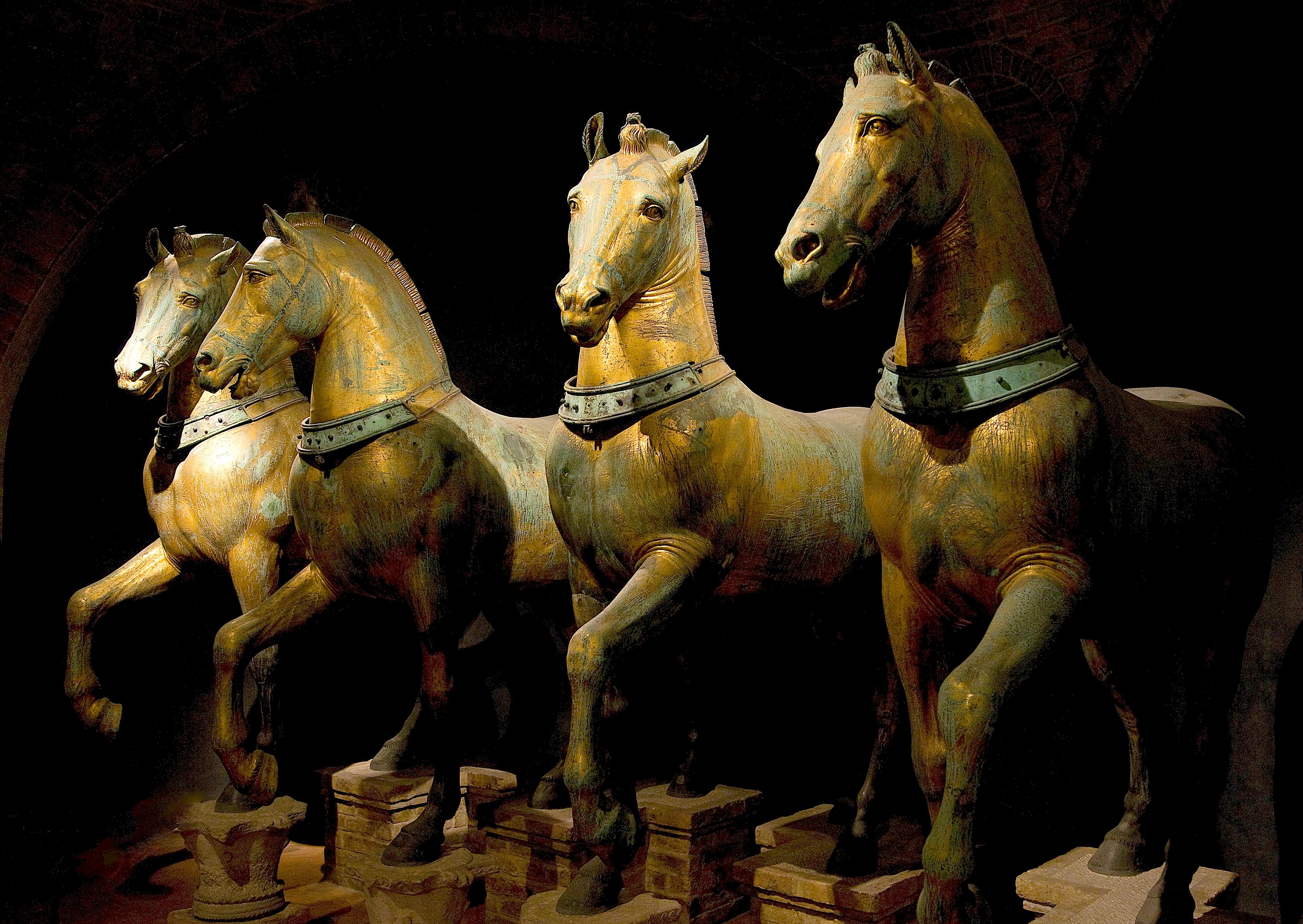
The original Horses of Saint Mark inside St Mark's Basilica, Venice

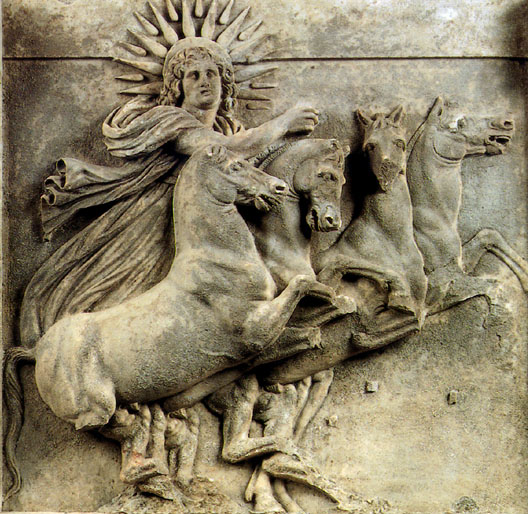
Helios in his chariot, early 4th century BC, Athena's temple, Ilion

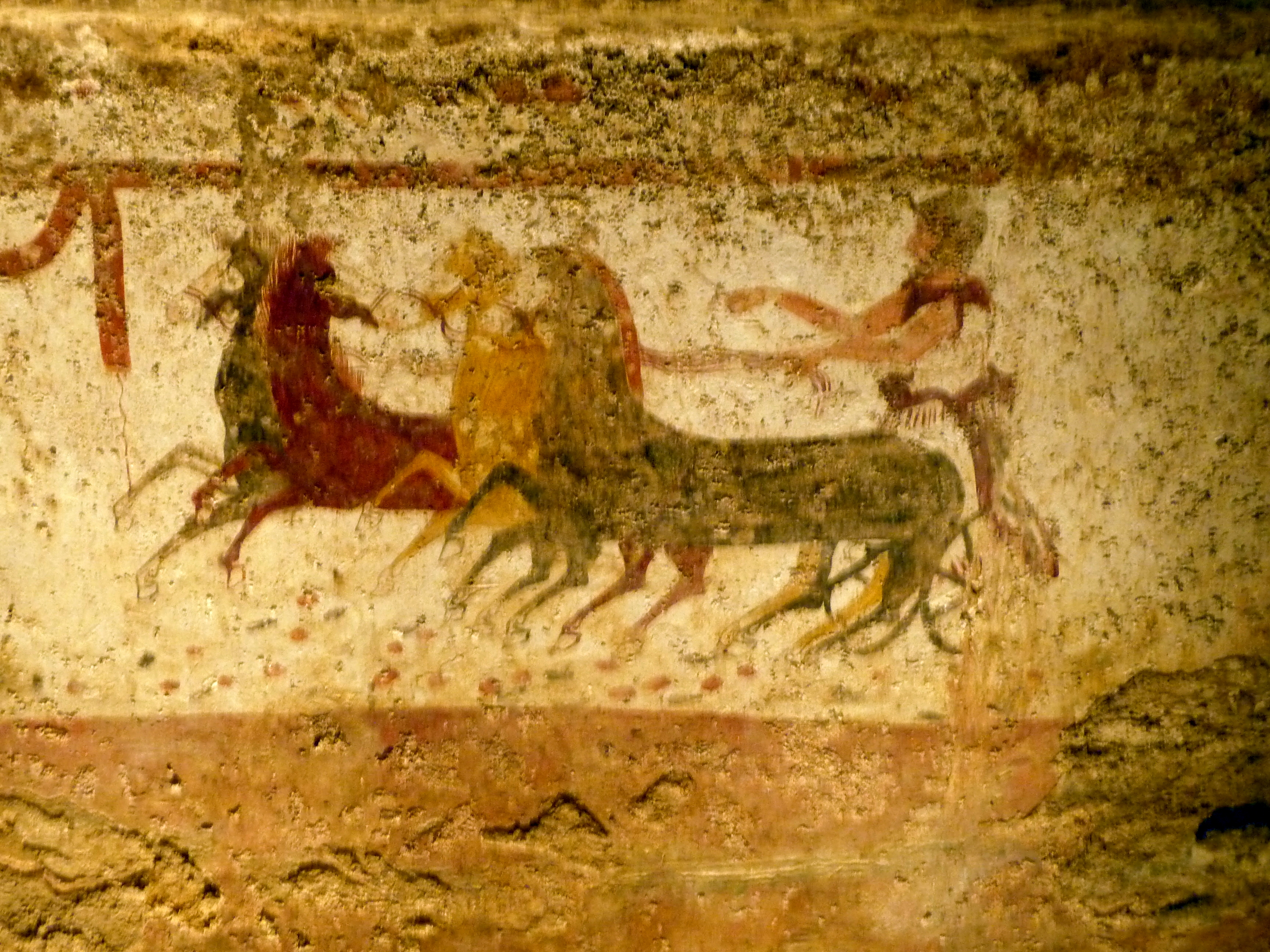
A Lucanian fresco from Paestum depicting a quadriga, 4th century BC

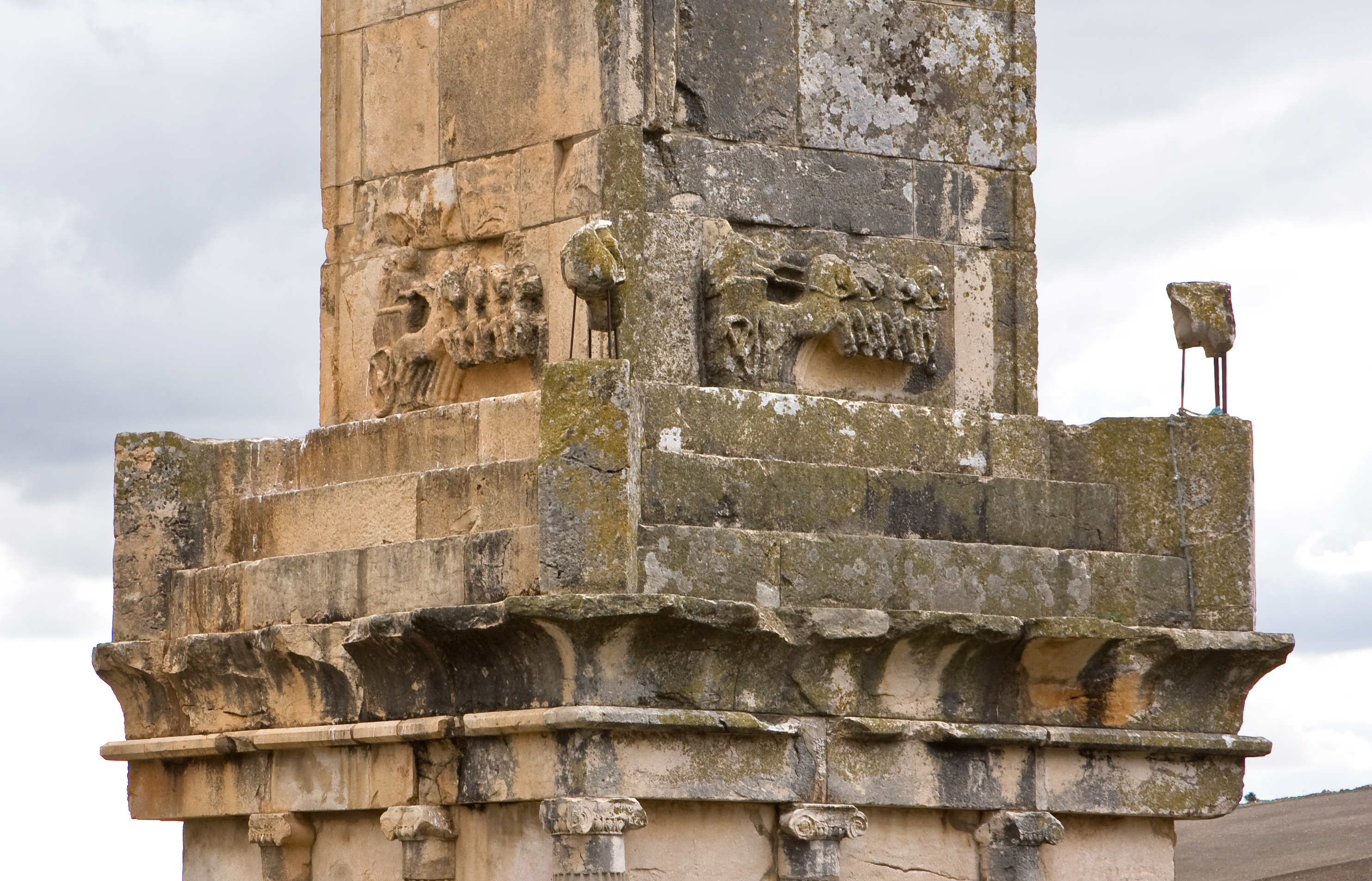
A frieze on the 2nd-century BC Libyco-Punic Mausoleum of Dougga

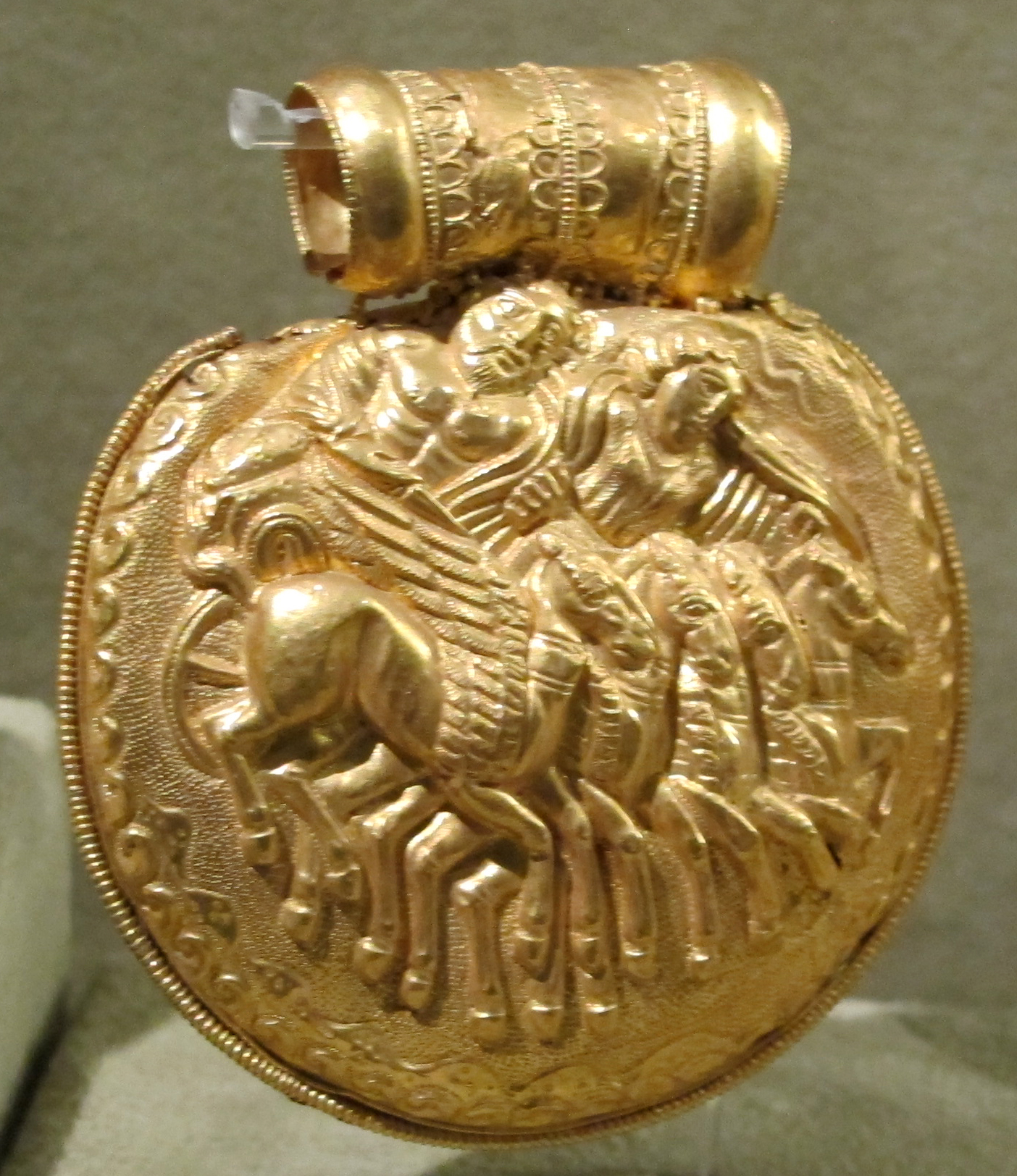
Jupiter and Minerva riding a quadriga drawn by pegasi on a 4th-century BC gold Etruscan bulla, Museo Gregoriano Etrusco

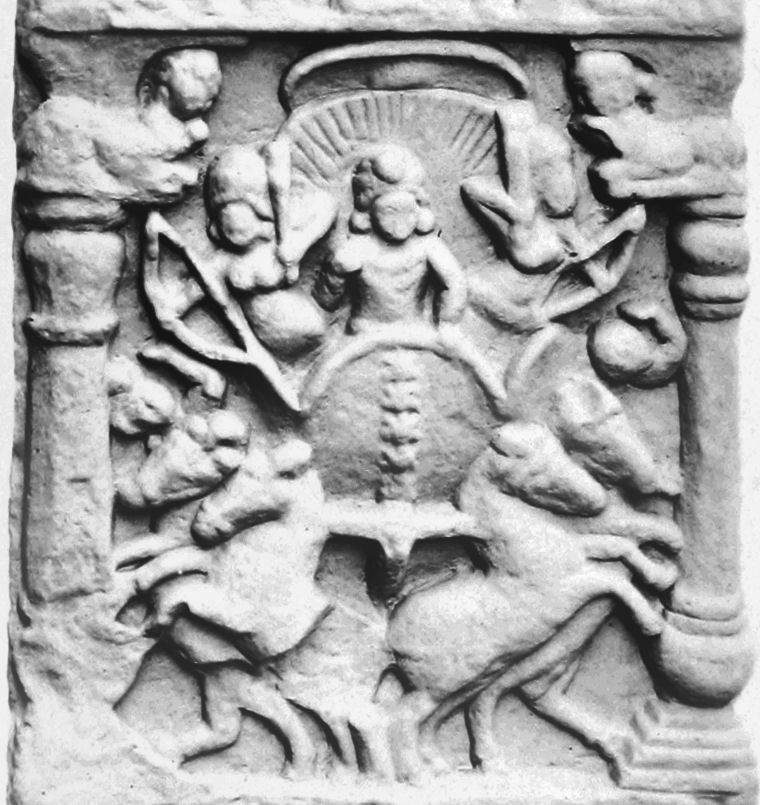
A relief of a quadriga of Sun god Surya at Bodh Gaya, India

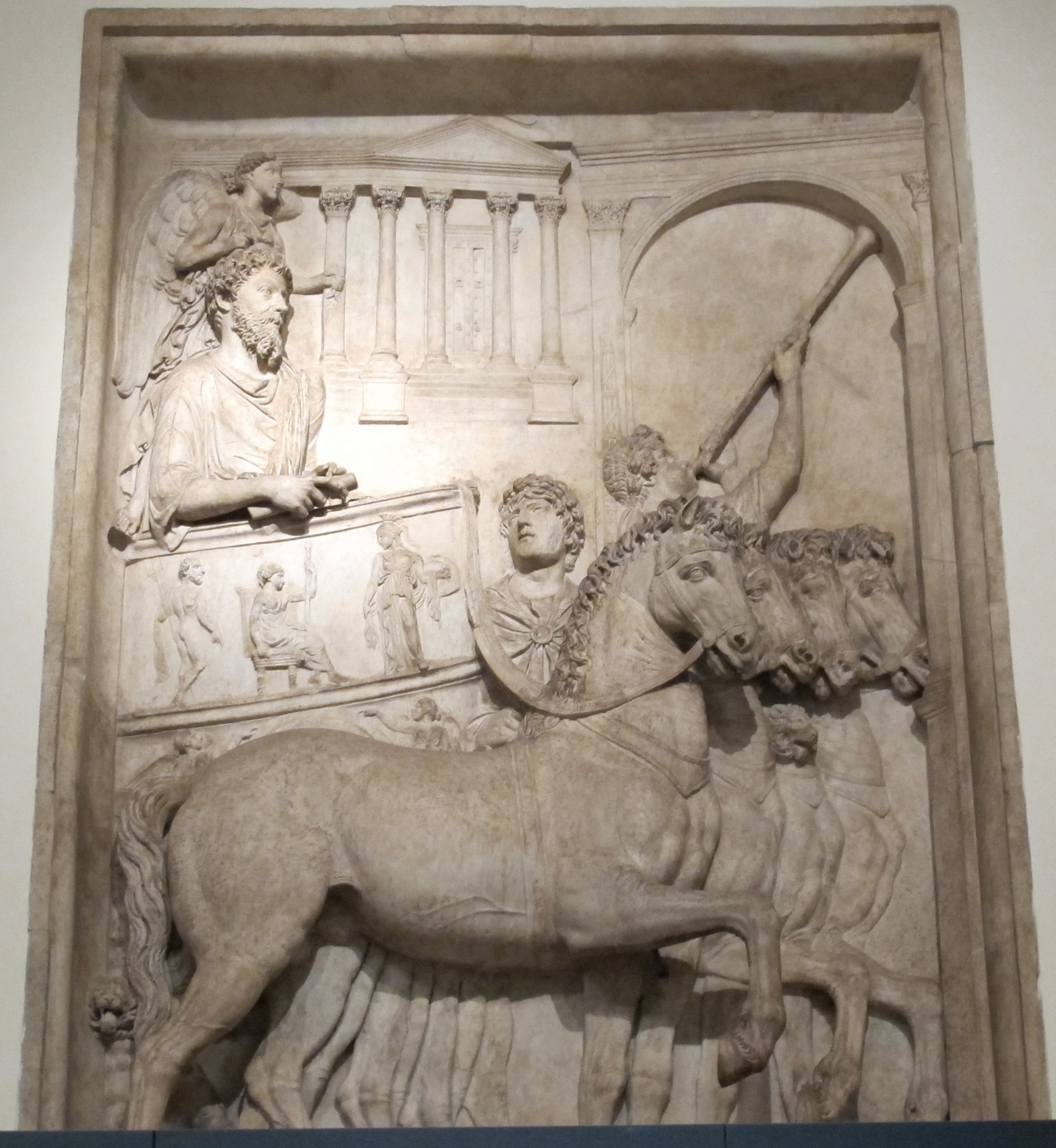
Marcus Aurelius celebrating his Roman triumph in 176 AD over the enemies of the Marcomannic Wars, from his now destroyed triumphal arch in Rome, Capitoline Museums, 176–180 AD

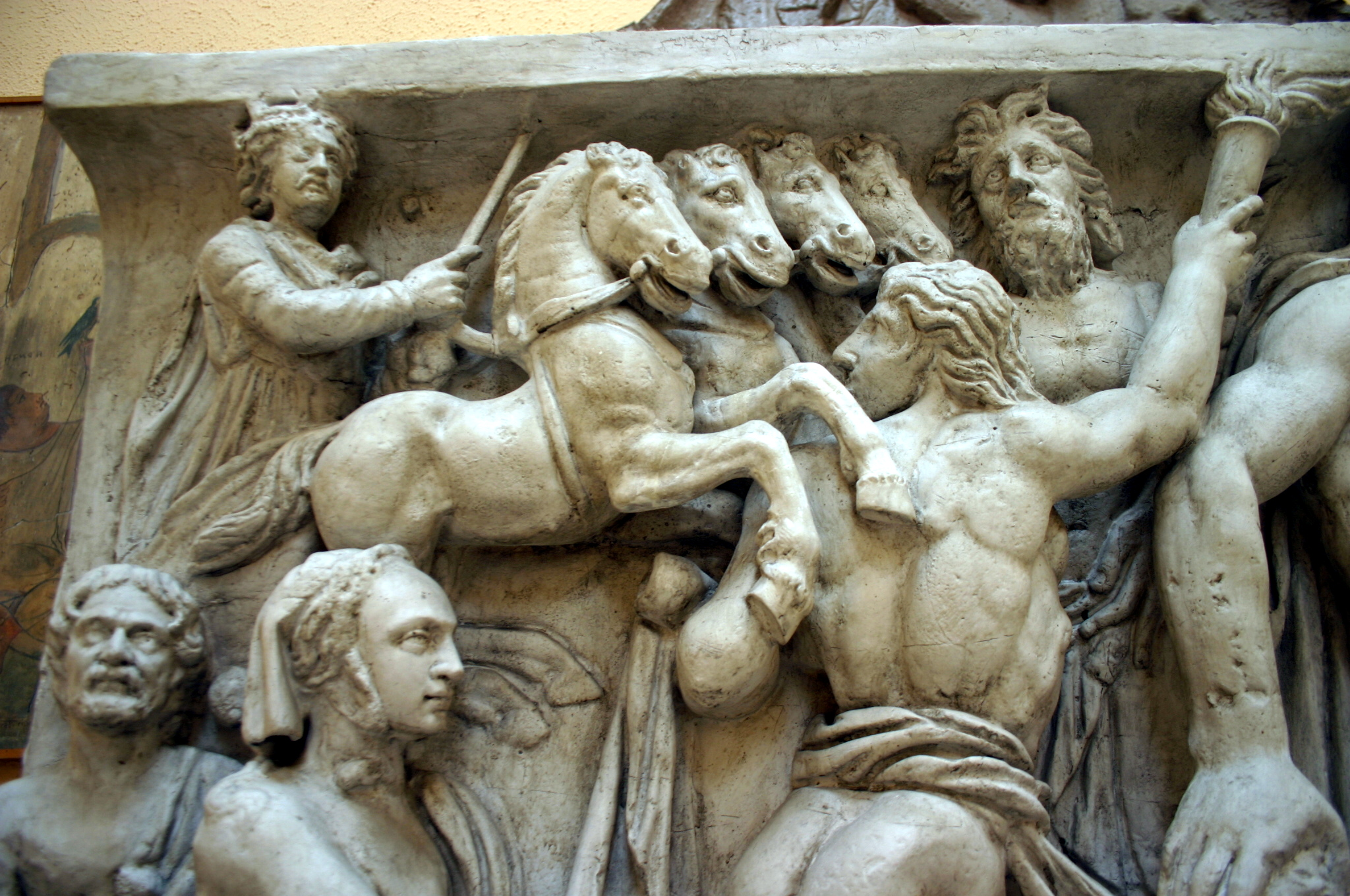
Apollo as the Sun god. Cast of the sarcofago matti (c. 220 AD), Museum of Roman Civilization

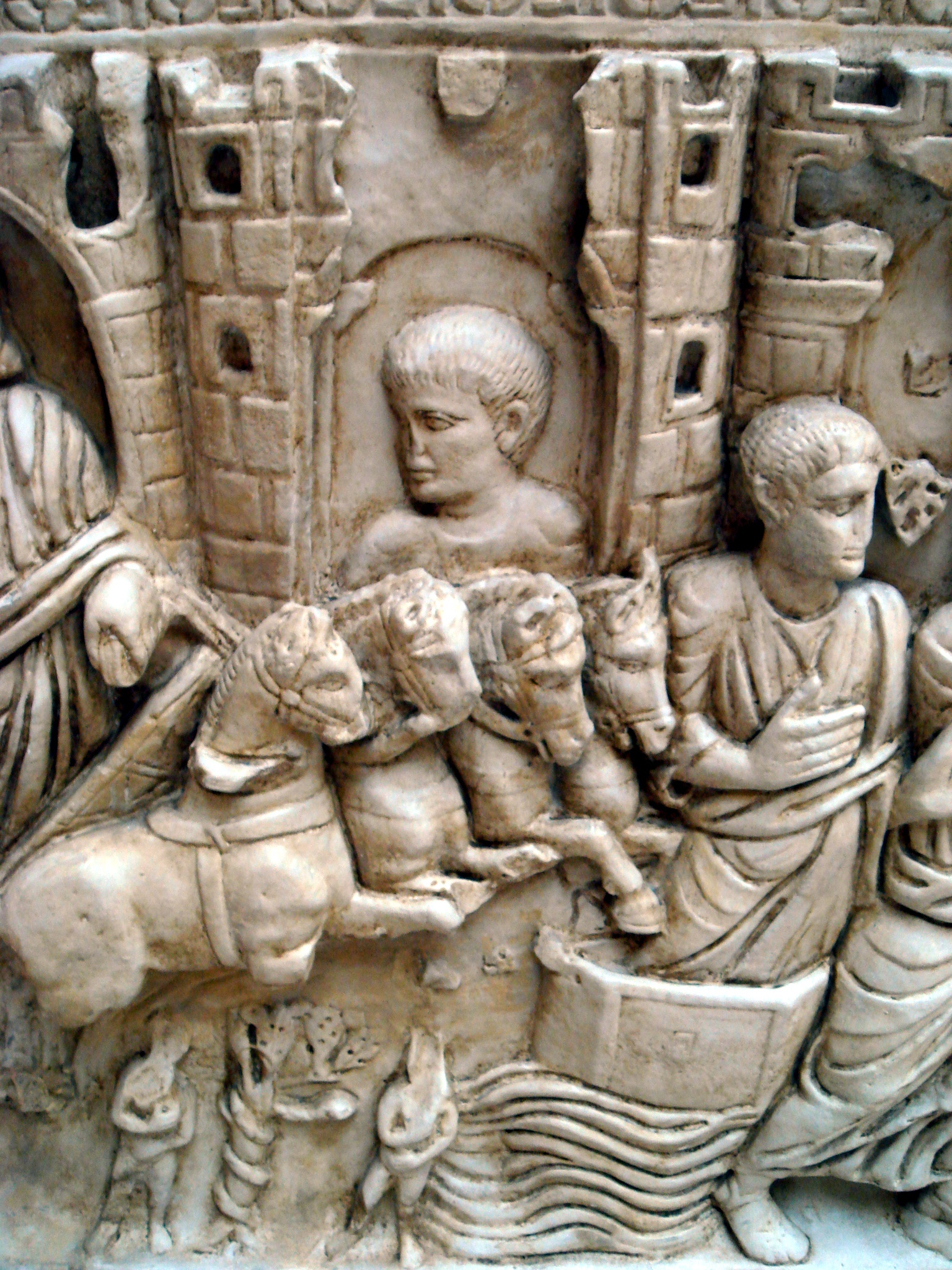
Detail from a plaster cast of the late 4th-century so-called Sarcophagus of Stilicho, Museum of Roman Civilization

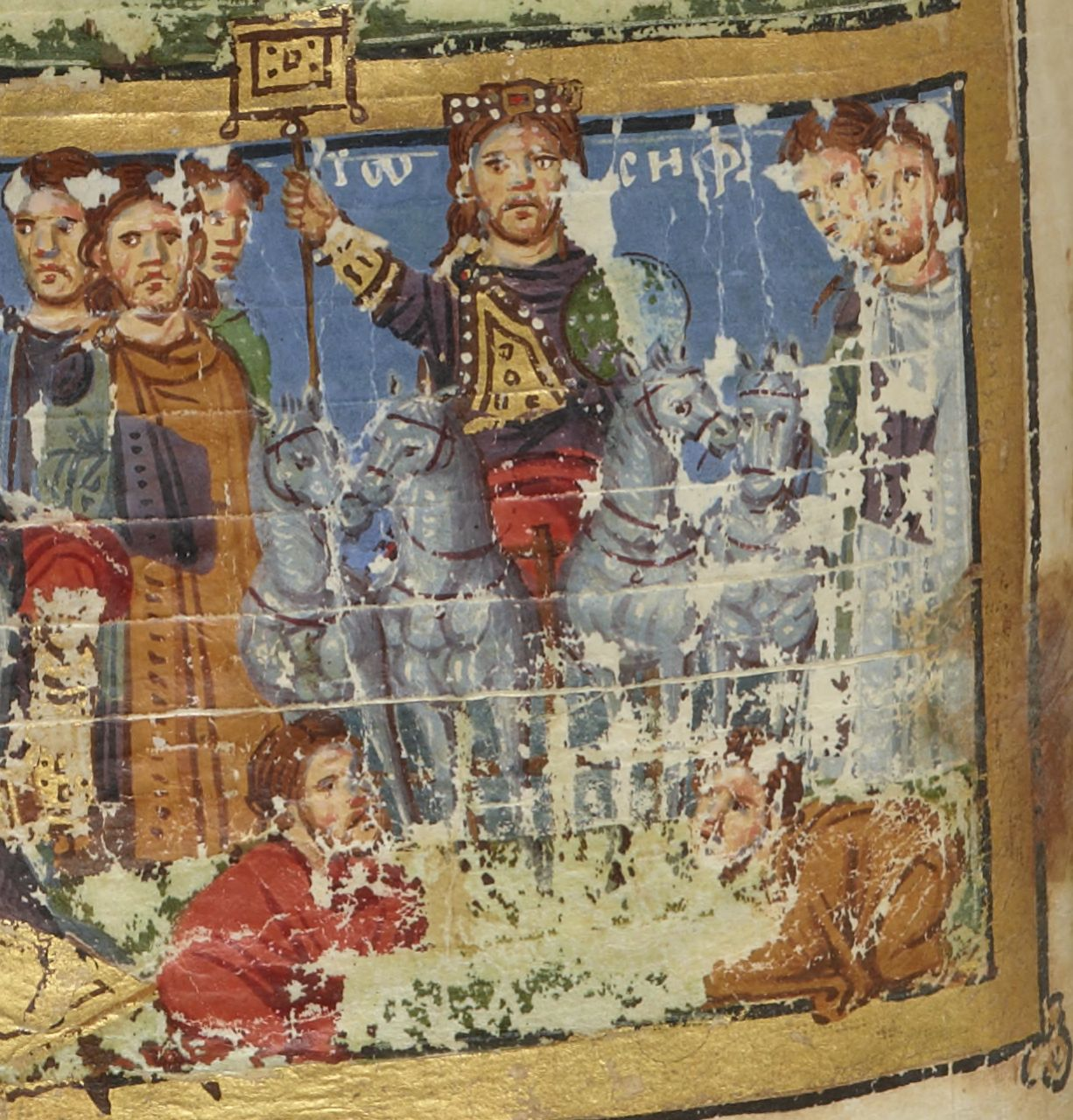
Genesis 41:42–43: "And Pharaoh … made him to ride in the second chariot which he had; and they cried before him, bow the knee: and he made him ruler over all the land of Egypt." Miniature from the Paris Gregory, a 9th-century Greek manuscript, Bibliothèque nationale de France

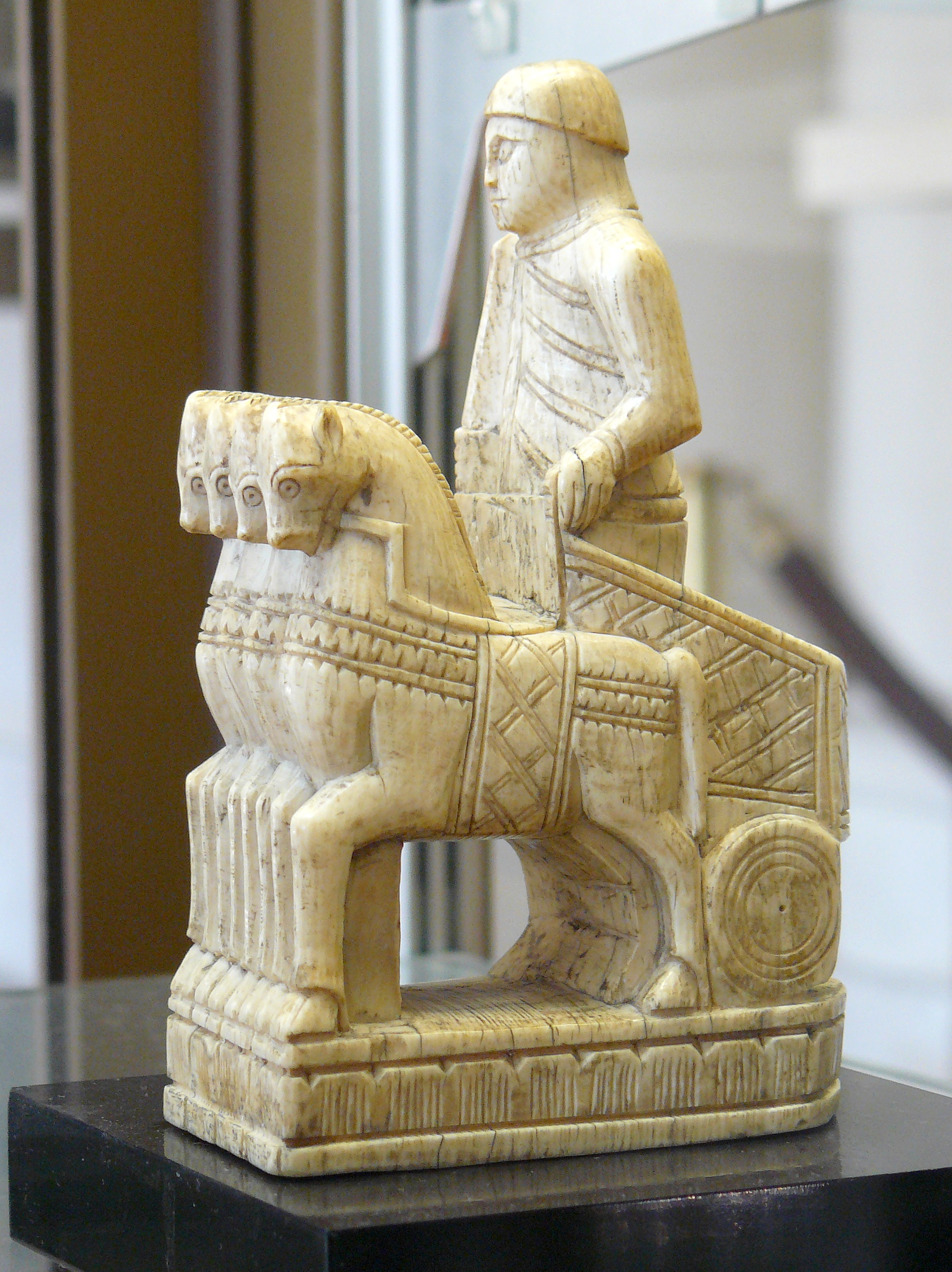
An 11th-century rook from Southern Italy in the form of Charlemagne in a quadriga, from the Charlemagne chessmen, Cabinet des Médailles

== Variations ==
Though quadrigae were usually drawn by horses, occasionally, other animals or mythological creatures were employed in spectacles and in art. Elephants were sometimes used to draw quadrigae in the Roman imperial period, and more frequently elephant quadrigae were depicted on coins and other official images. In art and sculpture, quadrigae ridden in by the gods were appropriate to their characters; Neptune's quadriga was drawn, for example, by hippocampi (mythological sea-horses).

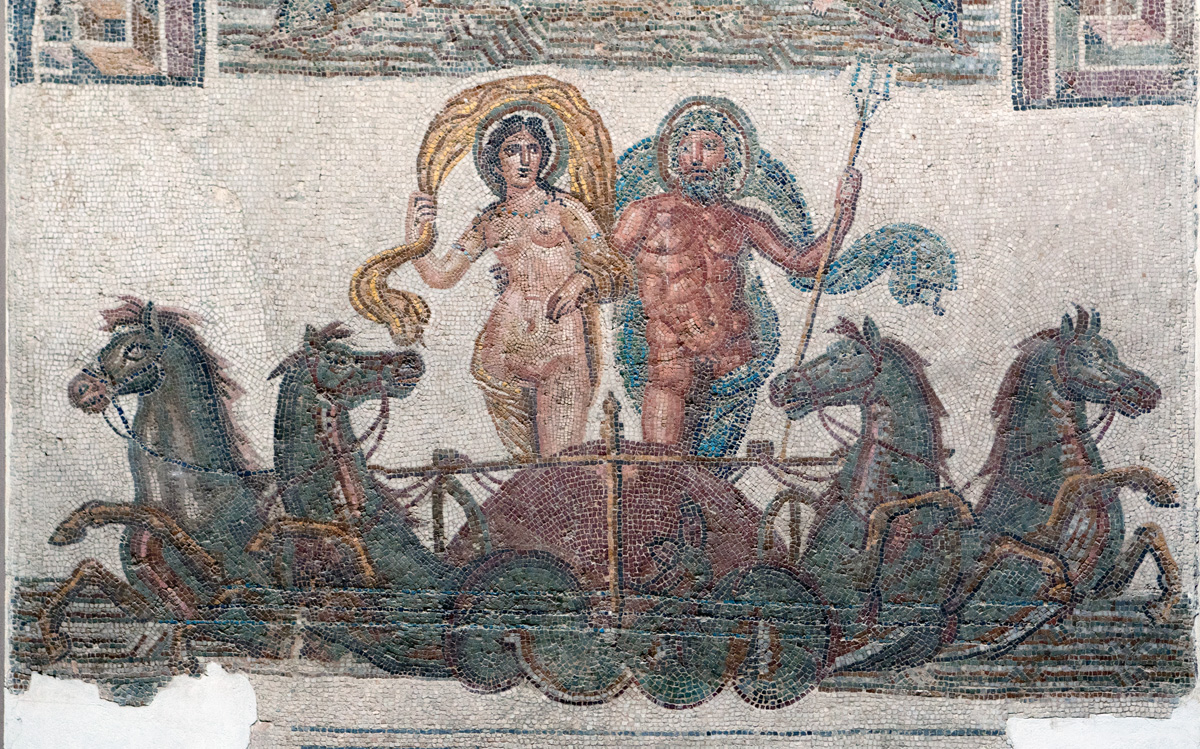
The triumph of Neptune and Venus in a quadriga drawn by hippocampi in a mosaic from Utica in Africa, Bardo National Museum

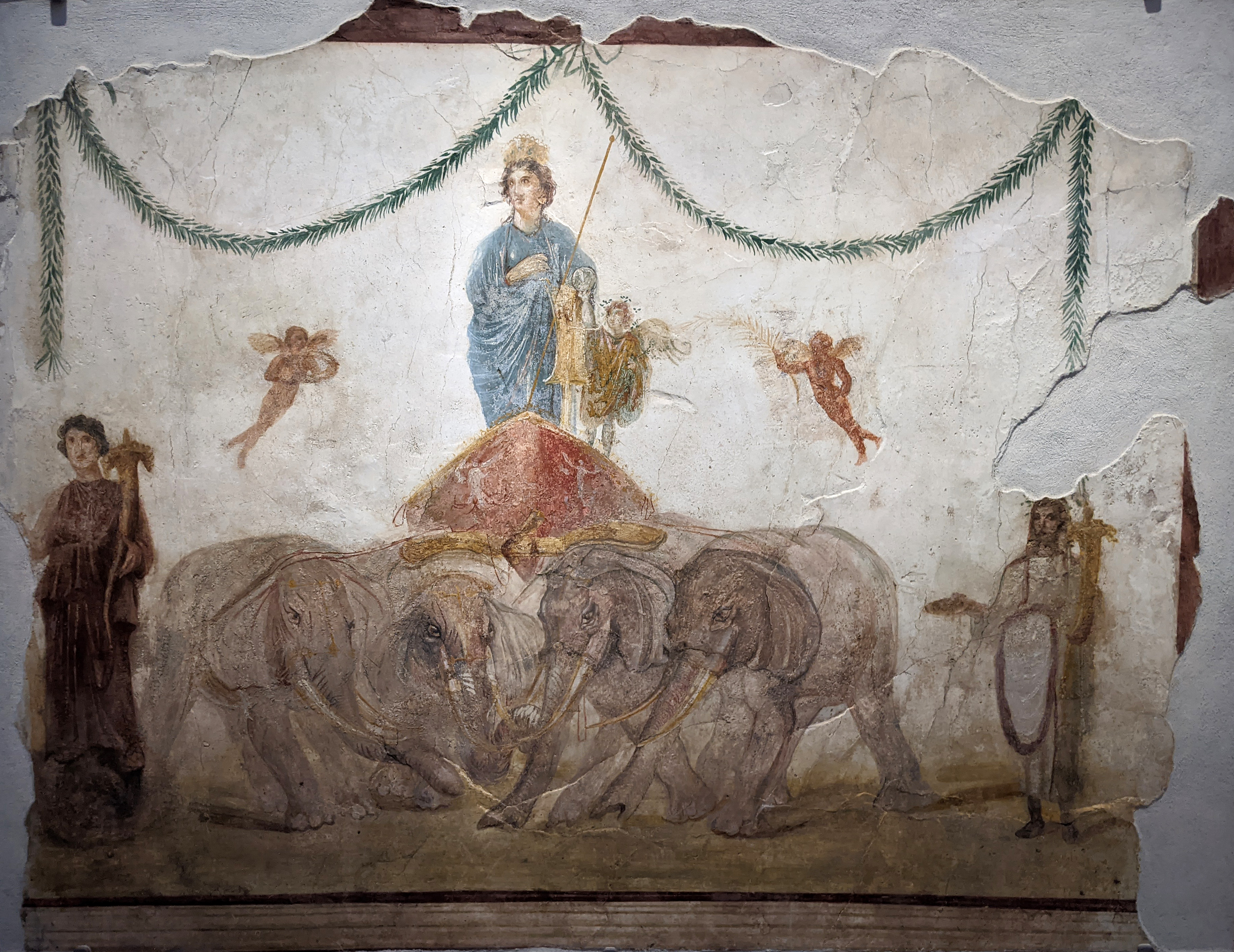
Venus riding in a quadriga drawn by elephants, 1st-century AD fresco from Pompeii

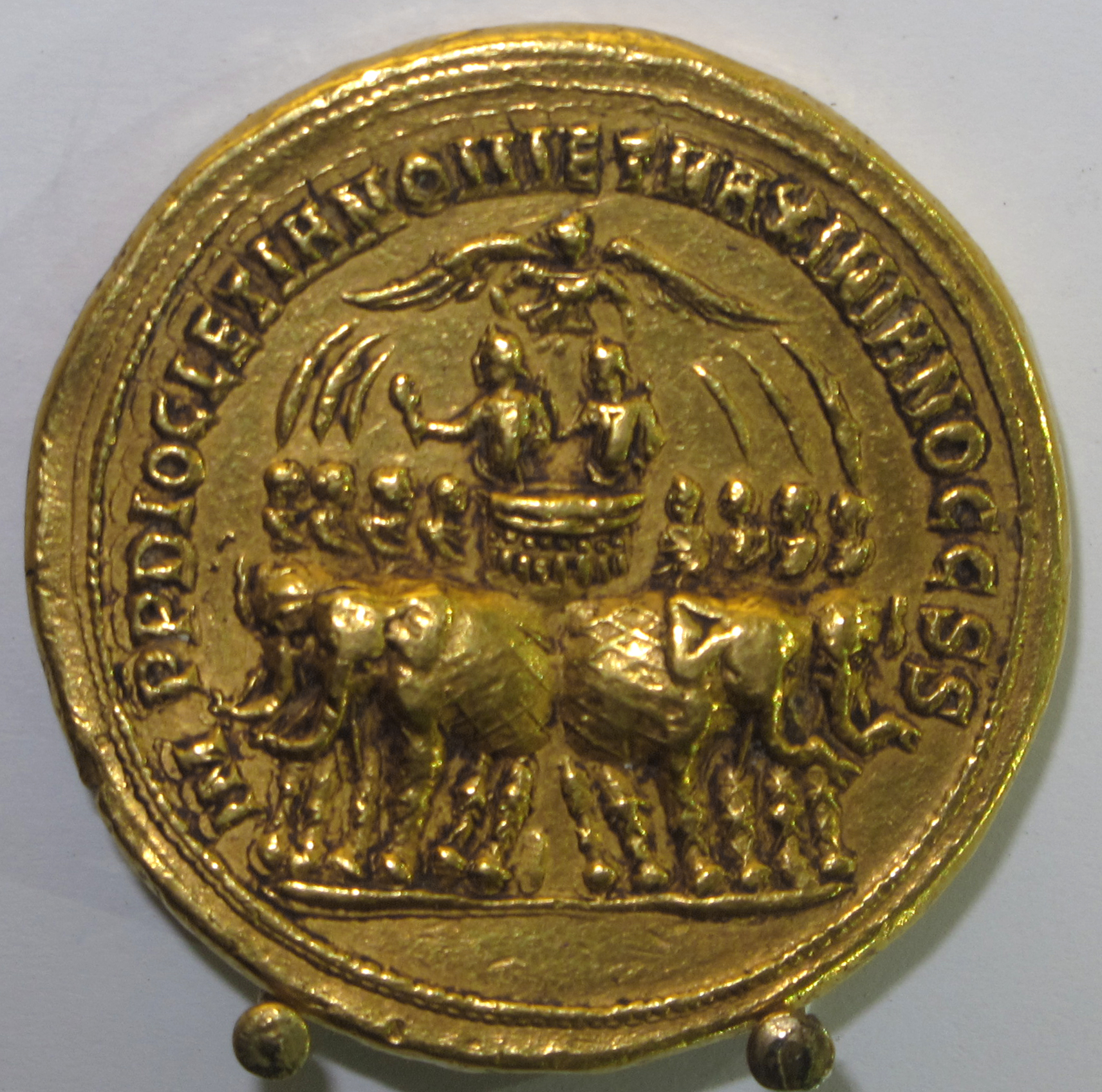
Medallion of the co-augusti Diocletian and Maximian (r. 285–305) riding in a quadriga drawn by elephants and crowned by Victory

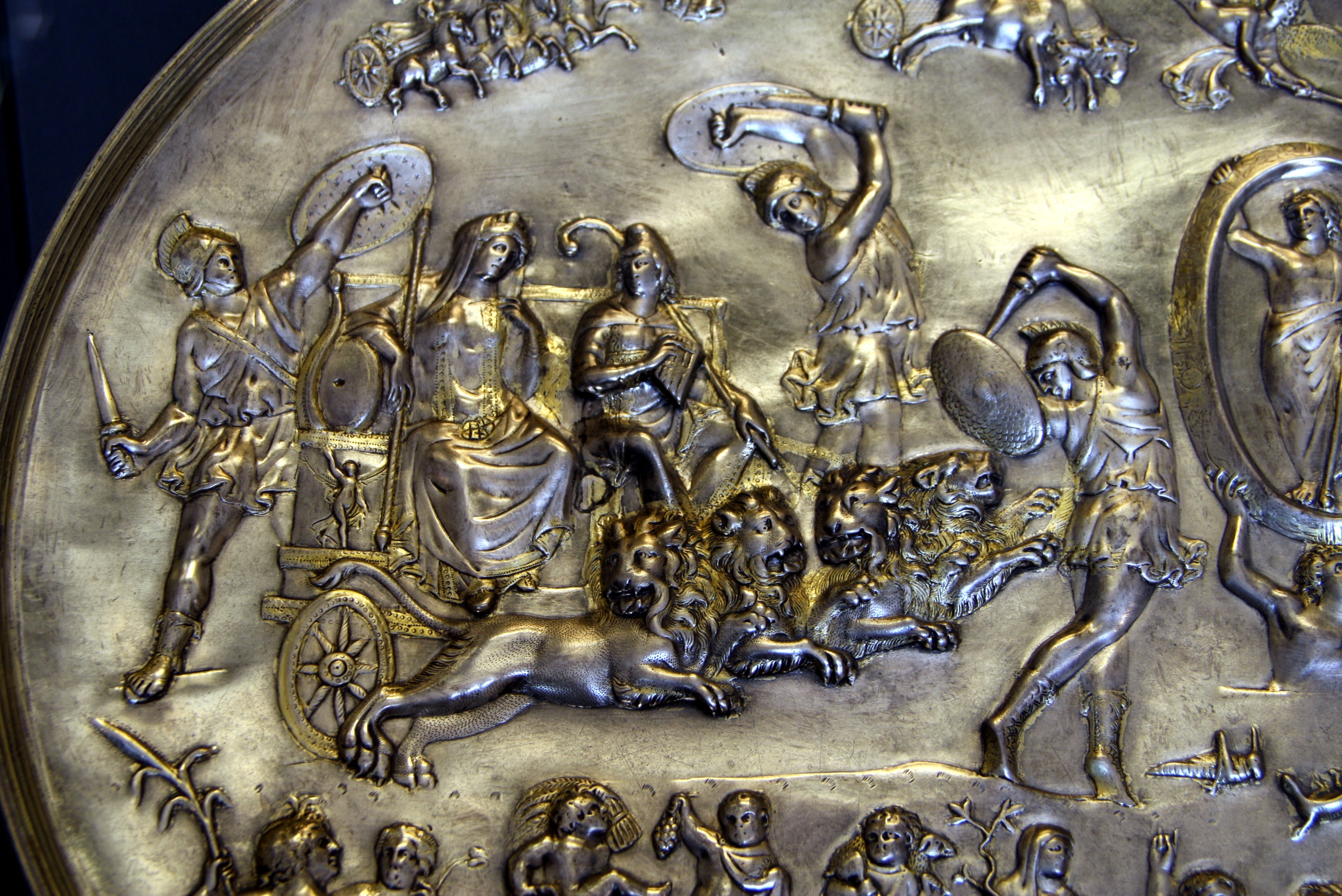
Cybele and Attis riding on a quadriga drawn by lions on the 4th-century Parabiago plate, Archaeological Museum of Milan

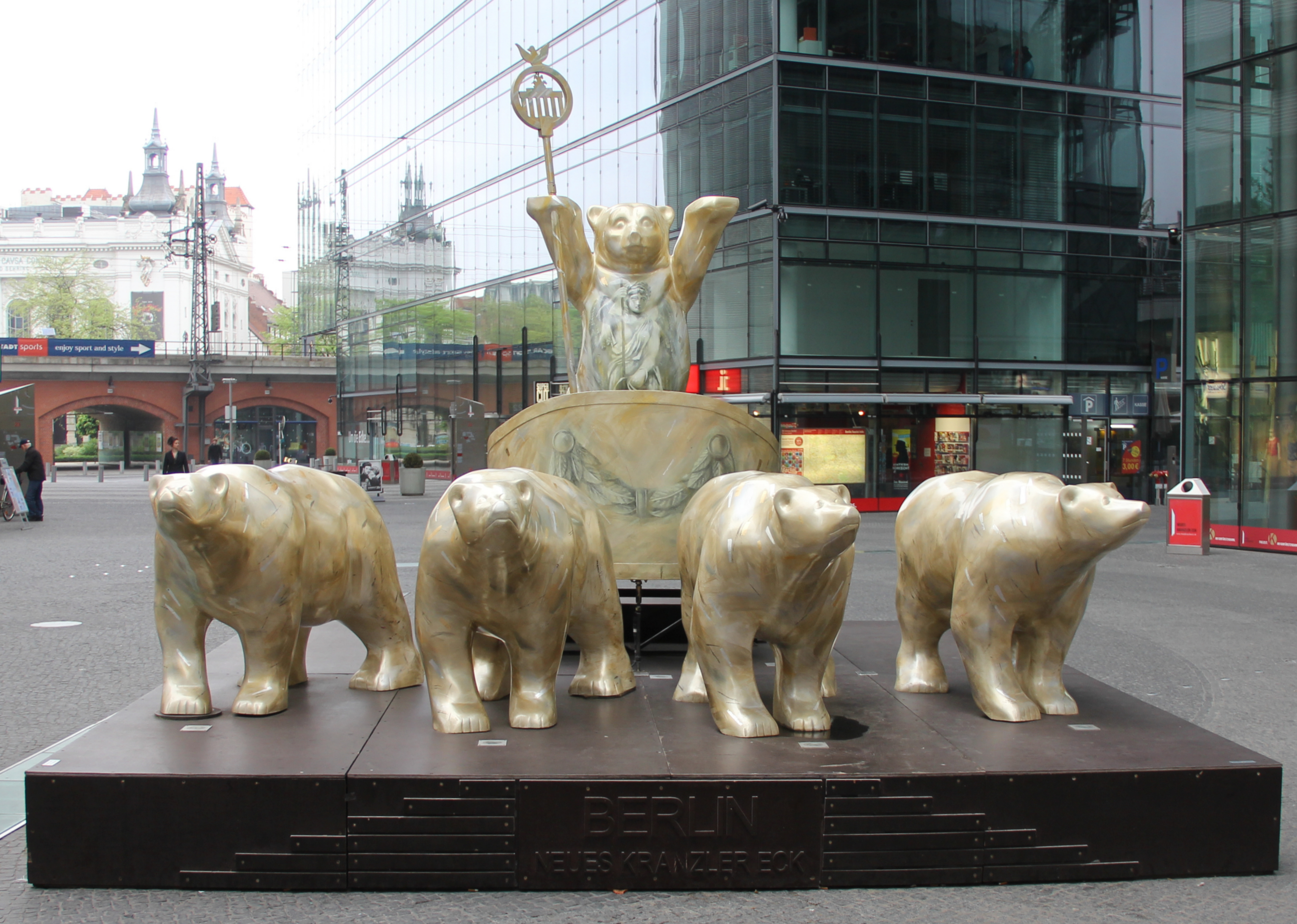
Buddy Bear Quadriga in Berlin, Kurfürstendamm 21

== Modern quadrigas ==
Some of the most significant full-size free-standing sculptures of quadrigas include, in approximate chronological order:

- 1793 – The Berlin Quadriga was designed by Johann Gottfried Schadow in 1793 as the Quadriga of Victory, perhaps as a symbol of peace, represented by the olive wreath carried by Victory. Located atop the Brandenburg Gate in Berlin, Germany, it was seized by Napoleon during his occupation of Berlin in 1806, and taken to Paris. It was returned to Berlin by Field Marshal Gebhard von Blücher in 1814. Her olive wreath was supplemented with an Iron Cross. The statue suffered severe damage during the Second World War. The association of the Iron Cross with Prussian militarism convinced the Communist government of East Germany to remove this aspect of the statue after the war. The iron cross was restored after German reunification in 1990.
- c. 1815 – The Carrousel quadriga is situated atop the Arc de Triomphe du Carrousel in Paris, France. The arch was built to commemorate the victories of Napoleon. The quadriga was sculpted by Baron François Joseph Bosio to commemorate the Restoration of the Bourbons. The restoration is represented by an allegorical goddess driving a quadriga, with gilded Victories accompanying it on each side.
- 1819–1829 – The quadriga on the General Staff Building on the Palace Square in Saint Petersburg
- 1828–1832 – The quadriga on the Alexandrinsky Theater, in Saint Petersburg
- c. 1841 – The panther-driven quadriga on the Semperoper opera house in Dresden
- 1845–1848 – The quadriga on top of Thorvaldsen Museum in Copenhagen by Herman Wilhelm Bissen and Stephan Ussing

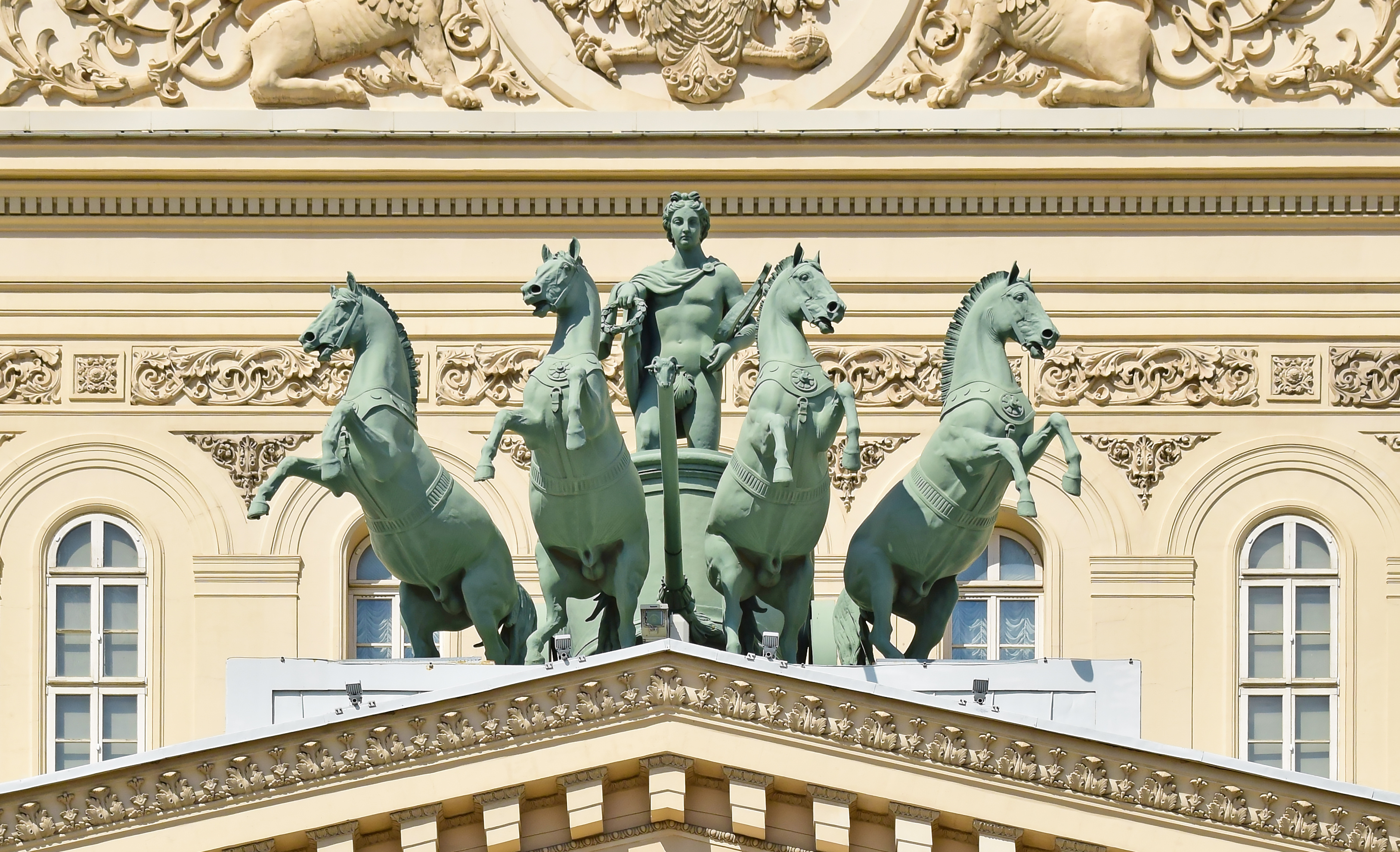
The quadriga driven by Apollo, a sculptural composition on the pediment of the Bolshoi Theatre, Moscow

- c. 1850 – The quadriga on the Bolshoi, above the portico of the Bolshoi Theatre, designed by sculptor Peter Clodt von Jürgensburg
- c. 1852 – The Siegestor (Victory Gate) in Munich is topped by a lion quadriga created by Martin von Wagner.
- 1868 – The quadriga on the ducal palace in Braunschweig was destroyed in 1944 during the Second World War. It was reconstructed in 2008 and is considered the largest one in Europe.
- 1888 – Quadriga de l'Aurora as part of the Font de la cascada that is in Parc de la Ciutadella, Barcelona. Erected by Josep Fontserè, with possible contributions by the young Antoni Gaudí.
- 1893 – Columbus Quadriga atop the Peristyle Building, World's Columbian Exposition, Daniel Chester French, sculpture
- 1895 – The quadriga of Brabant, situated on top from Parc du Cinquantenaire (1880–1905). Constructed to mark the 50 years of Belgian Independence, in Brussels, Belgium, was built by Thomas Vinçotte and Jules Lagae.
- c. 1898 – Atop Soldiers' and Sailors' Arch at Grand Army Plaza in Brooklyn, New York, lady Columbia, an allegorical representation of the United States, rides in a chariot drawn by two horses. Two winged Victory figures, each leading a horse, trumpet Columbia's arrival. The sculptor was Frederick William MacMonnies.
- c. 1900 – Two quadrigas on the Grand Palais in Paris, the work of French sculptor Georges Récipon
- 1904 – Victory and Progress, horse-drawn chariots by J. Massey Rhind on the Wayne County Building in Detroit, Michigan, though each of the two chariots is drawn by three instead of the customary four horses.

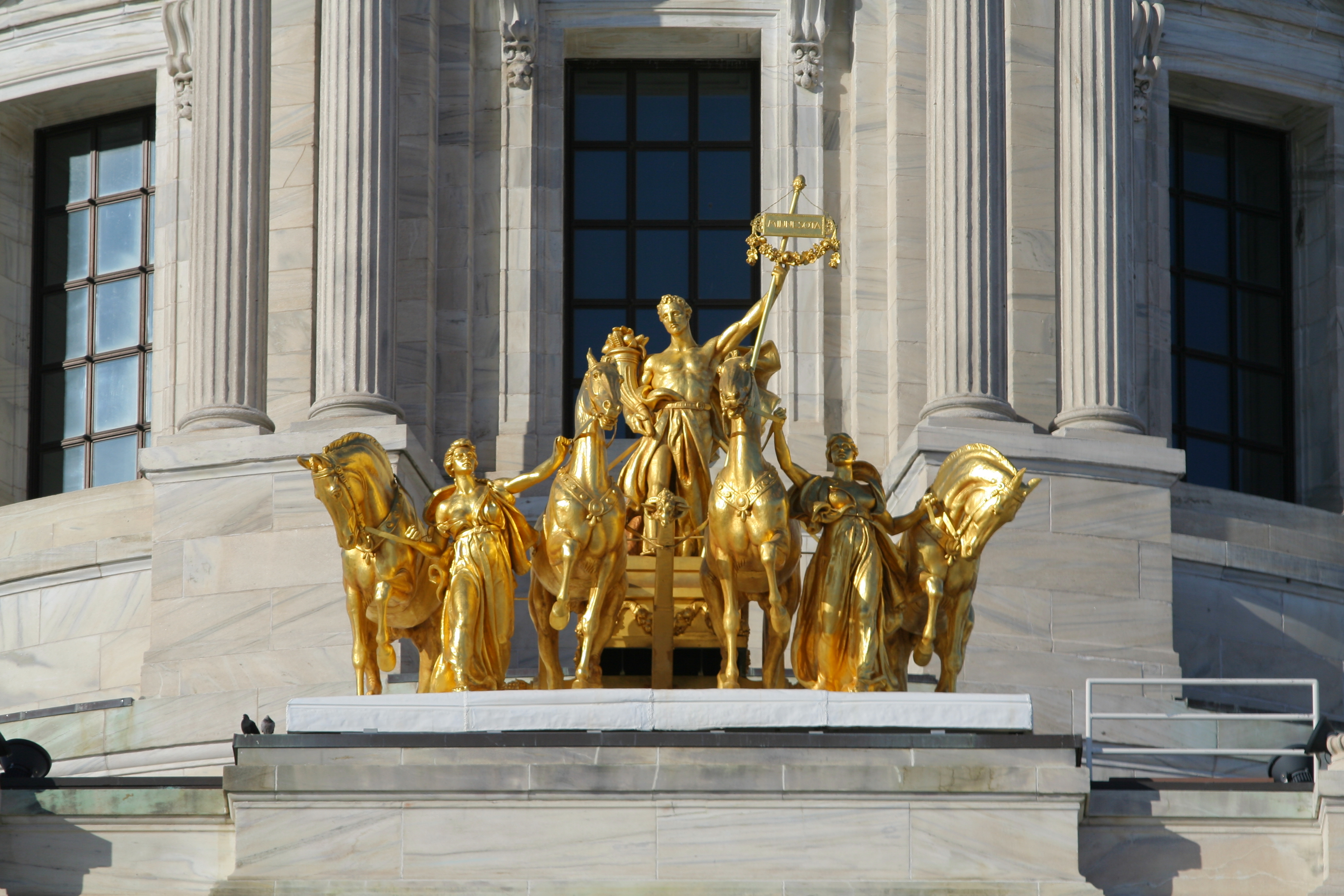
The Progress of the State quadriga, at the Minnesota State Capitol in Saint Paul, Minnesota

- 1906 – Progress of the State at the Minnesota State Capitol is unique for being entirely covered in gold leaf, and is situated above a building entrance rather than a triumphal arch. It was sculpted by Daniel Chester French and Edward Clark Potter.
- 1911–1935 – The Monument to Vittorio Emanuele II (Monument of Victor Emmanuel II, or Altare della Patria (Altar of the Nation), or Il Vittoriano) in Rome, Italy, features two statues of goddess Victoria riding on quadrigas.
- 1912 – The Wellington Arch Quadriga is situated atop the Wellington Arch in London, England. It was designed by Adrian Jones. The sculpture shows a small boy, the son of Lord Michelham, the man who funded the sculpture, leading the quadriga, with Peace descending upon it from heaven.
- 1919–1923 – The former Banco di Bilbao headquarters at no. 16 Calle de Alcalá in Madrid, now part of Banco Bilbao Vizcaya Argentaria, features two quadrigas on a commercial building. The building was designed by Ricardo Bastida, with the sculptor of the chariot Higinio Basterras, and other sculptures by Quentin de la Torre. The charioteers are helmeted men standing on the handrails of the chariots. Height to plinth: about 87 feet (27 meters).
- 1926 – The Palace of Justice in Rome, seat of the modern Supreme Court of Cassation, features a bronze quadriga by sculptor Ettore Ximenes.
- 2002 – The Warsaw's Grand Theatre features a quadriga reflecting the original Antonio Corazzi's 1833 plans for the building, but not commissioned and executed until 2002.
- 2020 — Kentucky State University unveiled statue replicas of the four Horses of Saint Mark which were positioned on a rise near the entrance to the university.

== Gallery ==
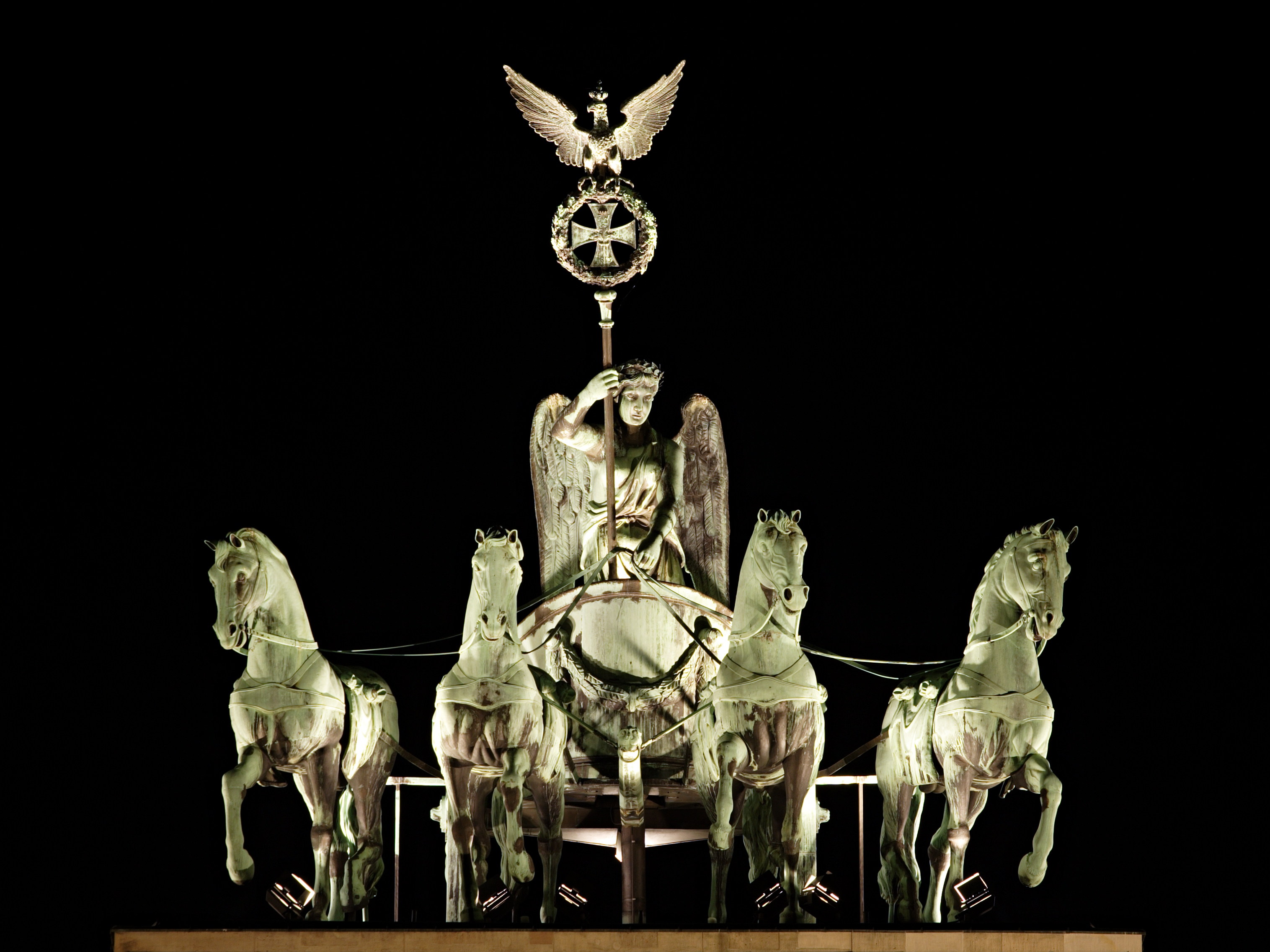
Brandenburg Gate Quadriga at night

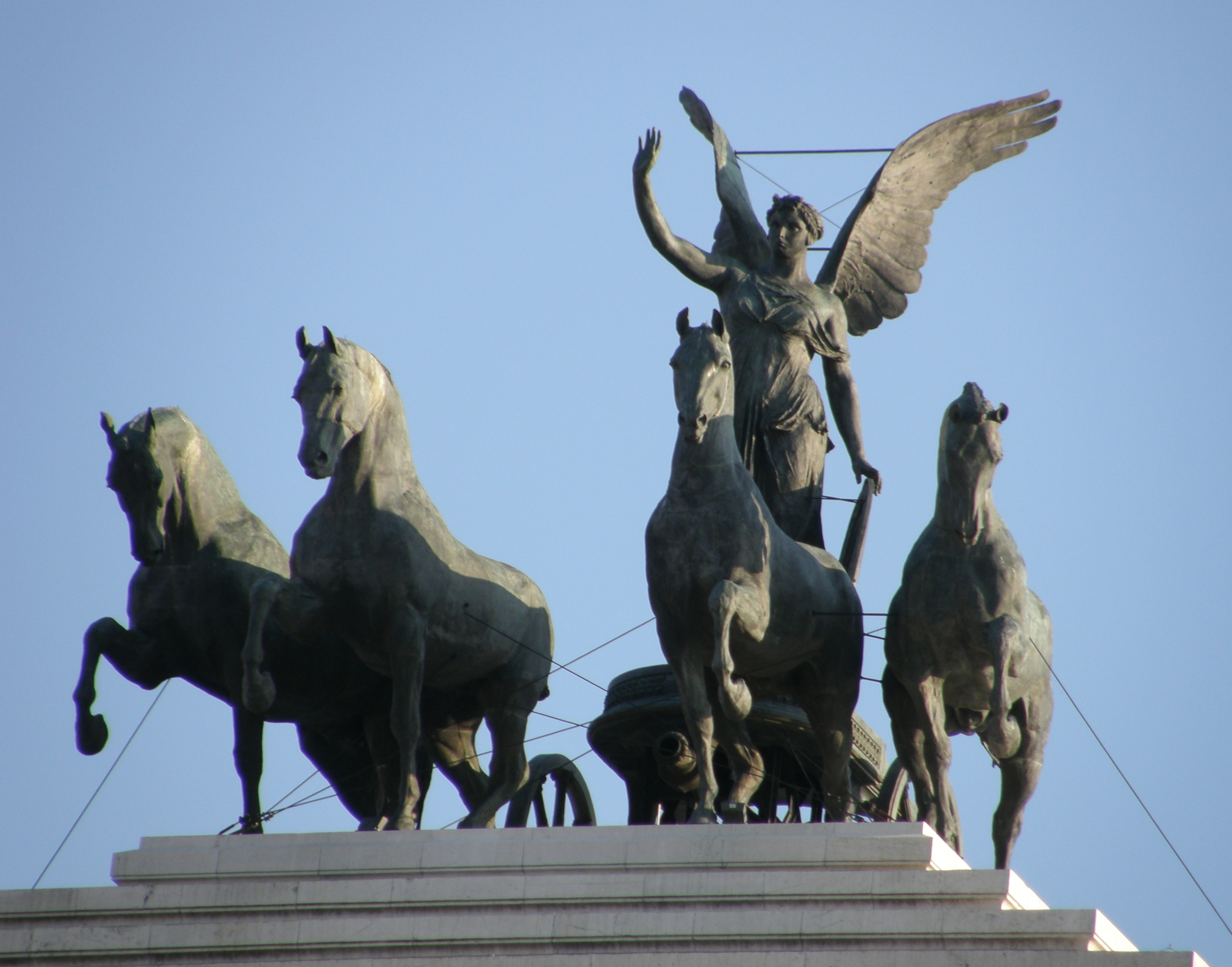
The Quadriga dell'Unità at Vittoriano, Rome

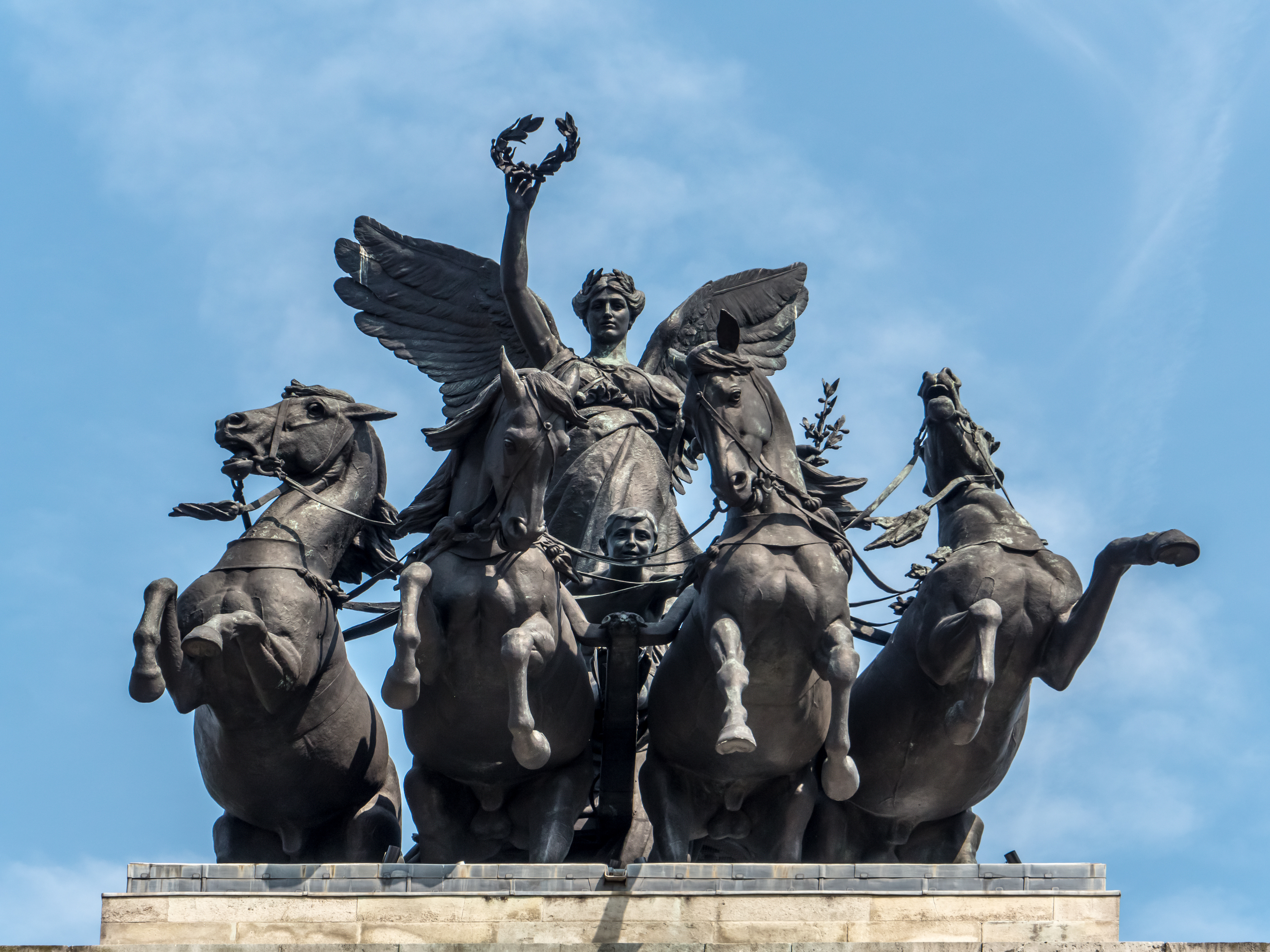
Quadriga, Wellington Arch, London

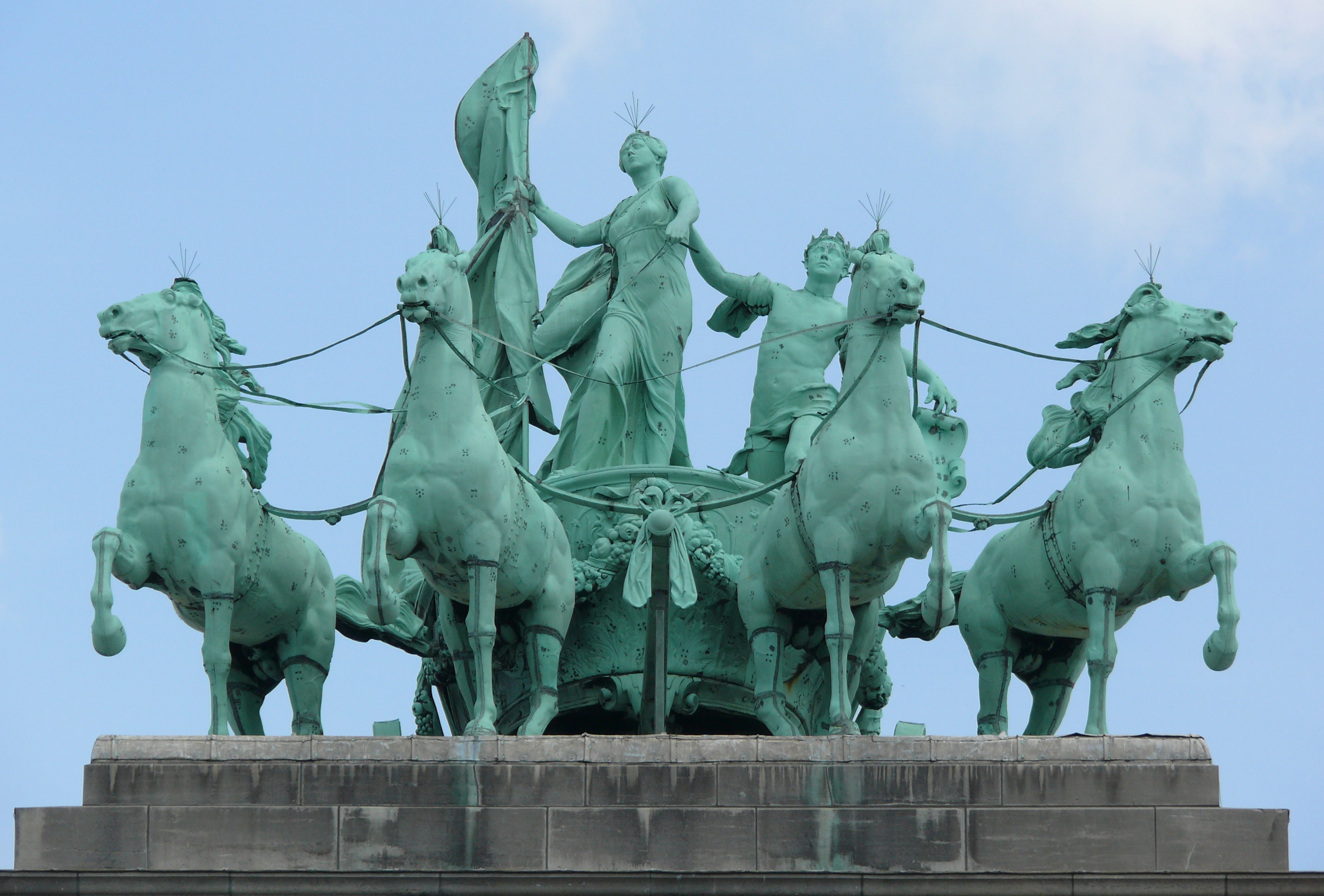
Brabant Raising the National Flag or Quadriga of Brabant, Parc du Cinquantenaire, Brussels

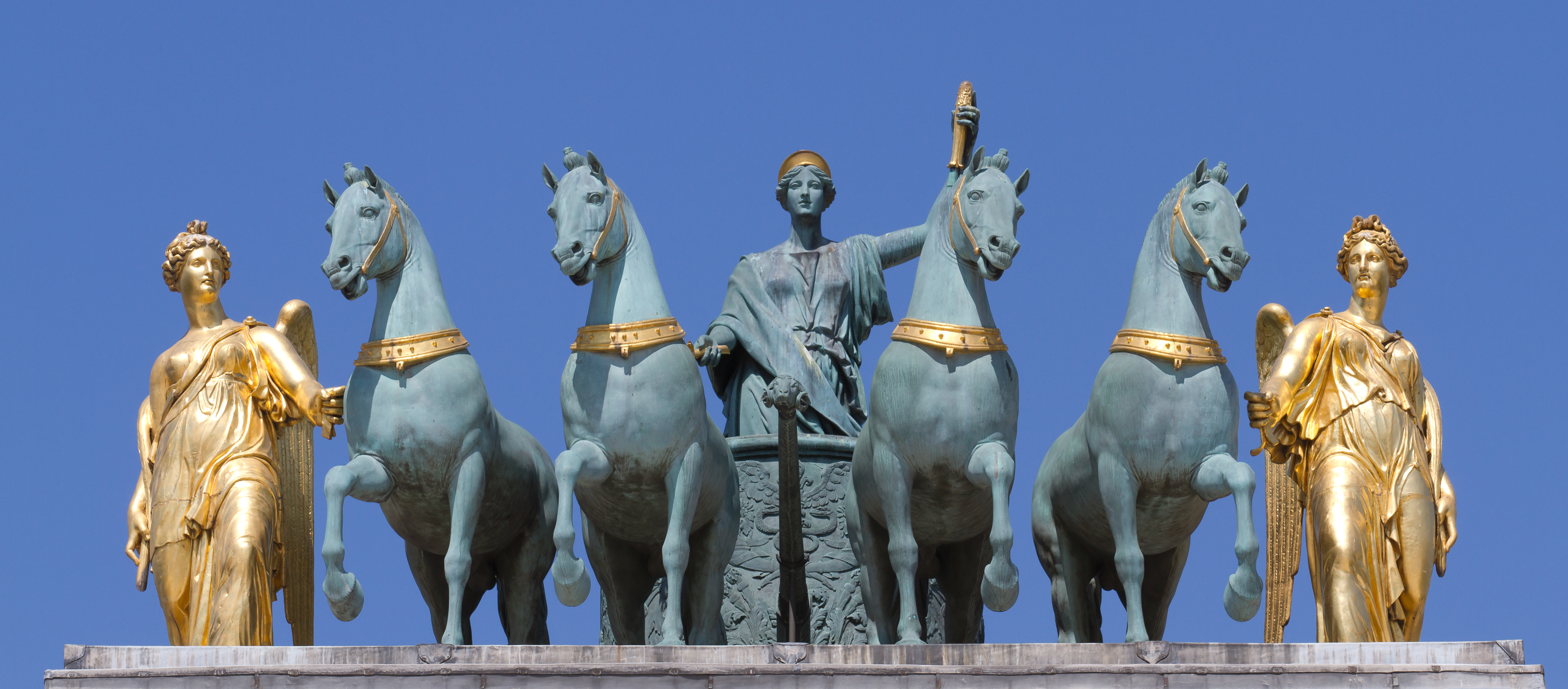
Quadriga, Arc de Triomphe du Carrousel, Paris

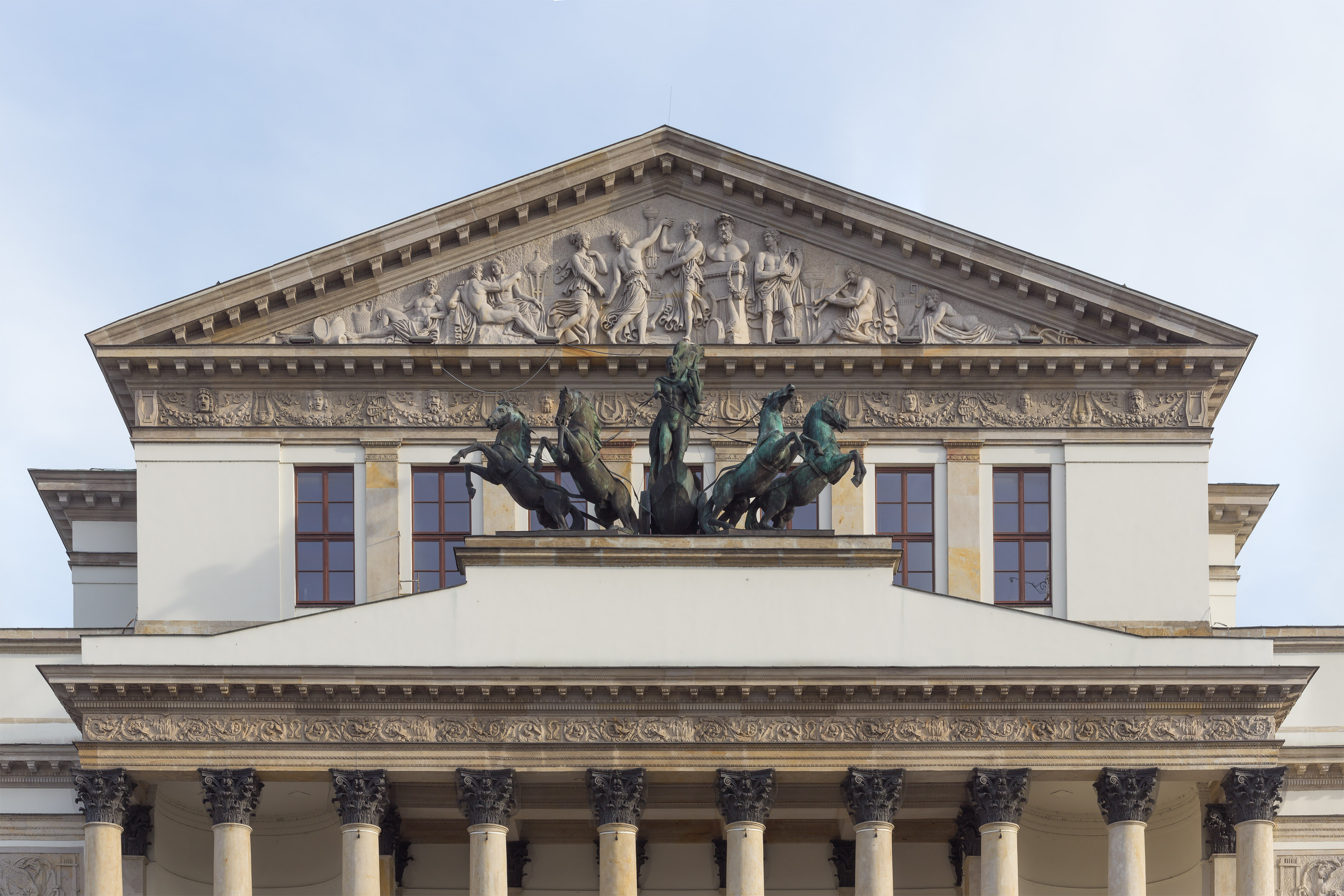
Quadriga, Grand Theatre, Warsaw

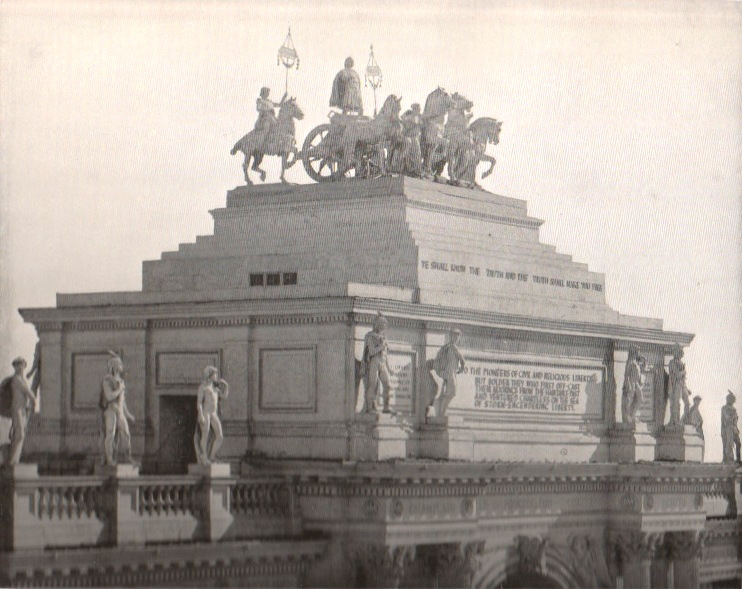
Quadriga by Daniel Chester French, World's Columbian Exposition, 1893

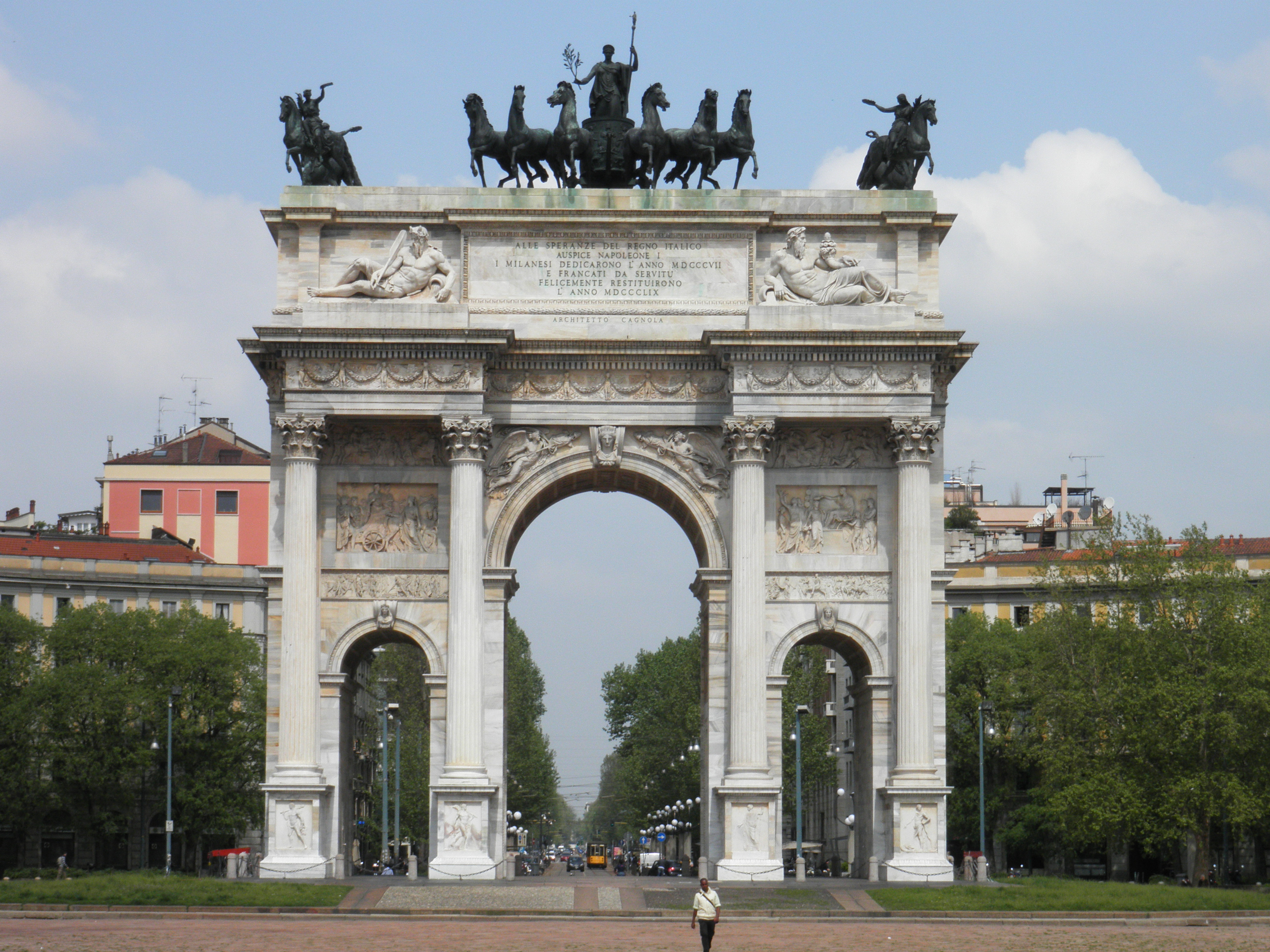
The Seiugae of the Arch of Peace in Milan

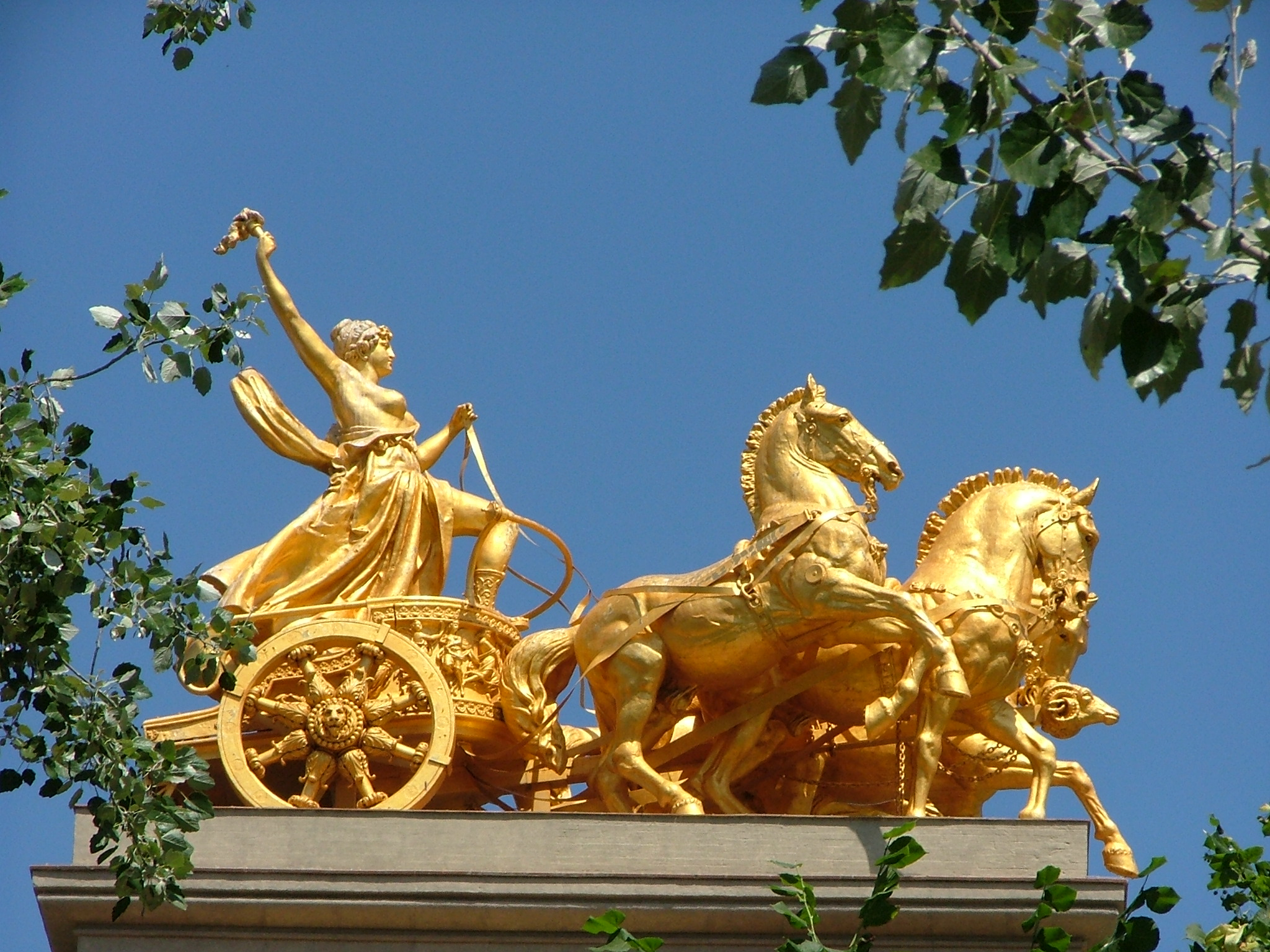
Quadriga in the Parc de la Ciutadella in Barcelona

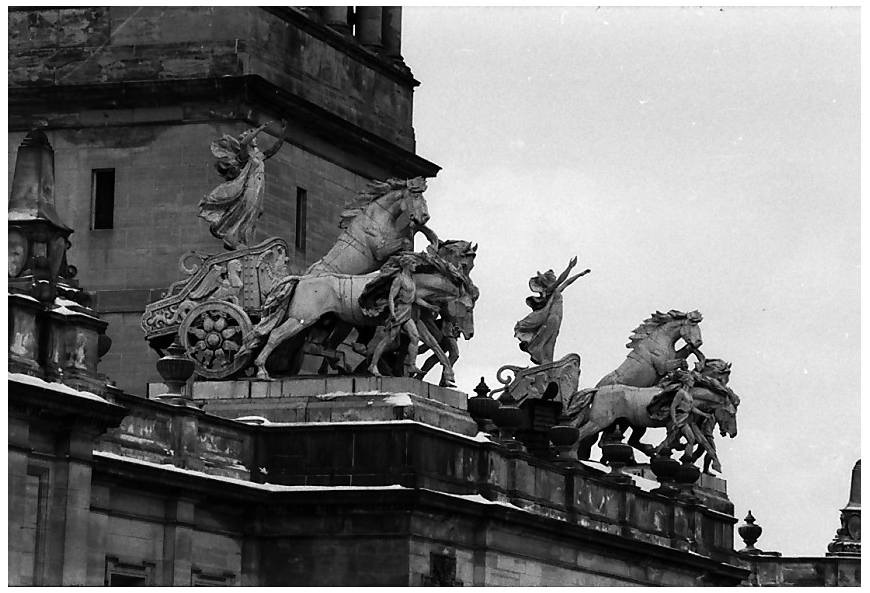
Wayne County Building, Detroit, Michigan, by J. Massey Rhind

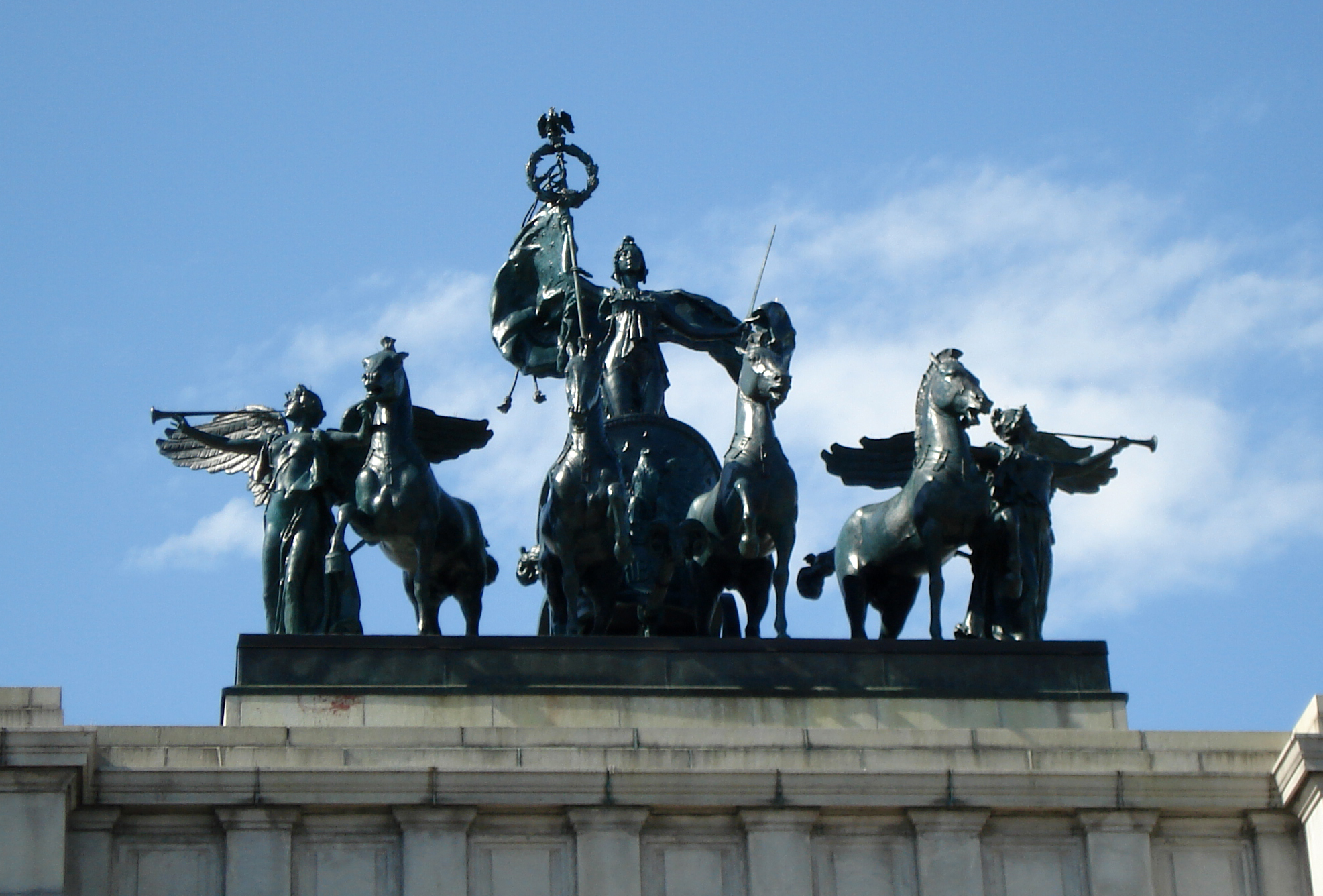
Soldiers' and Sailors' Arch Brooklyn, New York

== See also ==
- Horses of Saint Mark in Venice, remnants of a quadriga of Constantinople taken by Enrico Dandolo
- Biga, the ancient two-horse chariot
- Trigarium (triga)
- Troika
- Coach (carriage)
