= 1991 Spanish local elections in the Basque Country =

This article presents the results breakdown of the local elections held in the Basque Country on 26 May 1991. The following tables show detailed results in the autonomous community's most populous municipalities, sorted alphabetically.

== City control ==
The following table lists party control in the most populous municipalities, including provincial capitals (highlighted in bold). Gains for a party are highlighted in that party's colour.

Municipality	Population	Previous control	New control
Barakaldo	108,588	Socialist Party of the Basque Country (PSE–PSOE)	Socialist Party of the Basque Country (PSE–PSOE)
Basauri	50,941	Socialist Party of the Basque Country (PSE–PSOE)	Basque Nationalist Party (EAJ/PNV)
**Bilbao**	383,798	Basque Nationalist Party (EAJ/PNV)	Basque Nationalist Party (EAJ/PNV)
**Donostia-San Sebastián**	183,944	Basque Solidarity (EA)	Socialist Party of the Basque Country (PSE–PSOE)
Getxo	81,795	Basque Nationalist Party (EAJ/PNV)	Basque Nationalist Party (EAJ/PNV)
Irun	55,200	Socialist Party of the Basque Country (PSE–PSOE)	Socialist Party of the Basque Country (PSE–PSOE)
Portugalete	57,157	Socialist Party of the Basque Country (PSE–PSOE)	Socialist Party of the Basque Country (PSE–PSOE)
Rentería	42,441	Socialist Party of the Basque Country (PSE–PSOE)	Socialist Party of the Basque Country (PSE–PSOE)
Santurtzi	51,706	Socialist Party of the Basque Country (PSE–PSOE)	Socialist Party of the Basque Country (PSE–PSOE)
**Vitoria-Gasteiz**	209,506	Basque Nationalist Party (EAJ/PNV)	Basque Nationalist Party (EAJ/PNV)

== Municipalities ==
=== Barakaldo ===
Population: 108,588

← Summary of the 26 May 1991 City Council of Barakaldo election results →
Parties and alliances	Popular vote			Seats	
Parties and alliances	Votes	%	±pp	Total	+/−
Socialist Party of the Basque Country (PSE–PSOE)	14,756	31.78	+3.99	10	+1
Basque Nationalist Party (EAJ/PNV)	12,875	27.73	+6.20	8	+2
Popular Unity (HB)	6,332	13.64	−3.07	4	−1
People's Party (PP)^{1}	3,851	8.29	+3.26	2	+2
Basque Country Left (EE)	3,044	6.56	−2.78	2	−1
Basque Solidarity (EA)	2,501	5.39	−4.11	1	−2
United Left (IU/EB)	1,992	4.29	+2.83	0	±0
Democratic and Social Centre (CDS)	420	0.90	−4.93	0	−1
Workers' Socialist Party (PST)	193	0.42	New	0	±0
Blank ballots	471	1.01	+0.06		
Total	46,435			27	±0
Valid votes	46,435	99.21	+0.04		
Invalid votes	369	0.79	−0.04		
Votes cast / turnout	46,804	54.37	−9.53		
Abstentions	39,281	45.63	+9.53		
Registered voters	86,085				
Sources
Footnotes: ^{1} People's Party results are compared to the combined totals of People's Alliance and People's Democratic Party in the 1987 election.

=== Basauri ===
Population: 50,941

← Summary of the 26 May 1991 City Council of Basauri election results →
Parties and alliances	Popular vote			Seats	
Parties and alliances	Votes	%	±pp	Total	+/−
Basque Nationalist Party (EAJ/PNV)	7,815	35.45	+11.28	11	+4
Socialist Party of the Basque Country (PSE–PSOE)	7,057	32.01	+6.10	9	+1
Popular Unity (HB)	3,103	14.07	−4.01	4	−1
Basque Country Left (EE)	1,169	5.30	−2.78	1	−1
People's Party (PP)^{1}	1,097	4.98	+1.04	0	±0
Basque Solidarity (EA)	752	3.41	−5.02	0	−2
United Left (IU/EB)	651	2.95	+0.63	0	±0
Democratic and Social Centre (CDS)	187	0.85	−3.71	0	±0
Carlist Party (EKA/PC)	18	0.08	New	0	±0
Blank ballots	198	0.90	−0.29		
Total	22,047			25	±0
Valid votes	22,047	99.36	+0.43		
Invalid votes	143	0.64	−0.43		
Votes cast / turnout	22,190	55.81	−8.86		
Abstentions	17,571	44.19	+8.86		
Registered voters	39,761				
Sources
Footnotes: ^{1} People's Party results are compared to People's Alliance totals in the 1987 election.

=== Bilbao ===
Population: 383,798

← Summary of the 26 May 1991 City Council of Bilbao election results →
Parties and alliances	Popular vote			Seats	
Parties and alliances	Votes	%	±pp	Total	+/−
Basque Nationalist Party (EAJ/PNV)	57,639	34.72	+6.70	11	+2
Socialist Party of the Basque Country (PSE–PSOE)	34,849	20.99	+0.39	6	−1
People's Party (PP)^{1}	23,436	14.12	+5.19	4	+2
Popular Unity (HB)	20,180	12.16	−2.71	4	−1
Basque Country Left (EE)	11,504	6.93	−2.22	2	−1
Basque Solidarity (EA)	10,370	6.25	−4.58	2	−1
United Left (IU/EB)	2,864	1.73	+1.02	0	±0
Basque Country Greens (EHB)	1,449	0.87	New	0	±0
Democratic and Social Centre (CDS)	1,260	0.76	−4.19	0	±0
Workers' Socialist Party (PST)	447	0.27	New	0	±0
Alliance for the Republic (AxR)^{2}	215	0.13	+0.01	0	±0
Carlist Party (EKA/PC)	157	0.09	New	0	±0
Blank ballots	1,636	0.99	+0.10		
Total	166,006			29	±0
Valid votes	166,006	99.26	+0.14		
Invalid votes	1,238	0.74	−0.14		
Votes cast / turnout	167,244	53.61	−10.38		
Abstentions	144,720	46.39	+10.38		
Registered voters	311,964				
Sources
Footnotes: ^{1} People's Party results are compared to the combined totals of People's Alliance and People's Democratic Party in the 1987 election.; ^{2} Alliance for the Republic results are compared to Internationalist Socialist Workers' Party totals in the 1987 election.

=== Donostia-San Sebastián ===
Population: 183,944

← Summary of the 26 May 1991 City Council of Donostia-San Sebastián election results →
Parties and alliances	Popular vote			Seats	
Parties and alliances	Votes	%	±pp	Total	+/−
Basque Solidarity (EA)	17,859	22.36	−1.95	6	−1
Popular Unity (HB)	13,791	17.27	−3.43	5	−1
Socialist Party of the Basque Country (PSE–PSOE)	13,526	16.93	+0.93	5	±0
People's Party (PP)^{1}	13,036	16.32	+4.09	5	+2
Basque Nationalist Party (EAJ/PNV)	12,170	15.24	+6.04	4	+2
Basque Country Left (EE)	6,922	8.67	−4.31	2	−2
United Left (IU/EB)	809	1.01	+0.72	0	±0
Basque Country Greens (EHB)	587	0.73	New	0	±0
Democratic and Social Centre (CDS)	300	0.38	−2.52	0	±0
Left Platform (PCE (m–l)–CRPE)	82	0.10	New	0	±0
Blank ballots	792	0.99	+0.25		
Total	79,874			27	±0
Valid votes	79,874	99.50	+0.39		
Invalid votes	400	0.50	−0.39		
Votes cast / turnout	80,274	56.17	−7.58		
Abstentions	62,648	43.83	+7.58		
Registered voters	142,922				
Sources
Footnotes: ^{1} People's Party results are compared to the combined totals of People's Alliance and People's Democratic Party–Liberal Party in the 1987 election.

=== Getxo ===
Population: 81,795

← Summary of the 26 May 1991 City Council of Getxo election results →
Parties and alliances	Popular vote			Seats	
Parties and alliances	Votes	%	±pp	Total	+/−
Basque Nationalist Party (EAJ/PNV)	13,164	37.89	+6.26	11	+2
People's Party (PP)^{1}	7,034	20.24	+5.57	5	+1
Popular Unity (HB)	4,333	12.47	−2.03	3	−1
Socialist Party of the Basque Country (PSE–PSOE)	3,563	10.25	+0.62	2	±0
Basque Solidarity (EA)	3,000	8.63	−5.80	2	−2
Basque Country Left (EE)	2,645	7.61	−2.73	2	±0
United Left (IU/EB)	400	1.15	New	0	±0
Democratic and Social Centre (CDS)	127	0.37	−2.98	0	±0
Blank ballots	481	1.38	+0.65		
Total	34,747			25	±0
Valid votes	34,747	99.25	−0.18		
Invalid votes	263	0.75	+0.18		
Votes cast / turnout	35,010	56.97	−7.27		
Abstentions	26,448	43.03	+7.27		
Registered voters	61,458				
Sources
Footnotes: ^{1} People's Party results are compared to the combined totals of People's Alliance and People's Democratic Party in the 1987 election.

=== Irun ===
Population: 55,200

← Summary of the 26 May 1991 City Council of Irun election results →
Parties and alliances	Popular vote			Seats	
Parties and alliances	Votes	%	±pp	Total	+/−
Socialist Party of the Basque Country (PSE–PSOE)	7,282	31.33	−1.06	9	±0
Basque Nationalist Party (EAJ/PNV)	4,538	19.53	+10.33	5	+3
Popular Unity (HB)	3,266	14.05	−1.47	4	±0
Basque Solidarity (EA)	2,678	11.52	−5.63	3	−2
People's Party (PP)^{1}	2,296	9.88	+4.04	2	+1
Basque Country Left (EE)	2,017	8.68	−2.45	2	−1
United Left (IU/EB)	470	2.02	+1.38	0	±0
Democratic and Social Centre (CDS)	446	1.92	−3.74	0	−1
Blank ballots	248	1.07	+0.07		
Total	23,241			25	±0
Valid votes	23,241	99.35	+0.36		
Invalid votes	153	0.65	−0.36		
Votes cast / turnout	23,394	54.43	−9.08		
Abstentions	19,584	45.57	+9.08		
Registered voters	42,978				
Sources
Footnotes: ^{1} People's Party results are compared to People's Alliance totals in the 1987 election.

=== Portugalete ===
Population: 57,156

← Summary of the 26 May 1991 City Council of Portugalete election results →
Parties and alliances	Popular vote			Seats	
Parties and alliances	Votes	%	±pp	Total	+/−
Socialist Party of the Basque Country (PSE–PSOE)	8,817	35.25	+3.31	10	±0
Basque Nationalist Party (EAJ/PNV)	5,961	23.83	+8.67	6	+1
Popular Unity (HB)	2,816	11.26	−2.95	3	−1
People's Party (PP)^{1}	1,945	7.78	+3.04	2	+2
Basque Country Left (EE)	1,905	7.62	−4.15	2	−1
United Left (IU/EB)	1,813	7.25	+4.66	2	+2
Basque Solidarity (EA)	1,172	4.69	−2.35	0	−2
Democratic and Social Centre (CDS)	334	1.34	−3.88	0	−1
Blank ballots	247	0.99	+0.20		
Total	25,010			25	±0
Valid votes	25,010	99.21	−0.21		
Invalid votes	200	0.79	+0.21		
Votes cast / turnout	25,210	55.32	−8.52		
Abstentions	20,634	44.68	+8.52		
Registered voters	45,574				
Sources
Footnotes: ^{1} People's Party results are compared to People's Alliance totals in the 1987 election.

=== Rentería ===
Population: 42,441

← Summary of the 26 May 1991 City Council of Rentería election results →
Parties and alliances	Popular vote			Seats	
Parties and alliances	Votes	%	±pp	Total	+/−
Socialist Party of the Basque Country (PSE–PSOE)	6,574	36.06	+4.50	9	+2
Popular Unity (HB)	4,777	26.21	−1.59	6	−1
Basque Solidarity (EA)	1,895	10.40	−5.33	2	−1
Basque Nationalist Party (EAJ/PNV)	1,820	9.98	+4.11	2	+1
Basque Country Left (EE)	1,717	9.42	−3.45	2	−1
People's Party (PP)^{1}	750	4.11	+0.68	0	±0
United Left (IU/EB)	378	2.07	+0.52	0	±0
Democratic and Social Centre (CDS)	137	0.75	New	0	±0
Left Platform (PCE (m–l)–CRPE)	48	0.26	New	0	±0
Blank ballots	133	0.73	−0.26		
Total	18,229			21	±0
Valid votes	18,229	99.28	+0.29		
Invalid votes	132	0.72	−0.29		
Votes cast / turnout	18,361	55.43	−10.50		
Abstentions	14,762	44.57	+10.50		
Registered voters	33,123				
Sources
Footnotes: ^{1} People's Party results are compared to People's Alliance totals in the 1987 election.

=== Santurtzi ===
Population: 51,706

← Summary of the 26 May 1991 City Council of Santurtzi election results →
Parties and alliances	Popular vote			Seats	
Parties and alliances	Votes	%	±pp	Total	+/−
Socialist Party of the Basque Country (PSE–PSOE)	7,167	33.21	+2.66	10	+1
Basque Nationalist Party (EAJ/PNV)	5,484	25.41	+9.21	7	+3
Popular Unity (HB)	3,586	16.62	−2.87	5	−1
Basque Country Left (EE)	1,424	6.60	−3.19	1	−2
People's Party (PP)^{1}	1,335	6.19	+1.43	1	+1
Basque Solidarity (EA)	1,109	5.14	−6.39	1	−2
United Left (IU/EB)	1,051	4.87	+2.58	0	±0
Democratic and Social Centre (CDS)	257	1.19	−2.06	0	±0
Blank ballots	167	0.77	−0.09		
Total	21,580			25	±0
Valid votes	21,580	99.39	+0.32		
Invalid votes	133	0.61	−0.32		
Votes cast / turnout	21,713	53.83	−9.16		
Abstentions	18,626	46.17	+9.16		
Registered voters	40,339				
Sources
Footnotes: ^{1} People's Party results are compared to the combined totals of People's Alliance and People's Democratic Party in the 1987 election.

=== Vitoria-Gasteiz ===
Population: 209,506

← Summary of the 26 May 1991 City Council of Vitoria-Gasteiz election results →
Parties and alliances	Popular vote			Seats	
Parties and alliances	Votes	%	±pp	Total	+/−
Basque Nationalist Party (EAJ/PNV)	22,430	26.34	+17.27	8	+6
Alavese Unity (UA)	18,749	22.02	New	7	+7
Socialist Party of the Basque Country (PSE–PSOE)	15,986	18.78	−1.23	6	±0
Popular Unity (HB)	7,779	9.14	−2.10	3	±0
People's Party (PP)^{1}	7,061	8.29	−0.76	2	±0
Basque Solidarity (EA)	4,542	5.33	−27.20	1	−9
Basque Country Left (EE)	3,553	4.17	−2.39	0	−2
Democratic and Social Centre (CDS)	1,667	1.96	−6.68	0	−2
United Left (IU/EB)	1,159	1.36	+0.90	0	±0
Green Union (UVE)	508	0.60	New	0	±0
Vitorian Youth (JV)	445	0.52	New	0	±0
Basque Country Greens (EHB)	310	0.36	New	0	±0
Alliance for the Republic (AxR)	114	0.13	New	0	±0
Blank ballots	837	0.98	−0.03		
Total	85,140			27	±0
Valid votes	85,140	99.21	+0.12		
Invalid votes	675	0.79	−0.12		
Votes cast / turnout	85,815	53.85	−12.93		
Abstentions	73,542	46.15	+12.93		
Registered voters	159,357				
Sources
Footnotes: ^{1} People's Party results are compared to the combined totals of People's Alliance and People's Democratic Party in the 1987 election.
