= 1999 Spanish local elections in the Basque Country =

This article presents the results breakdown of the local elections held in the Basque Country on 13 June 1999. The following tables show detailed results in the autonomous community's most populous municipalities, sorted alphabetically.

== City control ==
The following table lists party control in the most populous municipalities, including provincial capitals (highlighted in bold). Gains for a party are highlighted in that party's colour.

| Municipality | Population | Previous control | New control |
|---|---|---|---|
| Barakaldo | 98,649 | Socialist Party of the Basque Country (PSE–EE (PSOE)) | Socialist Party of the Basque Country (PSE–EE (PSOE)) |
| Basauri | 48,107 | Basque Nationalist Party (EAJ/PNV) | Basque Nationalist Party (EAJ/PNV) |
| **Bilbao** | 358,467 | Basque Nationalist Party (EAJ/PNV) | Basque Nationalist Party (EAJ/PNV) |
| **Donostia-San Sebastián** | 178,229 | Socialist Party of the Basque Country (PSE–EE (PSOE)) | Socialist Party of the Basque Country (PSE–EE (PSOE)) |
| Errenteria | 39,376 | Socialist Party of the Basque Country (PSE–EE (PSOE)) | Socialist Party of the Basque Country (PSE–EE (PSOE)) |
| Getxo | 82,974 | Basque Nationalist Party (EAJ/PNV) | Basque Nationalist Party (EAJ/PNV) |
| Irun | 55,196 | Socialist Party of the Basque Country (PSE–EE (PSOE)) | Socialist Party of the Basque Country (PSE–EE (PSOE)) |
| Portugalete | 53,498 | Socialist Party of the Basque Country (PSE–EE (PSOE)) | Socialist Party of the Basque Country (PSE–EE (PSOE)) |
| Santurtzi | 48,962 | Socialist Party of the Basque Country (PSE–EE (PSOE)) | Socialist Party of the Basque Country (PSE–EE (PSOE)) |
| **Vitoria-Gasteiz** | 216,527 | Basque Nationalist Party (EAJ/PNV) | People's Party (PP) |

== Municipalities ==
=== Barakaldo ===
Population: 98,649

← Summary of the 13 June 1999 City Council of Barakaldo election results →
| Parties and alliances | Popular vote | | | Seats | |
| Parties and alliances | Votes | % | ±pp | Total | +/− |
|---|---|---|---|---|---|
| Socialist Party of the Basque Country–Basque Country Left (PSE–EE (PSOE)) | 16,653 | 33.35 | +3.81 | 9 | ±0 |
| Basque Nationalist Party–Basque Solidarity (PNV–EA)^{1} | 11,286 | 22.60 | −4.10 | 6 | −1 |
| People's Party (PP) | 10,331 | 20.69 | +4.09 | 5 | ±0 |
| Basque Citizens (EH)^{2} | 6,389 | 12.79 | +3.69 | 3 | +1 |
| United Left (IU/EB) | 4,053 | 8.12 | −5.47 | 2 | −2 |
| Basque Citizen Initiative (ICV/EHE) | 448 | 0.90 | New | 0 | ±0 |
| Blank ballots | 776 | 1.55 | −0.02 | | |
| Total | 49,936 | | | 25 | −2 |
| Valid votes | 49,936 | 99.33 | −0.03 | | |
| Invalid votes | 339 | 0.67 | +0.03 | | |
| Votes cast / turnout | 50,275 | 58.66 | −1.91 | | |
| Abstentions | 35,438 | 41.34 | +1.91 | | |
| Registered voters | 85,713 | | | | |
Sources
Footnotes: ^{1} Basque Nationalist Party–Basque Solidarity results are compared to the combined totals of Basque Nationalist Party and Basque Solidarity in the 1995 election.; ^{2} Basque Citizens results are compared to Popular Unity totals in the 1995 election.

=== Basauri ===
Population: 48,107

← Summary of the 13 June 1999 City Council of Basauri election results →
| Parties and alliances | Popular vote | | | Seats | |
| Parties and alliances | Votes | % | ±pp | Total | +/− |
|---|---|---|---|---|---|
| Basque Nationalist Party–Basque Solidarity (PNV–EA)^{1} | 8,581 | 34.34 | −2.78 | 7 | −2 |
| Socialist Party of the Basque Country–Basque Country Left (PSE–EE (PSOE)) | 6,955 | 27.84 | +1.96 | 6 | −1 |
| People's Party (PP) | 4,412 | 17.66 | +4.10 | 4 | +1 |
| Basque Citizens (EH)^{2} | 3,271 | 13.09 | +2.36 | 3 | ±0 |
| United Left (IU/EB) | 1,303 | 5.22 | −5.64 | 1 | −2 |
| Humanist Party (PH) | 124 | 0.50 | +0.22 | 0 | ±0 |
| Blank ballots | 339 | 1.36 | −0.21 | | |
| Total | 24,985 | | | 21 | −4 |
| Valid votes | 24,985 | 99.32 | +0.07 | | |
| Invalid votes | 172 | 0.68 | −0.07 | | |
| Votes cast / turnout | 25,157 | 60.81 | +2.12 | | |
| Abstentions | 16,215 | 39.19 | −2.12 | | |
| Registered voters | 41,372 | | | | |
Sources
Footnotes: ^{1} Basque Nationalist Party–Basque Solidarity results are compared to the combined totals of Basque Nationalist Party and Basque Solidarity in the 1995 election.; ^{2} Basque Citizens results are compared to Popular Unity totals in the 1995 election.

=== Bilbao ===
Population: 358,467

← Summary of the 13 June 1999 City Council of Bilbao election results →
| Parties and alliances | Popular vote | | | Seats | |
| Parties and alliances | Votes | % | ±pp | Total | +/− |
|---|---|---|---|---|---|
| Basque Nationalist Party–Basque Solidarity (PNV–EA)^{1} | 58,772 | 31.09 | +0.60 | 9 | ±0 |
| People's Party (PP) | 47,299 | 25.02 | +3.80 | 8 | +1 |
| Socialist Party of the Basque Country–Basque Country Left (PSE–EE (PSOE)) | 31,183 | 16.50 | +2.14 | 5 | +1 |
| Basque Citizens (EH)^{2} | 23,740 | 12.56 | +4.46 | 4 | +2 |
| Basque Citizen Initiative (ICV/EHE) | 14,372 | 7.60 | −9.25 | 2 | −3 |
| United Left (IU/EB) | 9,980 | 5.28 | −2.08 | 1 | −1 |
| The Greens (B/LV) | 989 | 0.52 | New | 0 | ±0 |
| Humanist Party (PH) | 250 | 0.13 | New | 0 | ±0 |
| Blank ballots | 2,455 | 1.30 | −0.11 | | |
| Total | 189,040 | | | 29 | ±0 |
| Valid votes | 189,040 | 99.34 | −0.08 | | |
| Invalid votes | 1,249 | 0.66 | +0.08 | | |
| Votes cast / turnout | 190,289 | 60.67 | −0.47 | | |
| Abstentions | 123,351 | 39.33 | +0.47 | | |
| Registered voters | 313,640 | | | | |
Sources
Footnotes: ^{1} Basque Nationalist Party–Basque Solidarity results are compared to the combined totals of Basque Nationalist Party and Basque Solidarity in the 1995 election.; ^{2} Basque Citizens results are compared to Popular Unity totals in the 1995 election.

=== Donostia-San Sebastián ===
Population: 178,229

← Summary of the 13 June 1999 City Council of Donostia-San Sebastián election results →
| Parties and alliances | Popular vote | | | Seats | |
| Parties and alliances | Votes | % | ±pp | Total | +/− |
|---|---|---|---|---|---|
| Socialist Party of the Basque Country–Basque Country Left (PSE–EE (PSOE)) | 29,977 | 30.05 | +7.20 | 9 | +2 |
| Basque Solidarity–Basque Nationalist Party (EA–PNV)^{1} | 23,440 | 23.50 | −5.60 | 7 | −1 |
| People's Party (PP) | 20,943 | 21.00 | −2.84 | 6 | −1 |
| Basque Citizens (EH)^{2} | 19,567 | 19.62 | +5.30 | 5 | +1 |
| United Left (IU/EB) | 3,119 | 3.13 | −2.12 | 0 | −1 |
| The Greens (B/LV) | 677 | 0.68 | New | 0 | ±0 |
| We, the Women of the Plaza (Plazandreok) | 644 | 0.65 | −1.76 | 0 | ±0 |
| Humanist Party (PH) | 94 | 0.09 | New | 0 | ±0 |
| Blank ballots | 1,284 | 1.29 | −0.75 | | |
| Total | 99,745 | | | 27 | ±0 |
| Valid votes | 99,745 | 99.48 | +0.10 | | |
| Invalid votes | 521 | 0.52 | −0.10 | | |
| Votes cast / turnout | 100,266 | 63.56 | +0.40 | | |
| Abstentions | 57,483 | 36.44 | −0.40 | | |
| Registered voters | 157,749 | | | | |
Sources
Footnotes: ^{1} Basque Solidarity–Basque Nationalist Party results are compared to the combined totals of Basque Solidarity and Basque Nationalist Party in the 1995 election.; ^{2} Basque Citizens results are compared to Popular Unity totals in the 1995 election.

=== Errenteria ===
Population: 39,376

← Summary of the 13 June 1999 City Council of Errenteria election results →
| Parties and alliances | Popular vote | | | Seats | |
| Parties and alliances | Votes | % | ±pp | Total | +/− |
|---|---|---|---|---|---|
| Socialist Party of the Basque Country–Basque Country Left (PSE–EE (PSOE)) | 6,965 | 33.80 | +0.14 | 8 | ±0 |
| Basque Citizens (EH)^{1} | 5,946 | 28.86 | +5.64 | 6 | +1 |
| Basque Solidarity–Basque Nationalist Party (EA–PNV)^{2} | 3,777 | 18.33 | −2.17 | 4 | ±0 |
| People's Party (PP) | 2,371 | 11.51 | +1.29 | 2 | ±0 |
| United Left (IU/EB) | 1,236 | 6.00 | −4.30 | 1 | −1 |
| Blank ballots | 311 | 1.51 | −0.58 | | |
| Total | 20,606 | | | 21 | ±0 |
| Valid votes | 20,606 | 99.29 | +0.15 | | |
| Invalid votes | 147 | 0.71 | −0.15 | | |
| Votes cast / turnout | 20,753 | 60.33 | +0.64 | | |
| Abstentions | 13,644 | 39.67 | −0.64 | | |
| Registered voters | 34,397 | | | | |
Sources
Footnotes: ^{1} Basque Citizens results are compared to Popular Unity totals in the 1995 election.; ^{2} Basque Solidarity–Basque Nationalist Party results are compared to the combined totals of Basque Solidarity and Basque Nationalist Party in the 1995 election.

=== Getxo ===
Population: 82,974

← Summary of the 13 June 1999 City Council of Getxo election results →
| Parties and alliances | Popular vote | | | Seats | |
| Parties and alliances | Votes | % | ±pp | Total | +/− |
|---|---|---|---|---|---|
| Basque Nationalist Party–Basque Solidarity (PNV–EA)^{1} | 17,512 | 37.26 | −5.95 | 11 | −1 |
| People's Party (PP) | 15,568 | 33.12 | +3.15 | 9 | +1 |
| Basque Citizens (EH)^{2} | 6,159 | 13.10 | +4.00 | 3 | +1 |
| Socialist Party of the Basque Country–Basque Country Left (PSE–EE (PSOE)) | 4,636 | 9.86 | +1.39 | 2 | ±0 |
| United Left (IU/EB) | 1,947 | 4.14 | −2.89 | 0 | −1 |
| Basque Citizen Initiative (ICV/EHE) | 291 | 0.62 | New | 0 | ±0 |
| Blank ballots | 890 | 1.89 | −0.34 | | |
| Total | 47,003 | | | 25 | ±0 |
| Valid votes | 47,003 | 99.48 | +0.09 | | |
| Invalid votes | 247 | 0.52 | −0.09 | | |
| Votes cast / turnout | 47,250 | 67.88 | +2.27 | | |
| Abstentions | 22,361 | 32.12 | −2.27 | | |
| Registered voters | 69,611 | | | | |
Sources
Footnotes: ^{1} Basque Nationalist Party–Basque Solidarity results are compared to the combined totals of Basque Nationalist Party and Basque Solidarity in the 1995 election.; ^{2} Basque Citizens results are compared to Popular Unity totals in the 1995 election.

=== Irun ===
Population: 55,196

← Summary of the 13 June 1999 City Council of Irun election results →
| Parties and alliances | Popular vote | | | Seats | |
| Parties and alliances | Votes | % | ±pp | Total | +/− |
|---|---|---|---|---|---|
| Socialist Party of the Basque Country–Basque Country Left (PSE–EE (PSOE)) | 8,968 | 30.56 | +1.66 | 8 | ±0 |
| Basque Nationalist Party–Basque Solidarity (PNV–EA)^{1} | 8,774 | 29.90 | +3.53 | 8 | +2 |
| People's Party (PP) | 6,178 | 21.05 | +0.71 | 6 | +1 |
| Basque Citizens (EH)^{2} | 3,525 | 12.01 | +1.21 | 3 | ±0 |
| United Left (IU/EB) | 1,377 | 4.69 | −5.95 | 0 | −3 |
| Blank ballots | 526 | 1.79 | −0.86 | | |
| Total | 29,348 | | | 25 | ±0 |
| Valid votes | 29,348 | 99.19 | −0.11 | | |
| Invalid votes | 239 | 0.81 | +0.11 | | |
| Votes cast / turnout | 29,587 | 61.42 | +1.85 | | |
| Abstentions | 18,581 | 38.58 | −1.85 | | |
| Registered voters | 48,168 | | | | |
Sources
Footnotes: ^{1} Basque Nationalist Party–Basque Solidarity results are compared to the combined totals of Basque Nationalist Party and Basque Solidarity in the 1995 election.; ^{2} Basque Citizens results are compared to Popular Unity totals in the 1995 election.

=== Portugalete ===
Population: 53,498

← Summary of the 13 June 1999 City Council of Portugalete election results →
| Parties and alliances | Popular vote | | | Seats | |
| Parties and alliances | Votes | % | ±pp | Total | +/− |
|---|---|---|---|---|---|
| Socialist Party of the Basque Country–Basque Country Left (PSE–EE (PSOE)) | 8,268 | 29.23 | +1.92 | 8 | +1 |
| Basque Nationalist Party–Basque Solidarity (PNV–EA)^{1} | 7,819 | 27.64 | −1.37 | 7 | ±0 |
| People's Party (PP) | 5,814 | 20.55 | +3.43 | 5 | ±0 |
| Basque Citizens (EH)^{2} | 3,106 | 10.98 | +2.79 | 3 | +1 |
| United Left (IU/EB) | 2,759 | 9.75 | −6.82 | 2 | −2 |
| Blank ballots | 524 | 1.85 | +0.05 | | |
| Total | 28,290 | | | 25 | ±0 |
| Valid votes | 28,290 | 99.10 | −0.16 | | |
| Invalid votes | 258 | 0.90 | +0.16 | | |
| Votes cast / turnout | 28,548 | 61.42 | −0.68 | | |
| Abstentions | 17,932 | 38.58 | +0.68 | | |
| Registered voters | 46,480 | | | | |
Sources
Footnotes: ^{1} Basque Nationalist Party–Basque Solidarity results are compared to the combined totals of Basque Nationalist Party and Basque Solidarity in the 1995 election.; ^{2} Basque Citizens results are compared to Popular Unity totals in the 1995 election.

=== Santurtzi ===
Population: 48,962

← Summary of the 13 June 1999 City Council of Santurtzi election results →
| Parties and alliances | Popular vote | | | Seats | |
| Parties and alliances | Votes | % | ±pp | Total | +/− |
|---|---|---|---|---|---|
| Socialist Party of the Basque Country–Basque Country Left (PSE–EE (PSOE)) | 8,611 | 34.37 | +7.17 | 8 | +1 |
| Basque Nationalist Party–Basque Solidarity (PNV–EA)^{1} | 6,688 | 26.69 | −4.39 | 6 | −1 |
| People's Party (PP) | 3,824 | 15.26 | +0.92 | 3 | −1 |
| Basque Citizens (EH)^{2} | 3,647 | 14.56 | +2.67 | 3 | ±0 |
| United Left (IU/EB) | 1,919 | 7.66 | −6.25 | 1 | −3 |
| Blank ballots | 366 | 1.46 | −0.12 | | |
| Total | 25,055 | | | 21 | −4 |
| Valid votes | 25,055 | 99.34 | +0.10 | | |
| Invalid votes | 167 | 0.66 | −0.10 | | |
| Votes cast / turnout | 25,222 | 60.49 | +0.02 | | |
| Abstentions | 16,473 | 39.51 | −0.02 | | |
| Registered voters | 41,695 | | | | |
Sources
Footnotes: ^{1} Basque Nationalist Party–Basque Solidarity results are compared to the combined totals of Basque Nationalist Party and Basque Solidarity in the 1995 election.; ^{2} Basque Citizens results are compared to Popular Unity totals in the 1995 election.

=== Vitoria-Gasteiz ===
Population: 216,527

← Summary of the 13 June 1999 City Council of Vitoria-Gasteiz election results →
| Parties and alliances | Popular vote | | | Seats | |
| Parties and alliances | Votes | % | ±pp | Total | +/− |
|---|---|---|---|---|---|
| People's Party (PP) | 34,847 | 30.80 | +12.73 | 9 | +4 |
| Basque Nationalist Party–Basque Solidarity (PNV–EA)^{1} | 27,760 | 24.54 | −8.27 | 7 | −2 |
| Socialist Party of the Basque Country–Basque Country Left (PSE–EE (PSOE)) | 21,069 | 18.62 | +7.20 | 5 | +1 |
| Basque Citizens (EH)^{2} | 13,088 | 11.57 | +4.57 | 3 | +1 |
| Alavese Unity (UA) | 8,484 | 7.50 | −10.09 | 2 | −3 |
| United Left (IU/EB) | 5,808 | 5.13 | −3.19 | 1 | −1 |
| Humanist Party (PH) | 437 | 0.39 | New | 0 | ±0 |
| Blank ballots | 1,634 | 1.44 | −0.16 | | |
| Total | 113,127 | | | 27 | ±0 |
| Valid votes | 113,127 | 99.08 | −0.13 | | |
| Invalid votes | 1,048 | 0.92 | +0.13 | | |
| Votes cast / turnout | 114,175 | 61.90 | +0.06 | | |
| Abstentions | 70,277 | 38.10 | −0.06 | | |
| Registered voters | 184,452 | | | | |
Sources
Footnotes: ^{1} Basque Nationalist Party–Basque Solidarity results are compared to the combined totals of Basque Nationalist Party and Basque Solidarity in the 1995 election.; ^{2} Basque Citizens results are compared to Popular Unity totals in the 1995 election.
