= 1983 Spanish local elections in the Basque Country =

This article presents the results breakdown of the local elections held in the Basque Country on 8 May 1983. The following tables show detailed results in the autonomous community's most populous municipalities, sorted alphabetically.

== City control ==
The following table lists party control in the most populous municipalities, including provincial capitals (highlighted in bold). Gains for a party are highlighted in that party's colour.

Municipality	Population	Previous control	New control
Baracaldo	118,615	Basque Nationalist Party (EAJ/PNV)	Socialist Party of the Basque Country (PSE–PSOE)
Basauri	52,554	Basque Nationalist Party (EAJ/PNV)	Socialist Party of the Basque Country (PSE–PSOE)
**Bilbao**	433,115	Basque Nationalist Party (EAJ/PNV)	Basque Nationalist Party (EAJ/PNV)
**Donostia-San Sebastián**	172,303	Basque Nationalist Party (EAJ/PNV)	Basque Nationalist Party (EAJ/PNV)
Getxo	67,793	Basque Nationalist Party (EAJ/PNV)	Basque Nationalist Party (EAJ/PNV)
Irún	53,334	Basque Nationalist Party (EAJ/PNV)	Basque Nationalist Party (EAJ/PNV) (PSE–PSOE in 1983)
Portugalete	58,071	Socialist Party of the Basque Country (PSE–PSOE)	Socialist Party of the Basque Country (PSE–PSOE)
Rentería	46,496	Popular Unity (HB)	Socialist Party of the Basque Country (PSE–PSOE)
Santurce Antiguo	53,919	Basque Nationalist Party (EAJ/PNV)	Socialist Party of the Basque Country (PSE–PSOE)
**Vitoria-Gasteiz**	189,533	Basque Nationalist Party (EAJ/PNV)	Basque Nationalist Party (EAJ/PNV) (EA in 1986)

== Municipalities ==
=== Baracaldo ===
Population: 118,615

← Summary of the 8 May 1983 City Council of Baracaldo election results →
Parties and alliances	Popular vote			Seats	
Parties and alliances	Votes	%	±pp	Total	+/−
Socialist Party of the Basque Country (PSE–PSOE)	21,305	37.39	+16.12	11	+4
Basque Nationalist Party (EAJ/PNV)	18,005	31.60	+5.39	10	+2
Popular Unity (HB)	6,340	11.13	−12.80	3	−4
People's Coalition (AP–PDP–UL)	4,521	7.94	New	2	+2
Basque Country Left (EE)	3,092	5.43	+1.10	1	+1
Communist Party of the Basque Country (PCE/EPK)	2,246	3.94	−3.18	0	−2
United Left (Ezker Batua)	671	1.18	New	0	±0
Workers' Socialist Party (PST)	459	0.81	New	0	±0
Communist League (LC)	144	0.25	New	0	±0
Union of the Democratic Centre (UCD)	n/a	n/a	−11.42	0	−3
Blank ballots	191	0.34	+0.09		
Total	56,974			27	±0
Valid votes	56,974	98.85	−0.21		
Invalid votes	665	1.15	+0.21		
Votes cast / turnout	57,639	65.04	+3.91		
Abstentions	30,985	34.96	−3.91		
Registered voters	88,624				

=== Basauri ===
Population: 52,554

← Summary of the 8 May 1983 City Council of Basauri election results →
Parties and alliances	Popular vote			Seats	
Parties and alliances	Votes	%	±pp	Total	+/−
Socialist Party of the Basque Country (PSE–PSOE)	8,516	36.80	+11.92	10	+3
Basque Nationalist Party (EAJ/PNV)	7,551	32.63	−2.34	9	−1
Popular Unity (HB)	2,504	10.82	−6.74	3	−2
People's Coalition (AP–PDP–UL)	1,597	6.90	New	2	+2
Basque Country Left (EE)	1,508	6.52	+0.57	1	±0
Communist Party of the Basque Country (PCE/EPK)	1,045	4.52	−3.95	0	−2
Neighbourhood Labor (Auzolan)	363	1.57	New	0	±0
Blank ballots	58	0.25	−0.72		
Total	23,142			25	±0
Valid votes	23,142	98.80	+0.70		
Invalid votes	280	1.20	−0.70		
Votes cast / turnout	23,422	63.61	+9.42		
Abstentions	13,400	36.39	−9.42		
Registered voters	36,822				

=== Bilbao ===
Population: 433,115

← Summary of the 8 May 1983 City Council of Bilbao election results →
Parties and alliances	Popular vote			Seats	
Parties and alliances	Votes	%	±pp	Total	+/−
Basque Nationalist Party (EAJ/PNV)	67,211	36.38	−2.87	11	−2
Socialist Party of the Basque Country (PSE–PSOE)	51,108	27.66	+13.73	9	+5
People's Coalition (AP–PDP–UL)	26,529	14.36	New	4	+4
Popular Unity (HB)	18,483	10.00	−7.25	3	−3
Basque Country Left (EE)	13,070	7.07	+1.57	2	+1
Communist Party of the Basque Country (PCE/EPK)	2,764	1.50	−2.51	0	±0
Democratic and Social Centre (CDS)	1,731	0.94	New	0	±0
Workers' Socialist Party (PST)	1,583	0.86	New	0	±0
Independent Electors' Group (AEI)	1,518	0.82	New	0	±0
Union of the Democratic Centre (UCD)	n/a	n/a	−17.19	0	−5
Blank ballots	768	0.42	+0.15		
Total	184,765			29	±0
Valid votes	184,765	98.90	−0.20		
Invalid votes	2,053	1.10	+0.20		
Votes cast / turnout	186,818	62.86	+3.38		
Abstentions	110,367	37.14	−3.38		
Registered voters	297,185				

=== Donostia-San Sebastián ===
Population: 172,303

← Summary of the 8 May 1983 City Council of Donostia-San Sebastián election results →
Parties and alliances	Popular vote			Seats	
Parties and alliances	Votes	%	±pp	Total	+/−
Basque Nationalist Party (EAJ/PNV)	26,806	34.91	+5.10	10	+1
Socialist Party of the Basque Country (PSE–PSOE)	18,271	23.80	+8.00	7	+3
Popular Unity (HB)	13,621	17.74	−3.13	5	−1
People's Coalition (AP–PDP–UL)^{1}	9,581	12.48	+12.48	3	+3
Basque Country Left (EE)	6,530	8.50	−3.13	2	−1
Communist Party of the Basque Country (PCE/EPK)	867	1.13	−1.18	0	±0
Democratic and Social Centre (CDS)	793	1.03	New	0	±0
Independent Coordinator (UCD–DCV) (CI)	n/a	n/a	−16.46	0	−5
Blank ballots	314	0.41	+0.13		
Total	76,783			27	±0
Valid votes	76,783	99.40	+0.10		
Invalid votes	462	0.60	−0.10		
Votes cast / turnout	77,245	58.48	+3.35		
Abstentions	54,853	41.52	−3.35		
Registered voters	132,098				
Sources
Footnotes: ^{1} People's Coalition results are compared to Foral Union of the Basque Country totals in the 1979 election.

=== Getxo ===
Population: 67,793

← Summary of the 8 May 1983 City Council of Getxo election results →
Parties and alliances	Popular vote			Seats	
Parties and alliances	Votes	%	±pp	Total	+/−
Basque Nationalist Party (EAJ/PNV)	14,715	45.95	+0.70	12	−1
People's Coalition (AP–PDP–UL)	6,274	19.59	New	5	+5
Socialist Party of the Basque Country (PSE–PSOE)	4,870	15.21	+8.77	4	+3
Popular Unity (HB)	3,238	10.11	−6.62	2	−2
Basque Country Left (EE)	2,395	7.48	+3.11	2	+2
Communist Party of the Basque Country (PCE/EPK)	396	1.24	−1.33	0	±0
Union of the Democratic Centre (UCD)	n/a	n/a	−23.19	0	−7
Blank ballots	138	0.43	+0.17		
Total	32,026			25	±0
Valid votes	32,026	99.23	−0.05		
Invalid votes	247	0.77	+0.05		
Votes cast / turnout	32,273	66.88	+4.64		
Abstentions	15,982	33.12	−4.64		
Registered voters	48,255				

=== Irún ===
Population: 53,334

← Summary of the 8 May 1983 City Council of Irún election results →
Parties and alliances	Popular vote			Seats	
Parties and alliances	Votes	%	±pp	Total	+/−
Socialist Party of the Basque Country (PSE–PSOE)	9,061	37.01	+8.71	10	+1
Basque Nationalist Party (EAJ/PNV)	7,231	29.54	+2.25	8	±0
Popular Unity (HB)	2,284	9.33	−1.95	2	−1
Basque Country Left (EE)	2,024	8.27	−1.04	2	±0
People's Coalition (AP–PDP–UL)	1,980	8.09	New	2	+2
Uranzu–Independent Candidacy (Uranzu)	1,386	5.66	−5.99	1	−2
Communist Party of the Basque Country (PCE/EPK)	399	1.63	−2.70	0	±0
Blank ballots	115	0.47	−1.34		
Total	24,480			25	±0
Valid votes	24,480	98.84	+0.58		
Invalid votes	288	1.16	−0.58		
Votes cast / turnout	24,768	63.57	+4.32		
Abstentions	14,193	36.43	−4.32		
Registered voters	38,961				

=== Portugalete ===
Population: 58,071

← Summary of the 8 May 1983 City Council of Portugalete election results →
Parties and alliances	Popular vote			Seats	
Parties and alliances	Votes	%	±pp	Total	+/−
Socialist Party of the Basque Country (PSE–PSOE)	12,792	48.12	+17.29	13	+4
Basque Nationalist Party (EAJ/PNV)	5,314	19.99	−10.32	5	−3
Popular Unity (HB)	2,489	9.36	−5.09	2	−2
People's Coalition (AP–PDP–UL)	2,155	8.11	New	2	+2
Basque Country Left (EE)	1,844	6.94	+0.28	2	+1
Communist Party of the Basque Country (PCE/EPK)	1,391	5.23	−7.83	1	−2
Neighbours Association (AV)	496	1.87	New	0	±0
Blank ballots	101	0.38	−2.64		
Total	26,582			25	±0
Valid votes	26,582	98.66	+1.22		
Invalid votes	360	1.34	−1.22		
Votes cast / turnout	26,942	65.53	+12.23		
Abstentions	14,175	34.47	−12.23		
Registered voters	41,117				

=== Rentería ===
Population: 46,496

← Summary of the 8 May 1983 City Council of Rentería election results →
Parties and alliances	Popular vote			Seats	
Parties and alliances	Votes	%	±pp	Total	+/−
Socialist Party of the Basque Country (PSE–PSOE)	7,680	39.62	+13.79	9	+3
Popular Unity (HB)	4,480	23.11	−2.49	5	−1
Basque Nationalist Party (EAJ/PNV)	4,214	21.74	+0.52	4	−1
Basque Country Left (EE)	2,423	12.50	+3.01	3	+1
Communist Party of the Basque Country (PCE/EPK)	433	2.23	−4.11	0	−1
Socialist Unification of the Basque Country (ESEI)	n/a	n/a	−5.19	0	−1
Blank ballots	155	0.80	−0.05		
Total	19,385			21	±0
Valid votes	19,385	98.55	+0.68		
Invalid votes	286	1.45	−0.68		
Votes cast / turnout	19,671	61.54	+1.65		
Abstentions	12,295	38.46	−1.65		
Registered voters	31,966				

=== Santurce Antiguo ===
Population: 53,919

← Summary of the 8 May 1983 City Council of Santurce Antiguo election results →
Parties and alliances	Popular vote			Seats	
Parties and alliances	Votes	%	±pp	Total	+/−
Socialist Party of the Basque Country (PSE–PSOE)	9,075	39.05	+16.00	10	+4
Basque Nationalist Party (EAJ/PNV)	6,235	26.83	+1.71	7	±0
Popular Unity (HB)	3,403	14.64	−7.97	4	−2
Basque Country Left (EE)	1,764	7.59	+1.94	2	+1
People's Coalition (AP–PDP–UL)	1,675	7.21	New	2	+2
Communist Party of the Basque Country (PCE/EPK)	1,027	4.42	−4.64	0	−2
Union of the Democratic Centre (UCD)	n/a	n/a	−10.24	0	−3
Blank ballots	63	0.27	−0.01		
Total	23,242			25	±0
Valid votes	23,242	98.71	−0.38		
Invalid votes	303	1.29	+0.38		
Votes cast / turnout	23,545	62.11	+3.76		
Abstentions	14,366	37.89	−3.76		
Registered voters	37,911				

=== Vitoria-Gasteiz ===
Population: 189,533

← Summary of the 8 May 1983 City Council of Vitoria-Gasteiz election results →
Parties and alliances	Popular vote			Seats	
Parties and alliances	Votes	%	±pp	Total	+/−
Basque Nationalist Party (EAJ/PNV)	31,250	35.39	+3.24	11	+1
Socialist Party of the Basque Country (PSE–PSOE)	27,963	31.67	+13.22	9	+3
People's Coalition (AP–PDP–UL)	12,823	14.52	New	4	+4
Popular Unity (HB)^{1}	7,576	8.58	−1.55	2	−1
Basque Country Left (EE)	5,119	5.80	+1.04	1	+1
Democratic and Social Centre (CDS)	2,067	2.34	New	0	±0
Communist Party of the Basque Country (PCE/EPK)	1,132	1.28	−2.58	0	±0
Union of the Democratic Centre (UCD)	n/a	n/a	−25.83	0	−8
Blank ballots	370	0.42	+0.08		
Total	88,300			27	±0
Valid votes	88,300	98.74	−0.57		
Invalid votes	1,127	1.26	+0.57		
Votes cast / turnout	89,427	65.92	+1.52		
Abstentions	46,239	34.08	−1.52		
Registered voters	135,666				
Sources
Footnotes: ^{1} Popular Unity results are compared to Independents of Vitoria totals in the 1979 election.
