= 1979 Spanish local elections in the Basque Country =

This article presents the results breakdown of the local elections held in the Basque Country on 3 April 1979. The following tables show detailed results in the autonomous community's most populous municipalities, sorted alphabetically.

== City control ==
The following table lists party control in the most populous municipalities, including provincial capitals (highlighted in bold).

Municipality	Population	New control
Baracaldo	122,540	Basque Nationalist Party (EAJ/PNV)
Basauri	53,946	Basque Nationalist Party (EAJ/PNV)
**Bilbao**	450,661	Basque Nationalist Party (EAJ/PNV)
Guecho	63,926	Basque Nationalist Party (EAJ/PNV)
Irún	53,921	Basque Nationalist Party (EAJ/PNV)
Portugalete	56,501	Socialist Party of the Basque Country (PSE–PSOE)
Rentería	48,586	Popular Unity (HB)
**San Sebastián**	174,818	Basque Nationalist Party (EAJ/PNV)
Santurce Antiguo	54,470	Basque Nationalist Party (EAJ/PNV)
**Vitoria**	181,216	Basque Nationalist Party (EAJ/PNV)

== Municipalities ==
=== Baracaldo ===
Population: 122,540

Summary of the 3 April 1979 City Council of Baracaldo election results →
Parties and alliances	Popular vote			Seats	
Parties and alliances	Votes	%	±pp	Total	+/−
Basque Nationalist Party (EAJ/PNV)	14,445	26.21	n/a	**8**	n/a
Popular Unity (HB)	13,189	23.93	n/a	**7**	n/a
Socialist Party of the Basque Country (PSE–PSOE)	11,726	21.27	n/a	**7**	n/a
Union of the Democratic Centre (UCD)	6,293	11.42	n/a	**3**	n/a
Communist Party of the Basque Country (PCE/EPK)	3,927	7.12	n/a	**2**	n/a
Basque Country Left (EE)	2,388	4.33	n/a	0	n/a
Independents of Baracaldo (IB)	1,704	3.09	n/a	0	n/a
Communist Movement–Organization of Communist Left (EMK–OIC)	820	1.49	n/a	0	n/a
Party of Labour of the Basque Country (PTE)	353	0.64	n/a	0	n/a
Revolutionary Communist League (LKI/LCR)	136	0.25	n/a	0	n/a
Workers' Revolutionary Organization (ORT)	0	0.00	n/a	0	n/a
Blank ballots	138	0.25	n/a		
**Total**	**55,119**			**27**	**n/a**
Valid votes	55,119	99.06	n/a		
Invalid votes	525	0.94	n/a		
**Votes cast / turnout**	**55,644**	**61.13**	**n/a**		
Abstentions	35,387	38.87	n/a		
**Registered voters**	**91,031**				

=== Basauri ===
Population: 53,946

Summary of the 3 April 1979 City Council of Basauri election results →
Parties and alliances	Popular vote			Seats	
Parties and alliances	Votes	%	±pp	Total	+/−
Basque Nationalist Party (EAJ/PNV)	6,800	34.97	n/a	**10**	n/a
Socialist Party of the Basque Country (PSE–PSOE)	4,838	24.88	n/a	**7**	n/a
Popular Unity (HB)	3,416	17.56	n/a	**5**	n/a
Communist Party of the Basque Country (PCE/EPK)	1,647	8.47	n/a	**2**	n/a
Basque Country Left (EE)	1,158	5.95	n/a	**1**	n/a
Communist Movement–Organization of Communist Left (EMK–OIC)	948	4.87	n/a	0	n/a
Party of Labour of the Basque Country (PTE)	241	1.24	n/a	0	n/a
Revolutionary Communist League (LKI/LCR)	211	1.08	n/a	0	n/a
Blank ballots	189	0.97	n/a		
**Total**	**19,448**			**25**	**n/a**
Valid votes	19,448	98.10	n/a		
Invalid votes	376	1.90	n/a		
**Votes cast / turnout**	**19,824**	**54.19**	**n/a**		
Abstentions	16,759	45.81	n/a		
**Registered voters**	**36,583**				

=== Bilbao ===
Population: 450,661

Summary of the 3 April 1979 City Council of Bilbao election results →
Parties and alliances	Popular vote			Seats	
Parties and alliances	Votes	%	±pp	Total	+/−
Basque Nationalist Party (EAJ/PNV)	75,791	39.25	n/a	**13**	n/a
Popular Unity (HB)	33,315	17.25	n/a	**6**	n/a
Union of the Democratic Centre (UCD)	33,187	17.19	n/a	**5**	n/a
Socialist Party of the Basque Country (PSE–PSOE)	26,888	13.93	n/a	**4**	n/a
Basque Country Left (EE)	10,625	5.50	n/a	**1**	n/a
Communist Party of the Basque Country (PCE/EPK)	7,740	4.01	n/a	0	n/a
Communist Movement–Organization of Communist Left (EMK–OIC)	2,181	1.13	n/a	0	n/a
Workers' Revolutionary Organization (ORT)	1,042	0.54	n/a	0	n/a
Revolutionary Communist League (LKI/LCR)	847	0.44	n/a	0	n/a
Spanish Socialist Workers' Party (historical) (PSOEh)	651	0.34	n/a	0	n/a
Republican Left (IR)	286	0.15	n/a	0	n/a
Blank ballots	525	0.27	n/a		
**Total**	**193,078**			**29**	**n/a**
Valid votes	193,078	99.10	n/a		
Invalid votes	1,751	0.90	n/a		
**Votes cast / turnout**	**194,829**	**59.48**	**n/a**		
Abstentions	132,743	40.52	n/a		
**Registered voters**	**327,572**				

=== Guecho ===
Population: 63,926

Summary of the 3 April 1979 City Council of Guecho election results →
Parties and alliances	Popular vote			Seats	
Parties and alliances	Votes	%	±pp	Total	+/−
Basque Nationalist Party (EAJ/PNV)	11,849	45.25	n/a	**13**	n/a
Union of the Democratic Centre (UCD)	6,073	23.19	n/a	**7**	n/a
Popular Unity (HB)	4,380	16.73	n/a	**4**	n/a
Socialist Party of the Basque Country (PSE–PSOE)	1,686	6.44	n/a	**1**	n/a
Basque Country Left (EE)	1,144	4.37	n/a	0	n/a
Communist Party of the Basque Country (PCE/EPK)	673	2.57	n/a	0	n/a
Revolutionary Communist League (LKI/LCR)	192	0.73	n/a	0	n/a
Communist Movement–Organization of Communist Left (EMK–OIC)	119	0.45	n/a	0	n/a
Blank ballots	67	0.26	n/a		
**Total**	**26,183**			**25**	**n/a**
Valid votes	26,183	99.28	n/a		
Invalid votes	191	0.72	n/a		
**Votes cast / turnout**	**26,374**	**62.24**	**n/a**		
Abstentions	16,002	37.76	n/a		
**Registered voters**	**42,376**				

=== Irún ===
Population: 53,921

Summary of the 3 April 1979 City Council of Irún election results →
Parties and alliances	Popular vote			Seats	
Parties and alliances	Votes	%	±pp	Total	+/−
Socialist Party of the Basque Country (PSE–PSOE)	6,184	28.30	n/a	**9**	n/a
Basque Nationalist Party (EAJ/PNV)	5,962	27.29	n/a	**8**	n/a
Uranzu–Independent Candidacy (Uranzu)	2,545	11.65	n/a	**3**	n/a
Popular Unity (HB)	2,465	11.28	n/a	**3**	n/a
Basque Country Left (EE)	2,035	9.31	n/a	**2**	n/a
Communist Party of the Basque Country (PCE/EPK)	946	4.33	n/a	0	n/a
Workers' Revolutionary Organization (ORT)	623	2.85	n/a	0	n/a
Carlist Party (EKA/PC)	367	1.68	n/a	0	n/a
Communist Movement–Organization of Communist Left (EMK–OIC)	225	1.03	n/a	0	n/a
Revolutionary Communist League (LKI/LCR)	101	0.46	n/a	0	n/a
Party of Labour of the Basque Country (PTE)	0	0.00	n/a	0	n/a
Blank ballots	396	1.81	n/a		
**Total**	**21,849**			**25**	**n/a**
Valid votes	21,849	98.26	n/a		
Invalid votes	387	1.74	n/a		
**Votes cast / turnout**	**22,236**	**59.25**	**n/a**		
Abstentions	15,290	40.75	n/a		
**Registered voters**	**37,526**				

=== Portugalete ===
Population: 56,501

Summary of the 3 April 1979 City Council of Portugalete election results →
Parties and alliances	Popular vote			Seats	
Parties and alliances	Votes	%	±pp	Total	+/−
Socialist Party of the Basque Country (PSE–PSOE)	6,659	30.83	n/a	**9**	n/a
Basque Nationalist Party (EAJ/PNV)	6,548	30.31	n/a	**8**	n/a
Popular Unity (HB)	3,122	14.45	n/a	**4**	n/a
Communist Party of the Basque Country (PCE/EPK)	2,821	13.06	n/a	**3**	n/a
Basque Country Left (EE)	1,439	6.66	n/a	**1**	n/a
Communist Movement–Organization of Communist Left (EMK–OIC)	399	1.85	n/a	0	n/a
Party of Labour of the Basque Country (PTE)	0	0.00	n/a	0	n/a
Workers' Revolutionary Organization (ORT)	0	0.00	n/a	0	n/a
Blank ballots	653	3.02	n/a		
**Total**	**21,602**			**25**	**n/a**
Valid votes	21,602	97.44	n/a		
Invalid votes	567	2.56	n/a		
**Votes cast / turnout**	**22,169**	**53.30**	**n/a**		
Abstentions	19,421	46.70	n/a		
**Registered voters**	**41,590**				

=== Rentería ===
Population: 48,586

Summary of the 3 April 1979 City Council of Rentería election results →
Parties and alliances	Popular vote			Seats	
Parties and alliances	Votes	%	±pp	Total	+/−
Socialist Party of the Basque Country (PSE–PSOE)	4,845	25.83	n/a	**6**	n/a
Popular Unity (HB)	4,801	25.60	n/a	**6**	n/a
Basque Nationalist Party (EAJ/PNV)	3,981	21.22	n/a	**5**	n/a
Basque Country Left (EE)	1,780	9.49	n/a	**2**	n/a
Communist Party of the Basque Country (PCE/EPK)	1,190	6.34	n/a	**1**	n/a
Socialist Unification of the Basque Country (ESEI)	973	5.19	n/a	**1**	n/a
Communist Movement–Organization of Communist Left (EMK–OIC)	599	3.19	n/a	0	n/a
Workers' Revolutionary Organization (ORT)	259	1.38	n/a	0	n/a
Revolutionary Communist League (LKI/LCR)	170	0.91	n/a	0	n/a
Blank ballots	159	0.85	n/a		
**Total**	**18,757**			**21**	**n/a**
Valid votes	18,757	97.87	n/a		
Invalid votes	409	2.13	n/a		
**Votes cast / turnout**	**19,166**	**59.89**	**n/a**		
Abstentions	12,836	40.11	n/a		
**Registered voters**	**32,002**				

=== San Sebastián ===
Population: 174,818

Summary of the 3 April 1979 City Council of San Sebastián election results →
Parties and alliances	Popular vote			Seats	
Parties and alliances	Votes	%	±pp	Total	+/−
Basque Nationalist Party (EAJ/PNV)	21,539	29.81	n/a	**9**	n/a
Popular Unity (HB)	15,079	20.87	n/a	**6**	n/a
Independent Coordinator (UCD–DCV) (CI)	11,896	16.46	n/a	**5**	n/a
Socialist Party of the Basque Country (PSE–PSOE)	11,420	15.80	n/a	**4**	n/a
Basque Country Left (EE)	8,402	11.63	n/a	**3**	n/a
Communist Party of the Basque Country (PCE/EPK)	1,667	2.31	n/a	0	n/a
Communist Movement–Organization of Communist Left (EMK–OIC)	1,081	1.50	n/a	0	n/a
Workers' Revolutionary Organization (ORT)	539	0.75	n/a	0	n/a
Carlist Party (EKA/PC)	298	0.41	n/a	0	n/a
Revolutionary Communist League (LKI/LCR)	141	0.20	n/a	0	n/a
Party of Labour of the Basque Country (PTE)	3	0.00	n/a	0	n/a
Foral Union of the Basque Country (UFPV)	1	0.00	n/a	0	n/a
Blank ballots	200	0.28	n/a		
**Total**	**72,266**			**27**	**n/a**
Valid votes	72,266	99.30	n/a		
Invalid votes	507	0.70	n/a		
**Votes cast / turnout**	**72,773**	**55.13**	**n/a**		
Abstentions	59,233	44.87	n/a		
**Registered voters**	**132,006**				

=== Santurce Antiguo ===
Population: 54,470

Summary of the 3 April 1979 City Council of Santurce Antiguo election results →
Parties and alliances	Popular vote			Seats	
Parties and alliances	Votes	%	±pp	Total	+/−
Basque Nationalist Party (EAJ/PNV)	5,459	25.12	n/a	**7**	n/a
Socialist Party of the Basque Country (PSE–PSOE)	5,010	23.05	n/a	**6**	n/a
Popular Unity (HB)	4,915	22.61	n/a	**6**	n/a
Union of the Democratic Centre (UCD)	2,225	10.24	n/a	**3**	n/a
Communist Party of the Basque Country (PCE/EPK)	1,969	9.06	n/a	**2**	n/a
Basque Country Left (EE)	1,227	5.65	n/a	**1**	n/a
Communist Movement–Organization of Communist Left (EMK–OIC)	434	2.00	n/a	0	n/a
Workers' Revolutionary Organization (ORT)	279	1.28	n/a	0	n/a
Revolutionary Communist League (LKI/LCR)	155	0.71	n/a	0	n/a
Blank ballots	61	0.28	n/a		
**Total**	**21,734**			**25**	**n/a**
Valid votes	21,734	99.09	n/a		
Invalid votes	200	0.91	n/a		
**Votes cast / turnout**	**21,934**	**58.35**	**n/a**		
Abstentions	15,654	41.65	n/a		
**Registered voters**	**37,588**				

=== Vitoria ===
Population: 181,216

Summary of the 3 April 1979 City Council of Vitoria election results →
Parties and alliances	Popular vote			Seats	
Parties and alliances	Votes	%	±pp	Total	+/−
Basque Nationalist Party (EAJ/PNV)	25,357	32.15	n/a	**10**	n/a
Union of the Democratic Centre (UCD)	20,374	25.83	n/a	**8**	n/a
Socialist Party of the Basque Country (PSE–PSOE)	14,551	18.45	n/a	**6**	n/a
Independents of Vitoria (IV)	7,989	10.13	n/a	**3**	n/a
Basque Country Left (EE)	3,754	4.76	n/a	0	n/a
Communist Party of the Basque Country (PCE/EPK)	3,042	3.86	n/a	0	n/a
Independents (INDEP)	1,458	1.85	n/a	0	n/a
Workers' Revolutionary Organization (ORT)	1,020	1.29	n/a	0	n/a
Communist Movement–Organization of Communist Left (EMK–OIC)	639	0.81	n/a	0	n/a
Revolutionary Communist League (LKI/LCR)	429	0.54	n/a	0	n/a
Blank ballots	268	0.34	n/a		
**Total**	**78,881**			**27**	**n/a**
Valid votes	78,881	99.31	n/a		
Invalid votes	549	0.69	n/a		
**Votes cast / turnout**	**79,430**	**64.40**	**n/a**		
Abstentions	43,918	35.60	n/a		
**Registered voters**	**123,348**				
