= 1995 Spanish local elections in the Basque Country =

This article presents the results breakdown of the local elections held in the Basque Country on 28 May 1995. The following tables show detailed results in the autonomous community's most populous municipalities, sorted alphabetically.

== City control ==
The following table lists party control in the most populous municipalities, including provincial capitals (highlighted in bold). Gains for a party are highlighted in that party's colour.

Municipality	Population	Previous control	New control
Barakaldo	103,594	Socialist Party of the Basque Country (PSE–EE (PSOE))	Socialist Party of the Basque Country (PSE–EE (PSOE))
Basauri	50,020	Basque Nationalist Party (EAJ/PNV)	Basque Nationalist Party (EAJ/PNV)
**Bilbao**	371,876	Basque Nationalist Party (EAJ/PNV)	Basque Nationalist Party (EAJ/PNV)
**Donostia-San Sebastián**	177,929	Socialist Party of the Basque Country (PSE–EE (PSOE))	Socialist Party of the Basque Country (PSE–EE (PSOE))
Getxo	83,466	Basque Nationalist Party (EAJ/PNV)	Basque Nationalist Party (EAJ/PNV)
Irun	55,360	Socialist Party of the Basque Country (PSE–EE (PSOE))	Socialist Party of the Basque Country (PSE–EE (PSOE))
Portugalete	56,441	Socialist Party of the Basque Country (PSE–EE (PSOE))	Socialist Party of the Basque Country (PSE–EE (PSOE))
Rentería	41,418	Socialist Party of the Basque Country (PSE–EE (PSOE))	Socialist Party of the Basque Country (PSE–EE (PSOE))
Santurtzi	50,458	Socialist Party of the Basque Country (PSE–EE (PSOE))	Socialist Party of the Basque Country (PSE–EE (PSOE))
**Vitoria-Gasteiz**	214,148	Basque Nationalist Party (EAJ/PNV)	Basque Nationalist Party (EAJ/PNV)

== Municipalities ==
=== Barakaldo ===
Population: 103,594

← Summary of the 28 May 1995 City Council of Barakaldo election results →
Parties and alliances	Popular vote			Seats	
Parties and alliances	Votes	%	±pp	Total	+/−
Socialist Party of the Basque Country–Basque Country Left (PSE–EE (PSOE))^{1}	15,190	29.54	−8.80	9	−3
Basque Nationalist Party (EAJ/PNV)	11,619	22.60	−5.13	7	−1
People's Party (PP)	8,537	16.60	+8.31	5	+3
United Left (IU/EB)	6,990	13.59	+9.30	4	+4
Popular Unity (HB)	4,680	9.10	−4.54	2	−2
Basque Solidarity (EA)	2,110	4.10	−1.29	0	−1
Electors' Local Group (AVE)	1,353	2.63	New	0	±0
Platform of Independents of Spain (PIE)	132	0.26	New	0	±0
Blank ballots	807	1.57	+0.56		
Total	51,418			27	±0
Valid votes	51,418	99.36	+0.15		
Invalid votes	333	0.64	−0.15		
Votes cast / turnout	51,751	60.57	+6.20		
Abstentions	33,684	39.43	−6.20		
Registered voters	85,435				
Sources
Footnotes: ^{1} Socialist Party of the Basque Country–Basque Country Left results are compared to the combined totals of the Socialist Party of the Basque Country and Basque Country Left in the 1991 election.

=== Basauri ===
Population: 50,020

← Summary of the 28 May 1995 City Council of Basauri election results →
Parties and alliances	Popular vote			Seats	
Parties and alliances	Votes	%	±pp	Total	+/−
Basque Nationalist Party (EAJ/PNV)	7,908	33.42	−2.03	9	−2
Socialist Party of the Basque Country–Basque Country Left (PSE–EE (PSOE))^{1}	6,123	25.88	−11.43	7	−3
People's Party (PP)	3,208	13.56	+8.58	3	+3
United Left (IU/EB)	2,570	10.86	+7.91	3	+3
Popular Unity (HB)	2,540	10.73	−3.34	3	−1
Basque Solidarity (EA)	876	3.70	+0.29	0	±0
Humanist Platform (PH)	67	0.28	New	0	±0
Blank ballots	371	1.57	+0.67		
Total	23,663			25	±0
Valid votes	23,663	99.25	−0.11		
Invalid votes	178	0.75	+0.11		
Votes cast / turnout	23,841	58.69	+2.88		
Abstentions	16,781	41.31	−2.88		
Registered voters	40,622				
Sources
Footnotes: ^{1} Socialist Party of the Basque Country–Basque Country Left results are compared to the combined totals of the Socialist Party of the Basque Country and Basque Country Left in the 1991 election.

=== Bilbao ===
Population: 371,876

← Summary of the 28 May 1995 City Council of Bilbao election results →
Parties and alliances	Popular vote			Seats	
Parties and alliances	Votes	%	±pp	Total	+/−
Basque Nationalist Party (EAJ/PNV)	50,598	26.54	−8.18	9	−2
People's Party (PP)	40,457	21.22	+7.10	7	+3
Basque Citizen Initiative (ICV–Gorordo)	32,129	16.85	New	5	+5
Socialist Party of the Basque Country–Basque Country Left (PSE–EE (PSOE))^{1}	27,381	14.36	−13.56	4	−4
Popular Unity (HB)	15,451	8.10	−4.06	2	−2
United Left (IU/EB)	14,031	7.36	+5.63	2	+2
Basque Solidarity (EA)	7,535	3.95	−2.30	0	−2
Platform of Independents of Spain (PIE)	287	0.15	New	0	±0
Coalition for a New Socialist Party (NPS)^{2}	108	0.06	−0.07	0	±0
Blank ballots	2,688	1.41	+0.42		
Total	190,665			29	±0
Valid votes	190,665	99.42	+0.16		
Invalid votes	1,113	0.58	−0.16		
Votes cast / turnout	191,778	61.14	+7.53		
Abstentions	121,883	38.86	−7.53		
Registered voters	313,661				
Sources
Footnotes: ^{1} Socialist Party of the Basque Country–Basque Country Left results are compared to the combined totals of the Socialist Party of the Basque Country and Basque Country Left in the 1991 election.; ^{2} Coalition for a New Socialist Party results are compared to Alliance for the Republic totals in the 1991 election.

=== Donostia-San Sebastián ===
Population: 177,929

← Summary of the 28 May 1995 City Council of Donostia-San Sebastián election results →
Parties and alliances	Popular vote			Seats	
Parties and alliances	Votes	%	±pp	Total	+/−
People's Party (PP)	22,611	23.84	+7.52	7	+2
Socialist Party of the Basque Country–Basque Country Left (PSE–EE (PSOE))^{1}	21,677	22.85	−2.75	7	±0
Basque Solidarity (EA)	16,271	17.15	−5.21	5	−1
Popular Unity (HB)	13,579	14.32	−2.95	4	−1
Basque Nationalist Party (EAJ/PNV)	11,331	11.95	−3.29	3	−1
United Left (IU/EB)	4,975	5.25	+4.24	1	+1
We, the Women of the Plaza (Plazandreok)	2,287	2.41	New	0	±0
Public Hats (Herri-Hats)	186	0.20	New	0	±0
Blank ballots	1,931	2.04	+1.05		
Total	94,848			27	±0
Valid votes	94,848	99.38	−0.12		
Invalid votes	589	0.62	+0.12		
Votes cast / turnout	95,437	63.16	+6.99		
Abstentions	55,665	36.84	−6.99		
Registered voters	151,102				
Sources
Footnotes: ^{1} Socialist Party of the Basque Country–Basque Country Left results are compared to the combined totals of the Socialist Party of the Basque Country and Basque Country Left in the 1991 election.

=== Getxo ===
Population: 83,466

← Summary of the 28 May 1995 City Council of Getxo election results →
Parties and alliances	Popular vote			Seats	
Parties and alliances	Votes	%	±pp	Total	+/−
Basque Nationalist Party (EAJ/PNV)	15,353	35.48	−2.41	10	−1
People's Party (PP)	12,970	29.97	+9.73	8	+3
Popular Unity (HB)	3,937	9.10	−3.37	2	−1
Socialist Party of the Basque Country–Basque Country Left (PSE–EE (PSOE))^{1}	3,666	8.47	−9.39	2	−2
Basque Solidarity (EA)	3,344	7.73	−0.90	2	±0
United Left (IU/EB)	3,041	7.03	+5.88	1	+1
Blank ballots	964	2.23	+0.85		
Total	43,275			25	±0
Valid votes	43,275	99.39	+0.14		
Invalid votes	266	0.61	−0.14		
Votes cast / turnout	43,541	65.61	+8.64		
Abstentions	22,826	34.39	−8.64		
Registered voters	66,367				
Sources
Footnotes: ^{1} Socialist Party of the Basque Country–Basque Country Left results are compared to the combined totals of the Socialist Party of the Basque Country and Basque Country Left in the 1991 election.

=== Irun ===
Population: 55,360

← Summary of the 28 May 1995 City Council of Irun election results →
Parties and alliances	Popular vote			Seats	
Parties and alliances	Votes	%	±pp	Total	+/−
Socialist Party of the Basque Country–Basque Country Left (PSE–EE (PSOE))^{1}	7,793	28.90	−11.11	8	−3
People's Party (PP)	5,485	20.34	+10.46	5	+3
Basque Nationalist Party (EAJ/PNV)	4,545	16.85	−2.68	4	−1
Popular Unity (HB)	2,912	10.80	−3.25	3	−1
United Left (IU/EB)	2,870	10.64	+8.62	3	+3
Basque Solidarity (EA)	2,568	9.52	−2.00	2	−1
Democratic and Social Centre (CDS)	89	0.33	−1.59	0	±0
Blank ballots	706	2.62	+1.55		
Total	26,968			25	±0
Valid votes	26,968	99.30	−0.05		
Invalid votes	191	0.70	+0.05		
Votes cast / turnout	27,159	59.57	+5.14		
Abstentions	18,432	40.43	−5.14		
Registered voters	45,593				
Sources
Footnotes: ^{1} Socialist Party of the Basque Country–Basque Country Left results are compared to the combined totals of the Socialist Party of the Basque Country and Basque Country Left in the 1991 election.

=== Portugalete ===
Population: 56,441

← Summary of the 28 May 1995 City Council of Portugalete election results →
Parties and alliances	Popular vote			Seats	
Parties and alliances	Votes	%	±pp	Total	+/−
Socialist Party of the Basque Country–Basque Country Left (PSE–EE (PSOE))^{1}	7,839	27.31	−15.56	7	−5
Basque Nationalist Party (EAJ/PNV)	7,066	24.62	+0.79	7	+1
People's Party (PP)	4,915	17.12	+9.34	5	+3
United Left (IU/EB)	4,755	16.57	+9.32	4	+2
Popular Unity (HB)	2,352	8.19	−3.07	2	−1
Basque Solidarity (EA)	1,260	4.39	−0.30	0	±0
Blank ballots	518	1.80	+0.81		
Total	28,705			25	±0
Valid votes	28,705	99.26	+0.05		
Invalid votes	214	0.74	−0.05		
Votes cast / turnout	28,919	62.10	+6.78		
Abstentions	17,652	37.90	−6.78		
Registered voters	46,571				
Sources
Footnotes: ^{1} Socialist Party of the Basque Country–Basque Country Left results are compared to the combined totals of the Socialist Party of the Basque Country and Basque Country Left in the 1991 election.

=== Rentería ===
Population: 41,418

← Summary of the 28 May 1995 City Council of Rentería election results →
Parties and alliances	Popular vote			Seats	
Parties and alliances	Votes	%	±pp	Total	+/−
Socialist Party of the Basque Country–Basque Country Left (PSE–EE (PSOE))^{1}	6,836	33.66	−11.82	8	−3
Popular Unity (HB)	4,715	23.22	−2.99	5	−1
Basque Solidarity (EA)	2,257	11.11	+0.71	2	±0
United Left (IU/EB)	2,091	10.30	+8.23	2	+2
People's Party (PP)	2,076	10.22	+6.11	2	+2
Basque Nationalist Party (EAJ/PNV)	1,907	9.39	−0.59	2	±0
Blank ballots	424	2.09	+1.36		
Total	20,306			21	±0
Valid votes	20,306	99.14	−0.14		
Invalid votes	177	0.86	+0.14		
Votes cast / turnout	20,483	59.69	+4.26		
Abstentions	13,831	40.31	−4.26		
Registered voters	34,314				
Sources
Footnotes: ^{1} Socialist Party of the Basque Country–Basque Country Left results are compared to the combined totals of the Socialist Party of the Basque Country and Basque Country Left in the 1991 election.

=== Santurtzi ===
Population: 50,458

← Summary of the 28 May 1995 City Council of Santurtzi election results →
Parties and alliances	Popular vote			Seats	
Parties and alliances	Votes	%	±pp	Total	+/−
Socialist Party of the Basque Country–Basque Country Left (PSE–EE (PSOE))^{1}	6,776	27.20	−12.61	7	−4
Basque Nationalist Party (EAJ/PNV)	6,700	26.90	+1.49	7	±0
People's Party (PP)	3,572	14.34	+8.15	4	+3
United Left (IU/EB)	3,465	13.91	+9.04	4	+4
Popular Unity (HB)	2,962	11.89	−4.73	3	−2
Basque Solidarity (EA)	1,040	4.18	−0.96	0	−1
Blank ballots	393	1.58	+0.81		
Total	24,908			25	±0
Valid votes	24,908	99.24	−0.15		
Invalid votes	192	0.76	+0.15		
Votes cast / turnout	25,100	60.47	+6.64		
Abstentions	16,409	39.53	−6.64		
Registered voters	41,509				
Sources
Footnotes: ^{1} Socialist Party of the Basque Country–Basque Country Left results are compared to the combined totals of the Socialist Party of the Basque Country and Basque Country Left in the 1991 election.

=== Vitoria-Gasteiz ===
Population: 214,148

← Summary of the 28 May 1995 City Council of Vitoria-Gasteiz election results →
Parties and alliances	Popular vote			Seats	
Parties and alliances	Votes	%	±pp	Total	+/−
Basque Nationalist Party (EAJ/PNV)	29,978	28.16	+1.82	9	+1
People's Party (PP)	19,240	18.07	+9.78	5	+3
Alavese Unity (UA)	18,726	17.59	−4.43	5	−2
Socialist Party of the Basque Country–Basque Country Left (PSE–EE (PSOE))^{1}	15,568	14.62	−8.33	4	−2
United Left (IU/EB)	8,856	8.32	+6.96	2	+2
Popular Unity (HB)	7,448	7.00	−2.14	2	−1
Basque Solidarity (EA)	4,951	4.65	−0.68	0	−1
Blank ballots	1,704	1.60	+0.62		
Total	106,471			27	±0
Valid votes	106,471	99.21	±0.00		
Invalid votes	850	0.79	±0.00		
Votes cast / turnout	107,321	61.84	+7.99		
Abstentions	66,235	38.16	−7.99		
Registered voters	173,556				
Sources
Footnotes: ^{1} Socialist Party of the Basque Country–Basque Country Left results are compared to the combined totals of the Socialist Party of the Basque Country and Basque Country Left in the 1991 election.
