= 1987 Spanish local elections in the Basque Country =

This article presents the results breakdown of the local elections held in the Basque Country on 10 June 1987. The following tables show detailed results in the autonomous community's most populous municipalities, sorted alphabetically.

== City control ==
The following table lists party control in the most populous municipalities, including provincial capitals (highlighted in bold). Gains for a party are highlighted in that party's colour.

Municipality	Population	Previous control	New control
Barakaldo	114,094	Socialist Party of the Basque Country (PSE–PSOE)	Socialist Party of the Basque Country (PSE–PSOE)
Basauri	51,931	Socialist Party of the Basque Country (PSE–PSOE)	Socialist Party of the Basque Country (PSE–PSOE)
**Bilbao**	381,506	Basque Nationalist Party (EAJ/PNV)	Basque Nationalist Party (EAJ/PNV)
**Donostia-San Sebastián**	171,885	Basque Nationalist Party (EAJ/PNV)	Basque Solidarity (EA)
Getxo	77,856	Basque Nationalist Party (EAJ/PNV)	Basque Nationalist Party (EAJ/PNV)
Irún	54,043	Socialist Party of the Basque Country (PSE–PSOE)	Socialist Party of the Basque Country (PSE–PSOE)
Portugalete	57,794	Socialist Party of the Basque Country (PSE–PSOE)	Socialist Party of the Basque Country (PSE–PSOE)
Rentería	43,676	Socialist Party of the Basque Country (PSE–PSOE)	Socialist Party of the Basque Country (PSE–PSOE)
Santurtzi	52,502	Socialist Party of the Basque Country (PSE–PSOE)	Socialist Party of the Basque Country (PSE–PSOE)
**Vitoria-Gasteiz**	199,449	Basque Solidarity (EA)	Basque Solidarity (EA) (PNV in 1990)

== Municipalities ==
=== Barakaldo ===
Population: 114,094

← Summary of the 10 June 1987 City Council of Barakaldo election results →
Parties and alliances	Popular vote			Seats	
Parties and alliances	Votes	%	±pp	Total	+/−
Socialist Party of the Basque Country (PSE–PSOE)	15,351	27.79	−9.60	9	−2
Basque Nationalist Party (EAJ/PNV)	11,895	21.53	−10.07	6	−4
Popular Unity (HB)	9,232	16.71	+5.58	5	+2
Basque Solidarity (EA)	5,247	9.50	New	3	+3
Basque Country Left (EE)	5,160	9.34	+3.91	3	+2
Democratic and Social Centre (CDS)	3,219	5.83	New	1	+1
People's Alliance (AP)^{1}	2,620	4.74	−3.20	0	−2
United Left (IU/EB)	807	1.46	New	0	±0
Workers' Party of Spain–Communist Unity (PTE–UC)^{2}	793	1.44	−2.50	0	±0
People's Democratic Party (PDP)	160	0.29	New	0	±0
Internationalist Socialist Workers' Party (POSI)	139	0.25	New	0	±0
Humanist Platform (PH)	97	0.18	New	0	±0
Blank ballots	523	0.95	+0.61		
Total	55,243			27	±0
Valid votes	55,243	99.17	+0.32		
Invalid votes	462	0.83	−0.32		
Votes cast / turnout	55,705	63.90	−1.14		
Abstentions	31,465	36.10	+1.14		
Registered voters	87,170				
Sources
Footnotes: ^{1} People's Alliance results are compared to People's Coalition totals in the 1983 election.; ^{2} Workers' Party of Spain–Communist Unity results are compared to Communist Party of the Basque Country totals in the 1983 election.

=== Basauri ===
Population: 51,931

← Summary of the 10 June 1987 City Council of Basauri election results →
Parties and alliances	Popular vote			Seats	
Parties and alliances	Votes	%	±pp	Total	+/−
Socialist Party of the Basque Country (PSE–PSOE)	6,319	25.91	−10.89	8	−2
Basque Nationalist Party (EAJ/PNV)	5,894	24.17	−8.46	7	−2
Popular Unity (HB)	4,410	18.08	+7.26	5	+2
Basque Country Left (EE)	2,271	9.31	+2.79	3	+2
Basque Solidarity (EA)	2,057	8.43	New	2	+2
Democratic and Social Centre (CDS)	1,112	4.56	New	0	±0
People's Alliance (AP)^{1}	961	3.94	−2.96	0	−2
United Left (IU/EB)	565	2.32	New	0	±0
Workers' Party of Spain–Communist Unity (PTE–UC)^{2}	410	1.68	−2.84	0	±0
Humanist Platform (PH)	100	0.41	New	0	±0
Blank ballots	291	1.19	+0.94		
Total	24,390			25	±0
Valid votes	24,390	98.93	+0.13		
Invalid votes	265	1.07	−0.13		
Votes cast / turnout	24,655	64.67	+1.06		
Abstentions	13,468	35.33	−1.06		
Registered voters	38,123				
Sources
Footnotes: ^{1} People's Alliance results are compared to People's Coalition totals in the 1983 election.; ^{2} Workers' Party of Spain–Communist Unity results are compared to Communist Party of the Basque Country totals in the 1983 election.

=== Bilbao ===
Population: 381,506

← Summary of the 10 June 1987 City Council of Bilbao election results →
Parties and alliances	Popular vote			Seats	
Parties and alliances	Votes	%	±pp	Total	+/−
Basque Nationalist Party (EAJ/PNV)	53,157	28.02	−8.36	9	−2
Socialist Party of the Basque Country (PSE–PSOE)	39,078	20.60	−7.06	7	−2
Popular Unity (HB)	28,199	14.87	+4.87	5	+2
Basque Solidarity (EA)	20,539	10.83	New	3	+3
Basque Country Left (EE)	17,350	9.15	+2.08	3	+1
People's Alliance (AP)^{1}	16,564	8.73	−5.63	2	−2
Democratic and Social Centre (CDS)	9,398	4.95	+4.01	0	±0
United Left (IU/EB)	1,347	0.71	New	0	±0
Workers' Party of Spain–Communist Unity (PTE–UC)^{2}	897	0.47	−1.03	0	±0
People's Democratic Party (PDP)	375	0.20	New	0	±0
Humanist Platform (PH)	330	0.17	New	0	±0
Republican Popular Unity (UPR)	306	0.16	New	0	±0
Basque Social Democratic Party (PSDV)	252	0.13	New	0	±0
Internationalist Socialist Workers' Party (POSI)	219	0.12	New	0	±0
Blank ballots	1,681	0.89	+0.47		
Total	189,692			29	±0
Valid votes	189,692	99.12	+0.22		
Invalid votes	1,686	0.88	−0.22		
Votes cast / turnout	191,378	63.99	+1.13		
Abstentions	107,709	36.01	−1.13		
Registered voters	299,087				
Sources
Footnotes: ^{1} People's Alliance results are compared to People's Coalition totals in the 1983 election.; ^{2} Workers' Party of Spain–Communist Unity results are compared to Communist Party of the Basque Country totals in the 1983 election.

=== Donostia-San Sebastián ===
Population: 171,885

← Summary of the 10 June 1987 City Council of Donostia-San Sebastián election results →
Parties and alliances	Popular vote			Seats	
Parties and alliances	Votes	%	±pp	Total	+/−
Basque Solidarity (EA)	20,527	24.31	New	7	+7
Popular Unity (HB)	17,478	20.70	+2.96	6	+1
Socialist Party of the Basque Country (PSE–PSOE)	13,510	16.00	−7.80	5	−2
Basque Country Left (EE)	10,962	12.98	+4.48	4	+2
People's Alliance (AP)^{1}	10,152	12.02	−0.46	3	±0
Basque Nationalist Party (EAJ/PNV)	7,773	9.20	−25.71	2	−8
Democratic and Social Centre (CDS)	2,451	2.90	+1.87	0	±0
Workers' Party of Spain–Communist Unity (PTE–UC)^{2}	444	0.53	−0.60	0	±0
United Left (IU/EB)	244	0.29	New	0	±0
People's Democratic Party–Liberal Party (PDP–PL)	181	0.21	New	0	±0
Humanist Platform (PH)	108	0.13	New	0	±0
Zirika Coalition (CZ)	2	0.00	New	0	±0
Blank ballots	623	0.74	+0.33		
Total	84,455			27	±0
Valid votes	84,455	99.11	−0.29		
Invalid votes	761	0.89	+0.29		
Votes cast / turnout	85,216	63.75	+5.27		
Abstentions	48,466	36.25	−5.27		
Registered voters	133,682				
Sources
Footnotes: ^{1} People's Alliance results are compared to People's Coalition totals in the 1983 election.; ^{2} Workers' Party of Spain–Communist Unity results are compared to Communist Party of the Basque Country totals in the 1983 election.

=== Getxo ===
Population: 77,856

← Summary of the 10 June 1987 City Council of Getxo election results →
Parties and alliances	Popular vote			Seats	
Parties and alliances	Votes	%	±pp	Total	+/−
Basque Nationalist Party (EAJ/PNV)	11,379	31.63	−14.32	9	−3
Popular Unity (HB)	5,214	14.50	+4.39	4	+2
Basque Solidarity (EA)	5,190	14.43	New	4	+4
People's Alliance (AP)^{1}	5,125	14.25	−5.34	4	−1
Basque Country Left (EE)	3,720	10.34	+2.86	2	±0
Socialist Party of the Basque Country (PSE–PSOE)	3,465	9.63	−5.58	2	−2
Democratic and Social Centre (CDS)	1,205	3.35	New	0	±0
People's Democratic Party (PDP)	152	0.42	New	0	±0
Workers' Party of Spain–Communist Unity (PTE–UC)^{2}	145	0.40	−0.84	0	±0
Humanist Platform (PH)	113	0.31	New	0	±0
Blank ballots	263	0.73	+0.30		
Total	35,971			25	±0
Valid votes	35,971	99.43	+0.20		
Invalid votes	208	0.57	−0.20		
Votes cast / turnout	36,179	64.24	−2.64		
Abstentions	20,143	35.76	+2.64		
Registered voters	56,322				
Sources
Footnotes: ^{1} People's Alliance results are compared to People's Coalition totals in the 1983 election.; ^{2} Workers' Party of Spain–Communist Unity results are compared to Communist Party of the Basque Country totals in the 1983 election.

=== Irún ===
Population: 54,043

← Summary of the 10 June 1987 City Council of Irún election results →
Parties and alliances	Popular vote			Seats	
Parties and alliances	Votes	%	±pp	Total	+/−
Socialist Party of the Basque Country (PSE–PSOE)	8,148	32.39	−4.62	9	−1
Basque Solidarity (EA)	4,314	17.15	New	5	+5
Popular Unity (HB)	3,904	15.52	+6.19	4	+2
Basque Country Left (EE)	2,801	11.13	+2.86	3	+1
Basque Nationalist Party (EAJ/PNV)	2,315	9.20	−20.34	2	−6
People's Alliance (AP)^{1}	1,469	5.84	−2.25	1	−1
Democratic and Social Centre (CDS)	1,423	5.66	New	1	+1
Workers' Party of Spain–Communist Unity (PTE–UC)^{2}	260	1.03	−0.60	0	±0
United Left (IU/EB)	160	0.64	New	0	±0
Republican Popular Unity (UPR)	57	0.23	New	0	±0
Humanist Platform (PH)	54	0.21	New	0	±0
Uranzu–Independent Candidacy (Uranzu)	n/a	n/a	−5.66	0	−1
Blank ballots	251	1.00	+0.53		
Total	25,156			25	±0
Valid votes	25,156	98.99	+0.15		
Invalid votes	257	1.01	−0.15		
Votes cast / turnout	25,413	63.51	−0.06		
Abstentions	14,604	36.49	+0.06		
Registered voters	40,017				
Sources
Footnotes: ^{1} People's Alliance results are compared to People's Coalition totals in the 1983 election.; ^{2} Workers' Party of Spain–Communist Unity results are compared to Communist Party of the Basque Country totals in the 1983 election.

=== Portugalete ===
Population: 57,794

← Summary of the 10 June 1987 City Council of Portugalete election results →
Parties and alliances	Popular vote			Seats	
Parties and alliances	Votes	%	±pp	Total	+/−
Socialist Party of the Basque Country (PSE–PSOE)	8,779	31.94	−16.18	10	−3
Basque Nationalist Party (EAJ/PNV)	4,166	15.16	−4.83	5	±0
Popular Unity (HB)	3,906	14.21	+4.85	4	+2
Basque Country Left (EE)	3,235	11.77	+4.83	3	+1
Basque Solidarity (EA)	1,934	7.04	New	2	+2
Democratic and Social Centre (CDS)	1,435	5.22	New	1	+1
People's Alliance (AP)^{1}	1,304	4.74	−3.37	0	−2
Portugalete Neighbours Association (AVP)	1,181	4.30	+2.43	0	±0
United Left (IU/EB)	712	2.59	New	0	±0
Workers' Party of Spain–Communist Unity (PTE–UC)^{2}	558	2.03	−3.20	0	−1
Humanist Platform (PH)	59	0.21	New	0	±0
Blank ballots	215	0.78	+0.40		
Total	27,484			25	±0
Valid votes	27,484	99.42	+0.76		
Invalid votes	161	0.58	−0.76		
Votes cast / turnout	27,645	63.76	−1.77		
Abstentions	15,713	36.24	+1.77		
Registered voters	43,358				
Sources
Footnotes: ^{1} People's Alliance results are compared to People's Coalition totals in the 1983 election.; ^{2} Workers' Party of Spain–Communist Unity results are compared to Communist Party of the Basque Country totals in the 1983 election.

=== Rentería ===
Population: 43,676

← Summary of the 10 June 1987 City Council of Rentería election results →
Parties and alliances	Popular vote			Seats	
Parties and alliances	Votes	%	±pp	Total	+/−
Socialist Party of the Basque Country (PSE–PSOE)	6,532	31.56	−8.06	7	−2
Popular Unity (HB)	5,754	27.80	+4.69	7	+2
Basque Solidarity (EA)	3,256	15.73	New	3	+3
Basque Country Left (EE)	2,664	12.87	+0.37	3	±0
Basque Nationalist Party (EAJ/PNV)	1,214	5.87	−15.87	1	−3
People's Alliance (AP)	710	3.43	New	0	±0
United Left (IU/EB)	321	1.55	New	0	±0
Humanist Platform (PH)	44	0.21	New	0	±0
Blank ballots	204	0.99	+0.19		
Total	20,699			21	±0
Valid votes	20,699	98.99	+0.44		
Invalid votes	211	1.01	−0.44		
Votes cast / turnout	20,910	65.93	+4.39		
Abstentions	10,806	34.07	−4.39		
Registered voters	31,716				

=== Santurtzi ===
Population: 52,502

← Summary of the 10 June 1987 City Council of Santurtzi election results →
Parties and alliances	Popular vote			Seats	
Parties and alliances	Votes	%	±pp	Total	+/−
Socialist Party of the Basque Country (PSE–PSOE)	7,398	30.55	−8.50	9	−1
Popular Unity (HB)	4,719	19.49	+4.85	6	+2
Basque Nationalist Party (EAJ/PNV)	3,923	16.20	−10.63	4	−3
Basque Solidarity (EA)	2,792	11.53	New	3	+3
Basque Country Left (EE)	2,371	9.79	+2.20	3	+1
People's Alliance (AP)^{1}	1,064	4.39	−2.82	0	−2
Democratic and Social Centre (CDS)	787	3.25	New	0	±0
United Left (IU/EB)	555	2.29	New	0	±0
Workers' Party of Spain–Communist Unity (PTE–UC)^{2}	262	1.08	−3.34	0	±0
People's Democratic Party (PDP)	89	0.37	New	0	±0
Humanist Platform (PH)	46	0.19	New	0	±0
Blank ballots	208	0.86	+0.59		
Total	24,214			25	±0
Valid votes	24,214	99.07	+0.36		
Invalid votes	228	0.93	−0.36		
Votes cast / turnout	24,442	62.99	+0.88		
Abstentions	14,358	37.01	−0.88		
Registered voters	38,800				
Sources
Footnotes: ^{1} People's Alliance results are compared to People's Coalition totals in the 1983 election.; ^{2} Workers' Party of Spain–Communist Unity results are compared to Communist Party of the Basque Country totals in the 1983 election.

=== Vitoria-Gasteiz ===
Population: 199,449

← Summary of the 10 June 1987 City Council of Vitoria-Gasteiz election results →
Parties and alliances	Popular vote			Seats	
Parties and alliances	Votes	%	±pp	Total	+/−
Basque Solidarity (EA)	31,238	32.53	New	10	+10
Socialist Party of the Basque Country (PSE–PSOE)	19,213	20.01	−11.66	6	−3
Popular Unity (HB)	10,790	11.24	+2.66	3	+1
Basque Nationalist Party (EAJ/PNV)	8,705	9.07	−26.32	2	−9
Democratic and Social Centre (CDS)	8,300	8.64	+6.30	2	+2
People's Alliance (AP)^{1}	8,072	8.41	−6.11	2	−2
Basque Country Left (EE)	6,299	6.56	+0.76	2	+1
Left Socialist Coordinator (CSI)	745	0.78	New	0	±0
People's Democratic Party (PDP)	617	0.64	New	0	±0
United Left (IU/EB)	446	0.46	New	0	±0
Workers' Party of Spain–Communist Unity (PTE–UC)^{2}	437	0.46	−0.82	0	±0
Humanist Platform (PH)	183	0.19	New	0	±0
Blank ballots	973	1.01	+0.59		
Total	96,018			27	±0
Valid votes	96,018	99.09	+0.35		
Invalid votes	877	0.91	−0.35		
Votes cast / turnout	96,895	66.78	+0.86		
Abstentions	48,211	33.22	−0.86		
Registered voters	145,106				
Sources
Footnotes: ^{1} People's Alliance results are compared to People's Coalition totals in the 1983 election.; ^{2} Workers' Party of Spain–Communist Unity results are compared to Communist Party of the Basque Country totals in the 1983 election.
