= Timeline of San Sebastián =

The following is a timeline of the history of the city of San Sebastián, Spain.

== Prior to 20th century ==
- 1682 – Consulate of the Sea established.
- 1813
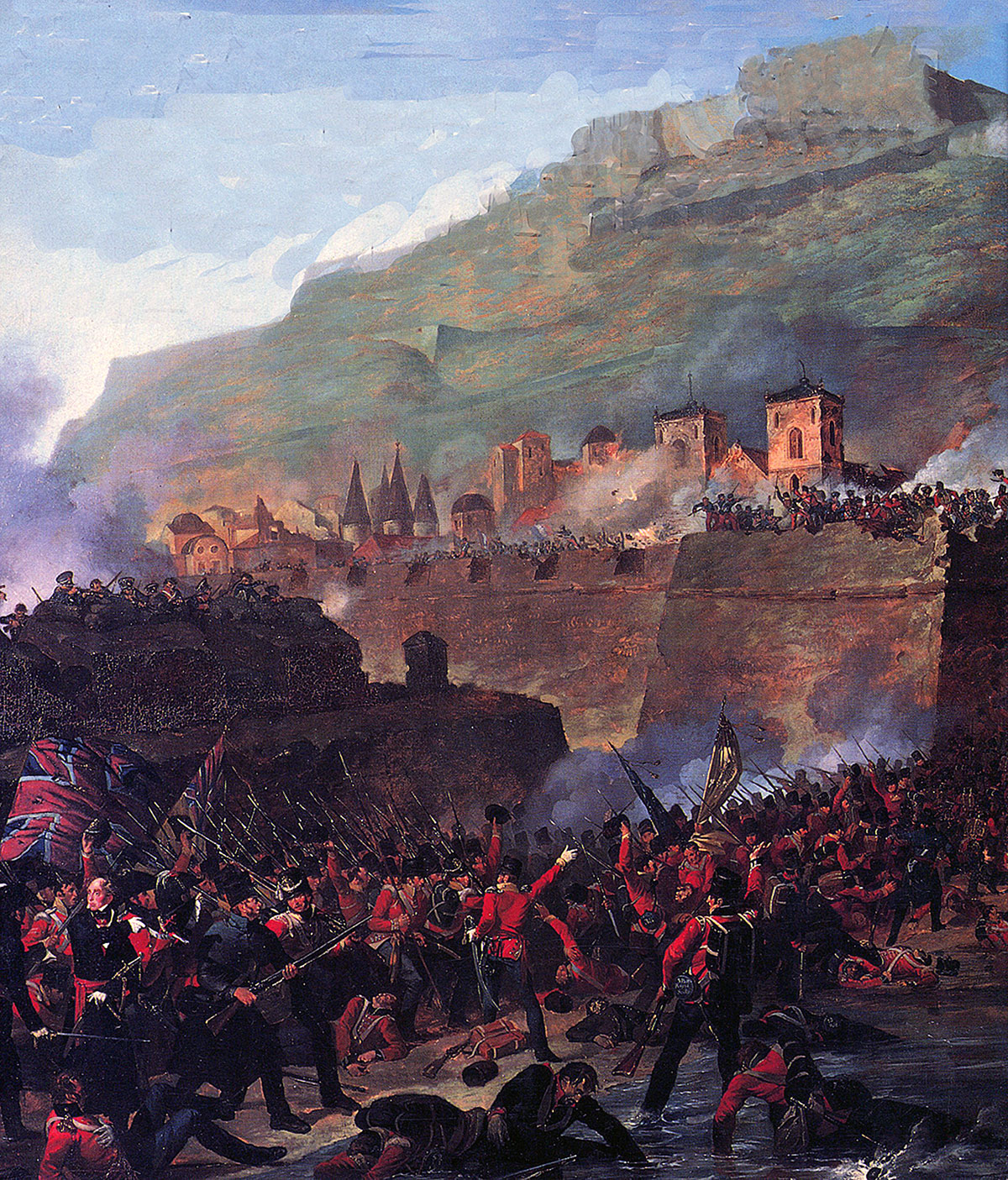
  Storming of Saint Sebastian, Denis Dighton, 1813
  - Siege of San Sebastián.
  - 31 August: Fire destroys large part of city.
- 1817 – Konstituzio plaza constructed.
- 1832 – Udaletxe Zaharra (Donostia) (town hall) built.
- 1842 – Population: 10,036.
- 1843 – Teatro Principal (San Sebastián) (theatre) opens.
- 1863 – City walls dismantled.
- 1872 – Diario de San Sebastián newspaper begins publication.
- 1874 – San Sebastián public library established.
- 1879 – Academia Municipal de Música founded.
- 1880
  - Escuela de Artes y Oficios de San Sebastián (school) opens.
  - Euskal-Erria magazine begins publication.
  - Parque Alderdi Eder (garden) established.
- 1886
  - Compañía del Tranvía de San Sebastián established.
  - Spanish royal court begins summering at San Sebastian.
- 1887 – Gran Casino de San Sebastián built.
- 1893 – Miramar Palace built.
- 1897
  - Cathedral of the Good Shepherd consecrated.
  - Orfeón Donostiarra (musical group) formed.
  - La Constancia newspaper begins publication.
  - Iglesia de San Ignacio de Loyola (San Sebastián) (church) built in the Gros (San Sebastián) barrio.
- 1900 – Population: 37,812.

== 20th century ==
- 1902 – San Telmo Museoa (museum) established.
- 1903 – El Pueblo Vasco newspaper begins publication.
- 1905 – María Cristina Bridge built.
- 1909 – Real Sociedad football club formed.
- 1912
  - Teatro Victoria Eugenia (theatre) opens.
  - Hotel María Cristina built.
  - Igueldo funicular begins operating.
  - La Perla beach resort established.
- 1913 – Atotxa Stadium opens.
- 1916 – Hipódromo Municipal de San Sebastián (racecourse) built.
- 1920
  - Los Justicieros anarchist group active.
  - Population: 61,774.
- 1926 – Cristina Enea Park established.
- 1929 – San Sebastián Yacht Club building constructed.
- 1930 – 17 August: Pact of San Sebastián signed.
- 1934 – El Diario Vasco newspaper begins publication.
- 1936 – July: Siege of Cuartel de Loyola at start of the Spanish Civil War.
- 1938 – Gros fronton (sport venue) opens.
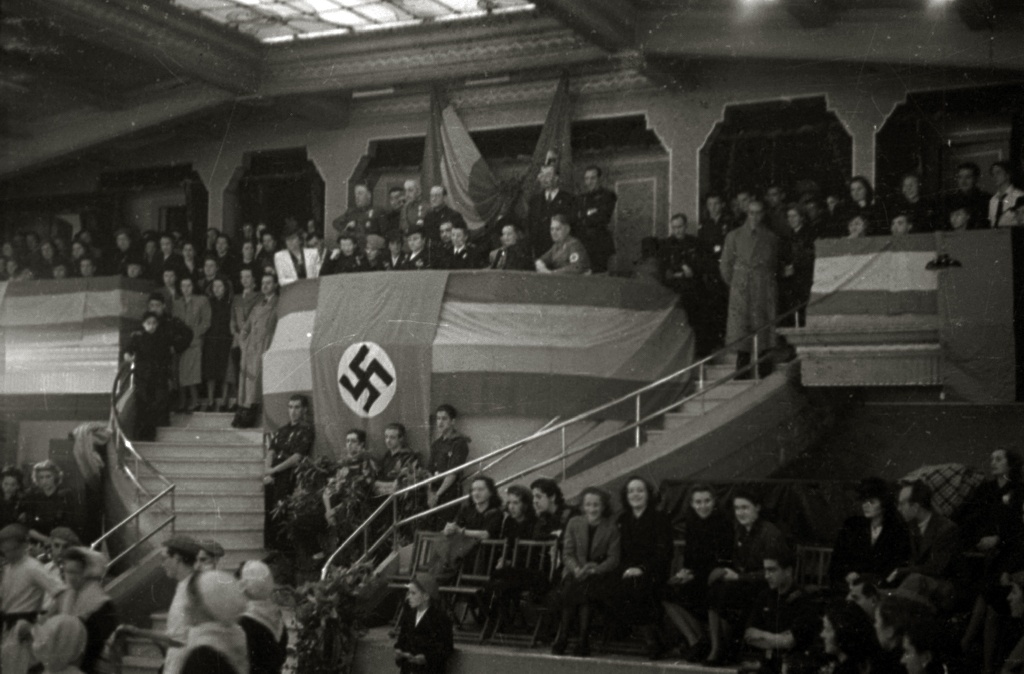
  San Sebastián in 1941
- 1940 – Population: 103,979.
- 1949 – Roman Catholic Diocese of San Sebastián established.
- 1953 – San Sebastián International Film Festival begins.
- 1960 – Population: 135,149.
- 1965 – Velódromo de Anoeta opens.
- 1970 – Population: 165,829.
- 1990 – Donostia Kultura established.
- 1993 – Anoeta Stadium opens.
- 1999 – Kursaal Congress Centre and Auditorium opens.

== 21st century ==
- 2001 – Musikene music school founded. Sonata Arctica release their song San Sebastian on the album Silence.
- 2003 – City divided into 17 barrios.^{(es)}
- 2008 – Population: 183,308 city; 405,099 metro.
- 2011
  - Iglesia de Iesu (church) built in Riberas de Loyola barrio.
  - Basque Culinary Center campus opens.
  - Population: 185,512.
- 2015 – Eneko Goia elected mayor.^{(es)}
- 2018 – 10 June: Pro-independence, 202 kilometer human chain formed between cities of San Sebastián, Bilbao, and Vitoria-Gasteiz.

== See also ==
- San Sebastián history
- History of San Sebastián

Other cities in the autonomous community of the Basque Country:^{(es)}

- Timeline of Bilbao

== Bibliography ==
- Richard Ford (1890), "San Sebastian", Handbook for Travellers in Spain, vol. 1 (7th ed.), London: J. Murray, p. 6
- "San Sebastian" . Encyclopædia Britannica. Vol. 24 (11th ed.). 1910. p. 155.
- "San Sebastian", Spain and Portugal (4th ed.), Leipzig: Karl Baedeker, 1913, p. 9, hdl:2027/uc2.ark:/13960/t5q81nw29 – via HathiTrust
- Miguel Artola, ed. (2001). Historia de Donostia-San Sebastián (in Spanish) (2nd ed.). Ayuntamiento de San Sebastian. ISBN 84-89569-49-5.
- David Gilmour (2012). "San Sebastian". Cities of Spain. Random House. ISBN 978-1-4481-3833-3.
