= Ane Legarreta =

Basque conductor (born 1994)

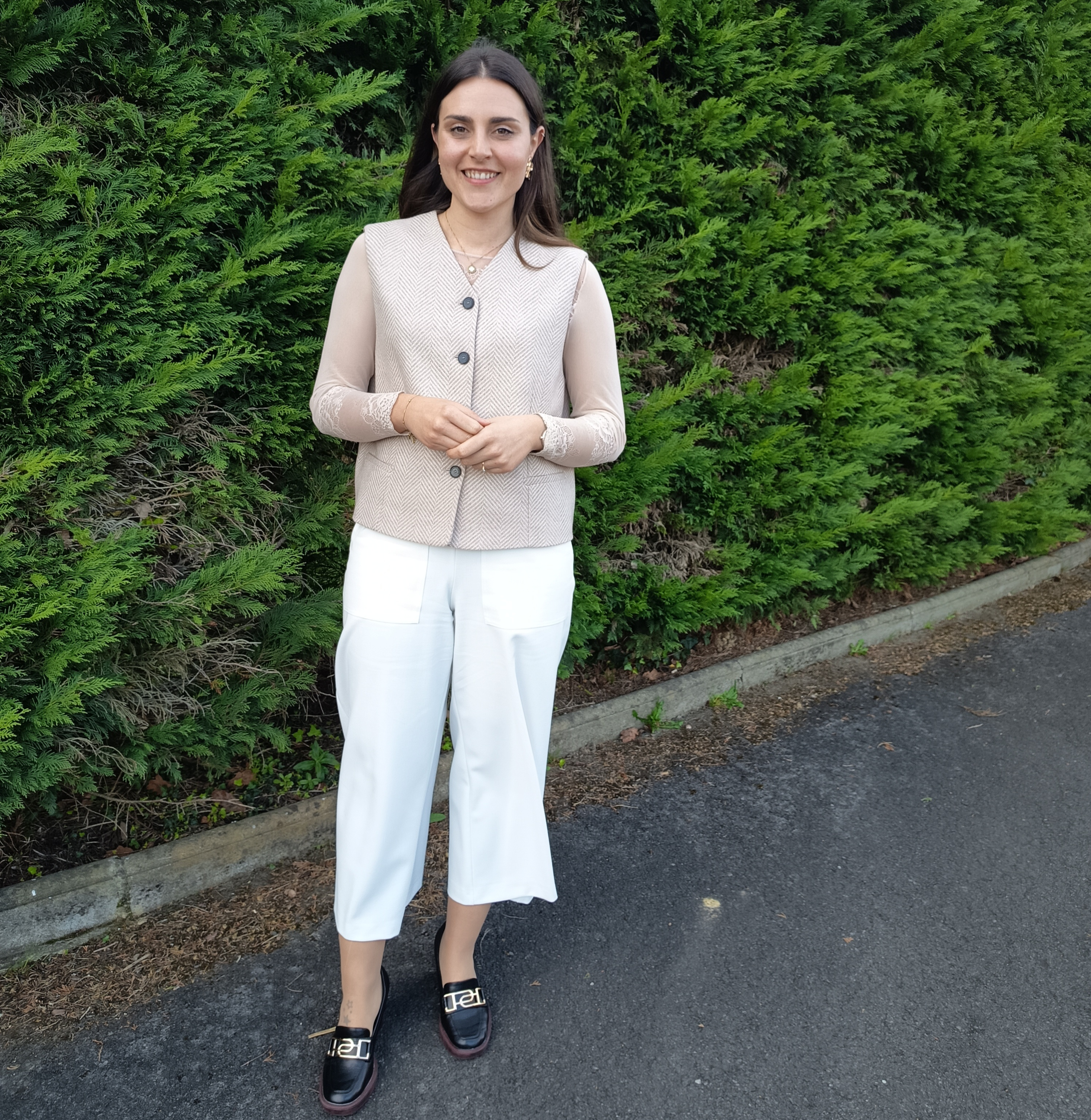
- Ane Legarreta
- Born: Ane Legarreta Méndez; 2 April 1994 (age 32); Galdakao
- Citizenship: Spain
- Education: Musikene
- Occupation: Conductor
- Organizations: Network of Women Artists and Creators
- Website: anelegarreta.com

Ane Legarreta Méndez (born on 2 April 1994 in Galdakao) is a Basque conductor.

In 2021 she founded the Network of Women Artists and Creators (ESAS), an orchestra composed entirely of women.

In 2025, she became the first woman to lead the Portugalete Wind Orchestra as its director.

== Early life and education ==
Her first steps began at the Máximo Moreno Galdakao music school at the age of 5. She studied piano and harp at the Juan Crisóstomo de Arriaga Conservatory in Bilbao.

She studied orchestral conducting at the Musikene Higher Music Conservatory in Donostia-San Sebastián with Arturo Tamayo. She obtained a master's degree in symphonic, instrumental and vocal conducting in Madrid. She studied conducting contemporary chamber music in Lugano, Switzerland. She studied opera conducting in the Emilia-Romagna region, Italy.

== Career ==
She began conducting the Galdakao Band at the age of 19, becoming the first woman to do so. In 2018, she confessed to the journalist Etxahun Gonzalez, "Historically, men have given these orders and it seems that women, and even young people, have to make a double effort to show that we are capable."

When she finished her music studies in 2018, as usual, she took her final exam conducting the Bilbao Symphony Orchestra at the Euskalduna Palace, achieving excellent results. She has been a guest conductor with the Basque Country Symphony Orchestra, the Navarre Symphony Orchestra and the Tenerife Symphony Orchestra, among others.

As he stated in an interview with Argia magazine in February 2021, "Looking to the future, my dream is to create an orchestra." In 2021 she founded the Network of Women Artists and Creators (ESAS), an orchestra composed entirely of women. In 2023, ESAS is a 35-woman orchestra, lacking trumpets, trombones and tubas. It gave its first major concert at the Euskalduna Palace in Bilbao in January. It has had chamber performances in Barcelona, Madrid and Mallorca.

Legarreta is a collaborator with Euskadi Irratia (EITB), where she talks about the daily life of classical music.

In 2023, Legarreta was chosen to give the opening speech at the 2023 Galdakao patron saint festivities.

In 2025, Legarreta directed the experimental opera Exodus, a theatrical and musical project that premiered at the Arriaga Theatre in Bilbao. The opera was composed by Jon Sáenz, with a libretto by Hegoa Álvarez and starring the actor Lander Otaola.

== See also ==
- Bilbao Orkestra Sinfonikoa
- Arturo Tamayo
