= Jose Etxenagusia =

Spanish painter

- Jose Etxenagusia Errazkin
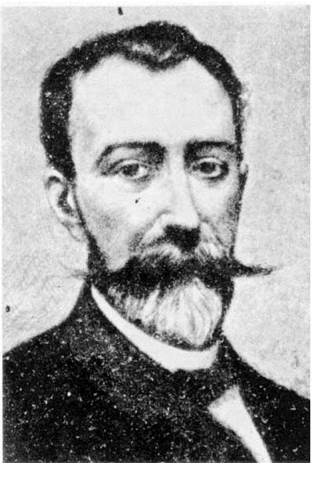
- Jose Etxenagusia, (date unknown)
- Born: 1 February 1844; Hondarribia, Spain
- Died: 31 January 1912 (aged 67); Rome
- Education: Royal Seminary, Bergara, Studio of José Villegas Cordero, Rome
- Known for: Painter, teacher
- Movement: genre

Jose Etxenagusia Errazkin or, in Spanish, José Echenagusía Errazquin (1 February 1844 – 31 January 1912) was a Basque genre painter. He signed his works "Echena".

== Biography ==
He was born in Hondarribia, into a well-to-do bourgeois family. After displaying an early talent for art, he began his studies at the Royal Seminary in Bergara, aged only fourteen, which was unusual for someone from a small provincial town.

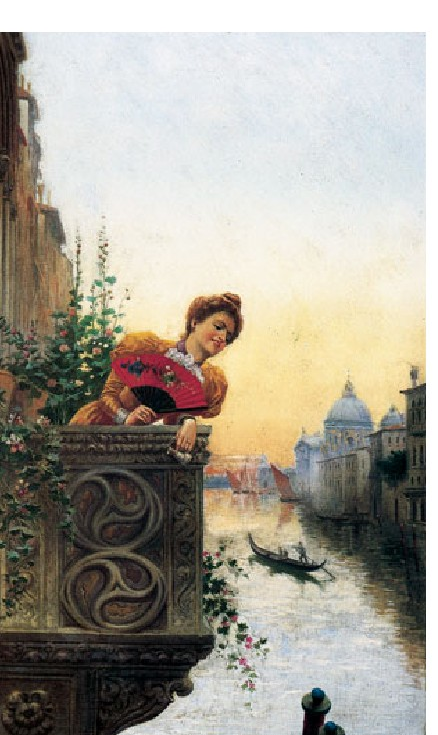
Venetian Lady on a Balcony

Four years later, he obtained a position with the city government of Burgos, but was unhappy and moved to Bilbao to pursue his artistic interests. There, he was able to find work with the Tudela to Bilbao Railway to help support his studies. The outbreak of the Third Carlist War in 1872 interrupted his plans and, after briefly taking part in the defense of the city, moved to Bayonne to pick up where he had left off. In 1875, an aunt of his died from wounds she had suffered in the war and left him a substantial inheritance, which enabled him to travel to Italy.

After a visit to Venice he went to Rome, where he attended several schools and associated with other Spanish artists who were studying there. One of them, José Villegas Cordero, had difficulty pronouncing Etxenagusia's Basque name, calling him "Echena...and I don't know what". The shortened name stuck and Etxenagusia began using it as his signature. He was strongly influenced by the works of Giambattista Tiepolo and began producing historical scenes of soldiers and courtiers. Later, he came under the influence of the Nazarene movement.

He returned home in 1882 and shortly found work, designing heraldry and costumes for the Holy Week procession in addition to creating a mural of Christ at Calvary for the Church of Santa Maria. One of his most ambitious works depicted Christ at Golgotha (now lost). It was awarded a medal at the National Exhibition of Fine Arts in 1884, reproduced by Goupil & cie and widely distributed. Later, he provided murals for the Biscay Foral Delegation Palace and the Chavarri Palace and made a successful tour of England.

By the early 1890s, he was back in Rome, where he opened an art gallery and became a teacher at the Academia Chigi. He remained there for the rest of his life, with occasional stays in Florence and Venice. He died of malarial fever in Rome. After his death, a major retrospective of his works was held in Donostia.

== Selected paintings ==
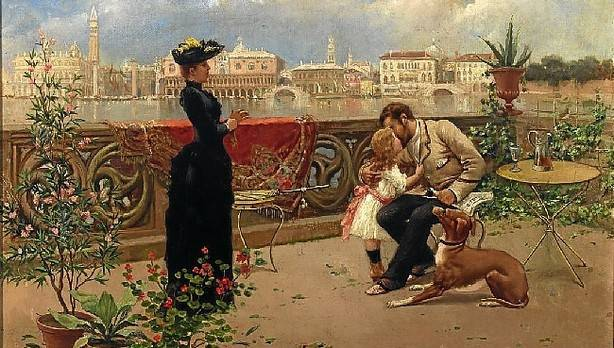
Venetian Family

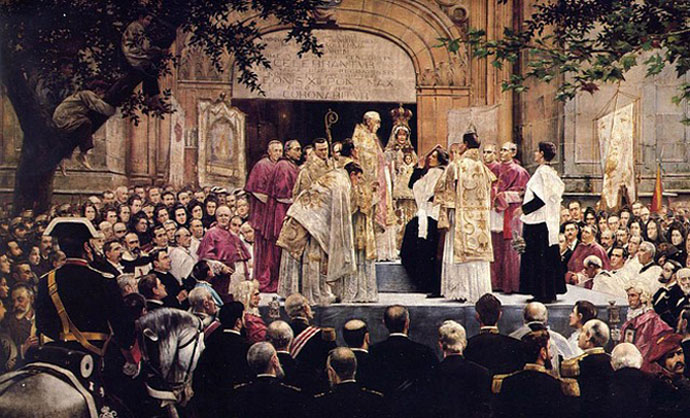
The Coronation of
Our Lady of Begoña

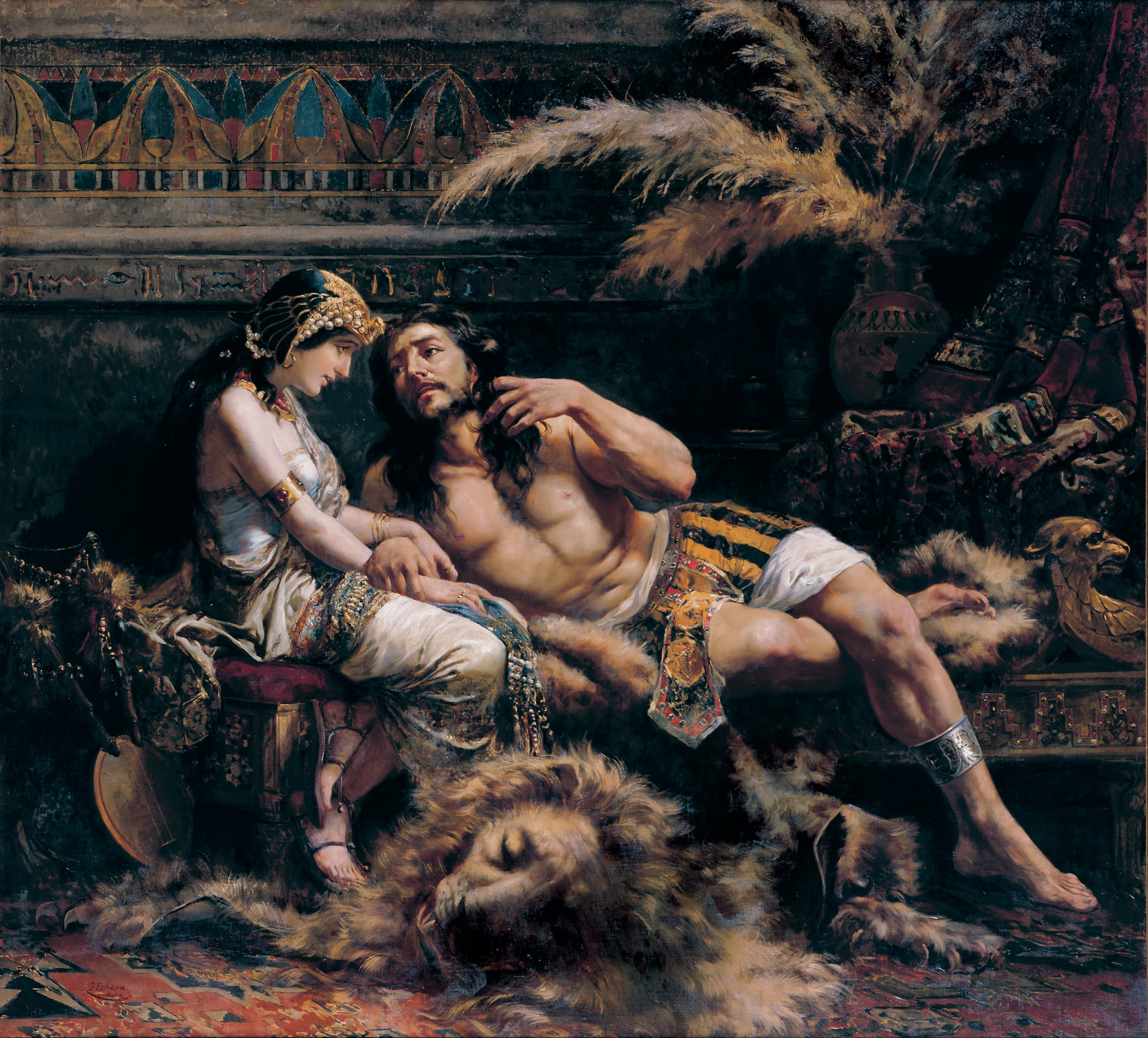
Samson and Delilah

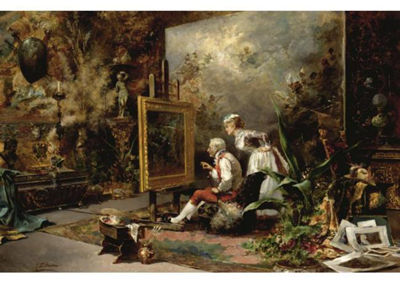
The Artist's Studio
