= Timeline of Bilbao =

Important events in the history of the city of Bilbao, Spain

The following is a timeline of the history of the city of Bilbao in the Biscay province of Spain.

== Prior to 19th century ==
- 1300 – Bilbao founded by Diego López V de Haro.
- 1397 – Santiago Cathedral built (approximate date).
- 1510 – Church of San Antón built.
- 1511
  - Consulado established.
  - Basilica of Begoña construction begins.
- 1795 – July: Town occupied by French forces.

== 19th century ==
- 1804 – Zamacolada conflict.
- 1808 – French occupation begins.
- 1813 – French occupation ends.
- 1833 – Biscay Province established.
- 1836 – December: Battle of Luchana.
- 1845 – Arenal Bridge constructed.
- 1846 – Fabrica de Nuestra Senora de la Merced (steel mill) in business near town.
- 1855 – Fabrica de Nuestra Senora del Carmen in business.
- 1857 – Bank established.
- 1859 – British Protestant Cemetery established.
- 1863 – Tudela-Bilbao railway begins operating.
- 1870 – Population: 17,649.
- 1874 – February–May: Town besieged by Carlist forces.
- 1877 – San Antón Bridge built.
- 1882 – Bilbao-Atxuri Station built.
- 1886
  - Orfeón Bilbaíno (choir) founded.
  - University of Deusto opened.
- 1887 – Population: 50,772.
- 1890
  - Stock Exchange founded.
  - Teatro Arriaga built.
  - May: Ironworkers strike.
- 1892 – Bilbao City Hall built.
- 1893 – Vizcaya Bridge built.
- 1894 – Chavarri Palace built.
- 1895 – Gaceta del Norte newspaper begins publication.
- 1896 – Dry dock built.
- 1897 – Population: 74,076.
- 1898 – Athletic Club (football club) formed.
- 1900
  - Biscay Foral Delegation Palace built.
  - Population: 83,306.

== 20th century ==
- 1905 – A second dry dock built.
- 1906 – August: General strike.
- 1907 – Doña Casilda Iturrizar park created.
- 1913
  - San Mamés Stadium opens.
  - Euzkadi newspaper begins publication.
- 1914 – Bilbao Fine Arts Museum established.
- 1922 – Bilbao Orkestra Sinfonikoa founded.
- 1924 – Museum of Modern Art established.
- 1937 – 19 June: "Nationalists capture Bilbao."
- 1940 – Population: 195,186.
- 1950 – Bilbao Airport in operation.
- 1960 – Population: 297,942.
- 1968 – University of Bilbao established.
- 1970 – Population: 410,490.
- 1978 – Great Week of Bilbao begins.
- 1979 – City becomes part of the Basque Country (autonomous community) of Spain.
- 1980 – University of the Basque Country established.
- 1983 – In region near Bilbao, construction of Lemoniz Nuclear Power Plant ceases.
- 1991 – Population: 372,054.
- 1995 – Bilbao Metro begins operating.
- 1997 – Guggenheim Museum Bilbao and Zubizuri footbridge open.
- 1999
  - Banco Bilbao Vizcaya Argentaria established.
  - Euskalduna Conference Centre and Concert Hall opens.
  - Iñaki Azkuna becomes mayor.

== 21st century ==
- 2004 – Bilbao Exhibition Centre opens in Barakaldo.
- 2006 – Bilbao Live Festival begins.
- 2010 – Alhóndiga Bilbao opens.
- 2011 – Iberdrola Tower built.
- 2013 – Population: 351,629.
- 2014 – 11 January: Pro-ETA demonstration.
- 2018 – 10 June: Pro-independence, 202 kilometer human chain formed between cities of Bilbao, San Sebastián, and Vitoria-Gasteiz.

== See also ==
- History of Bilbao
- List of mayors of Bilbao
- History of Bilbao

Other cities in the autonomous community of the Basque Country:^{(es)}

- Timeline of San Sebastián

== Bibliography ==
- David Brewster, ed. (1830). "Bilbao". Edinburgh Encyclopædia. Edinburgh: William Blackwood.
- George Henry Townsend (1867), "Bilbao", A Manual of Dates (2nd ed.), London: Frederick Warne & Co.
- John Lomas, ed. (1889), "Bilbao", O'Shea's Guide to Spain and Portugal (8th ed.), Edinburgh: Adam & Charles Black
- Richard Ford (1890), "Bilbao", Handbook for Travellers in Spain (7th ed.), London: J. Murray, hdl:2027/uva.x004203850
- "Bilbao", Spain and Portugal: Handbook for Travellers (3rd ed.), Leipsic: Karl Baedeker, 1908, OCLC 1581249
- "Bilbao" . Encyclopædia Britannica. Vol. 3 (11th ed.). 1910. pp. 930–931.
- Benjamin Vincent (1910), "Bilbao", Haydn's Dictionary of Dates (25th ed.), London: Ward, Lock & Co.
- "Bilbao". Satchel Guide to Spain and Portugal. Boston: Houghton Mifflin. 1930. hdl:2027/mdp.39015024367917.
- Patrick O'Flanagan (2008). "Bilbao". Port Cities of Atlantic Iberia, c.1500-1900. Ashgate. ISBN 978-0-7546-6109-2.
