= Jon Insausti =

Spanish politician (born 1989)

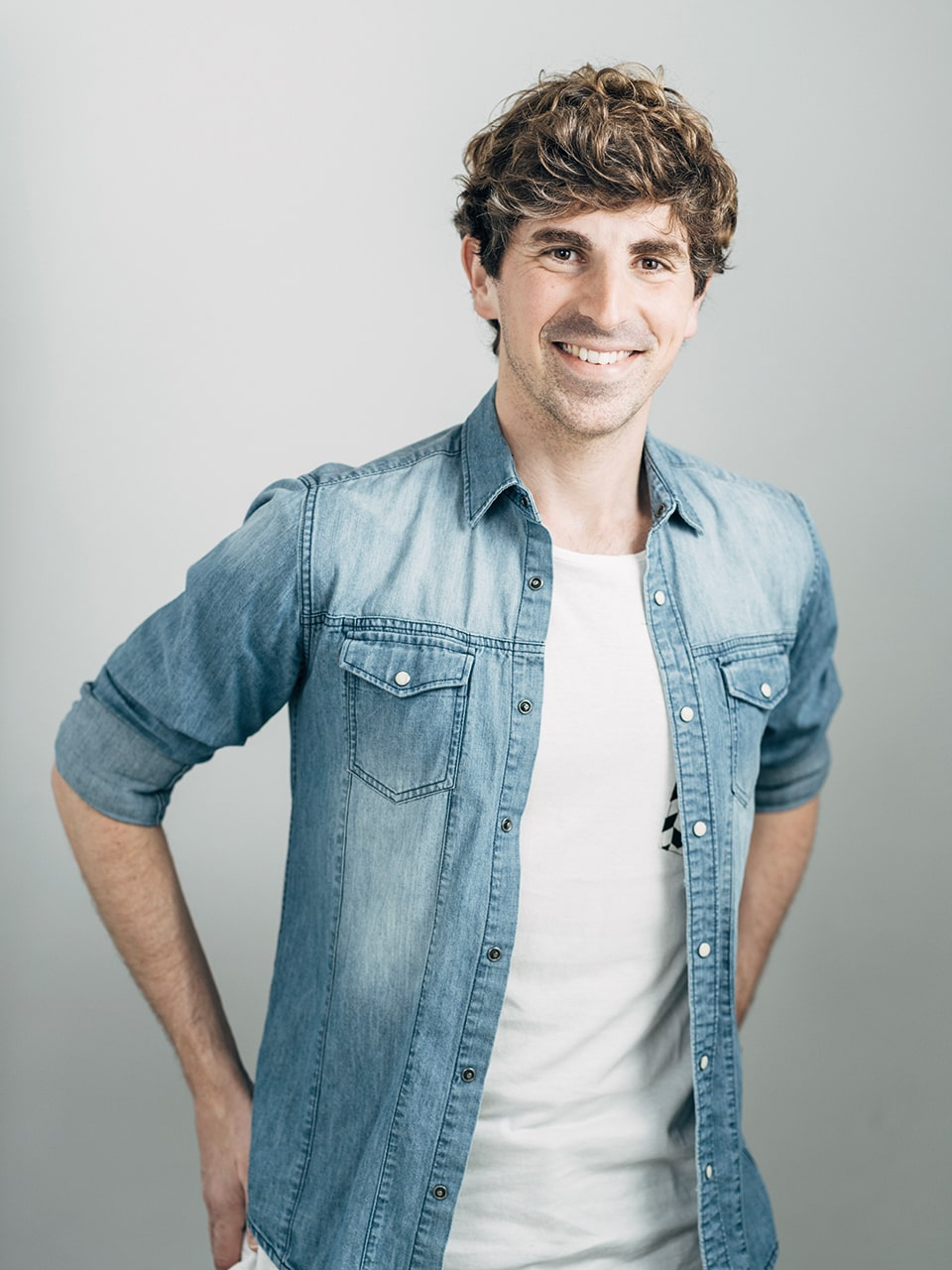

Jon Insausti Maisterra (born 21 February 1989) is a Spanish politician of the Basque Nationalist Party (EAJ-PNV). He was elected to the city council of San Sebastián in 2015 and became the mayor in 2025.

== Biography ==
Born in San Sebastián, Insausti graduated in business administration from the University of the Basque Country. He was elected to the city council in 2015, with Eneko Goia of his party becoming mayor, and in January 2018 he was put in charge of culture and education, as well as being made spokesperson of the party group. For the 2019 Spanish local elections he was put eighth on the party list, and ten were elected. He was put in charge of culture and the Basque language, and for the 2023 elections he was placed third, as his party took nine seats.

On 2 October 2025, Goia resigned after a decade as mayor and said that his successor would be appointed by the party leadership, amid speculation that it would be Insausti. The following day, Insausti was confirmed as successor, with the handover planned for Goia's resignation date of 16 October. He was invested as mayor on 29 October.

As mayor, Insausti opposed holiday let apartments. After a 2018 regulation, their number dropped from 2,200 to 1,300, or 1.4% of the city, which he considered still too high. In April 2025, while in charge of tourism, he said that the greater problem for housing was second homes and vacant properties, which were 16% of residences. In July 2026, a tourist tax was approved, which was projected to make €8 million annually.
