= María Cristina Bridge =

Bridge in Spain

Coordinates: 43.3173°N 1.9783°W

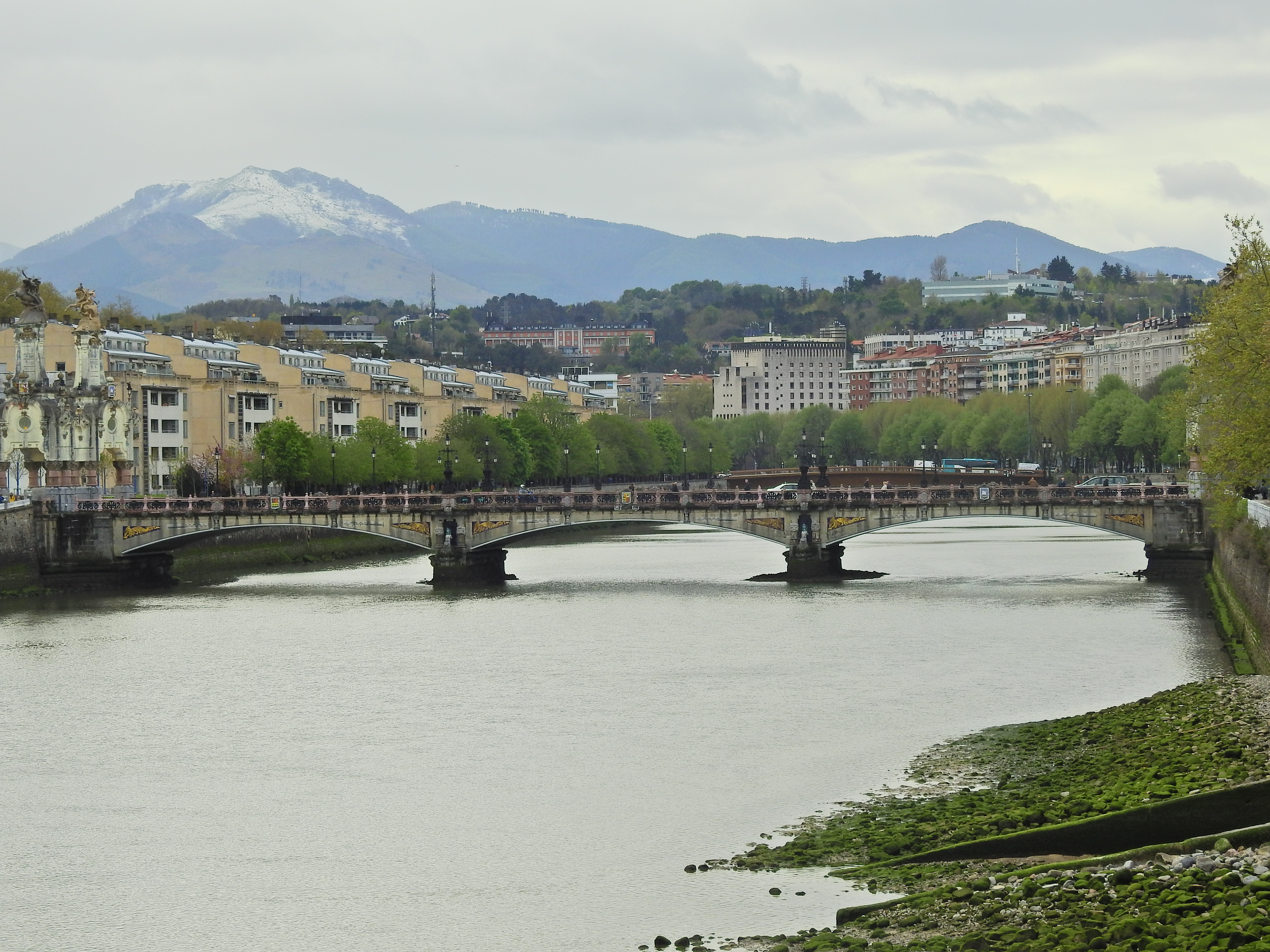
María Cristina Bridge in April 2019.

María Cristina Bridge (Basque: Maria Kristina zubia, Spanish: Puente de María Cristina) is a bridge over the Urumea river passing through the Basque city of San Sebastián (Spain).

== Construction and opening ==
In 1893 a temporary wooden walkway was built that would allow direct access from downtown to the North Station, the bullfighting arena or the velodrome.

On day 19, before the opening of the new bridge, the suspension was driving on the old wooden bridge, for its subsequent destruction.

The final bridge was inaugurated on January 20, 1905, festivity of Saint Sebastian.

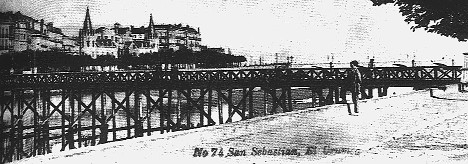
María Cristina Bridge in 1893.

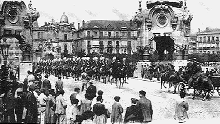
Welcome to Spanish Royalty, January 20, 1905.

The invitation stated: "Tengo el honor de invitar a V... al solemne acto de la inauguración del Puente de María Cristina que se celebrará el día 20 del corriente, a las 3 de la tarde y al té que a continuaciónde la indicada ceremonia tendrá lugar en la Casa Consistorial. San Sebastián, 15 de Enero de 1905. El Alcalde Presidente del Excelentísimo Ayuntamiento. De levita o uniforme."

The Caja de Ahorros of the municipality had funded the construction of the bridge with a credit to one hundred years without interest. Ribera and Zapata had been the authors of the project and Marcelo Sarasola and José de Goicoa, engineer and municipal architect, respectively.

On the bridge highlighted the four monumental obelisks, located at its ends, copies of the Alexander III bridge in Paris, of 18 metres of high, crowned by sculptural groups. It was built on reinforced concrete, which was a novelty for that time, with three arches of 24 metres of long, with 20 metres of wide and 88 of long.

The opening was cause of a great celebration. At 3 o'clock in the evening began with the performing of the music band La Unión. After played the music bands of two infantry companies. Then entered the band of the city council with the corporation, press, etc.., Which came from the Pescadería Street and during all the tour were decked balconies. In case of bad weather was expected to make a special trip by tram.

In the nearby streets had large audience. And a ringing of bells announced the arrival of the religious authority.

Later the Orfeón Donostiarra and the Choir of the Municipal Academy of Music of San Sebastián consisted of 110 children, sang a hymn composed for the occasion by the master Santesteban.

At half past six p.m. almost whole the neighborhood had gathered near of North Station to witness the fireworks and the toro de fuego scheduled. San Sebastián had three years without festivities as protest for the ban of the Sokamuturras feasts by the City council, for consider that this celebration "was more own of a small town than a large capital" so that on January 14, 1902, had ignited outrage among the young people that had shown their anger stoning lampposts, shop windows, and official centers and newsrooms. So this day was taken police actions to avoid disturbances. Along the bull were about ten serenos with prepared sticks and to a few metres walked many others serenos, prompting loud protests of the neighborhood. And so ended this opening day.

== See also ==
- Basque country
