= Eneko Goia =

Spanish politician

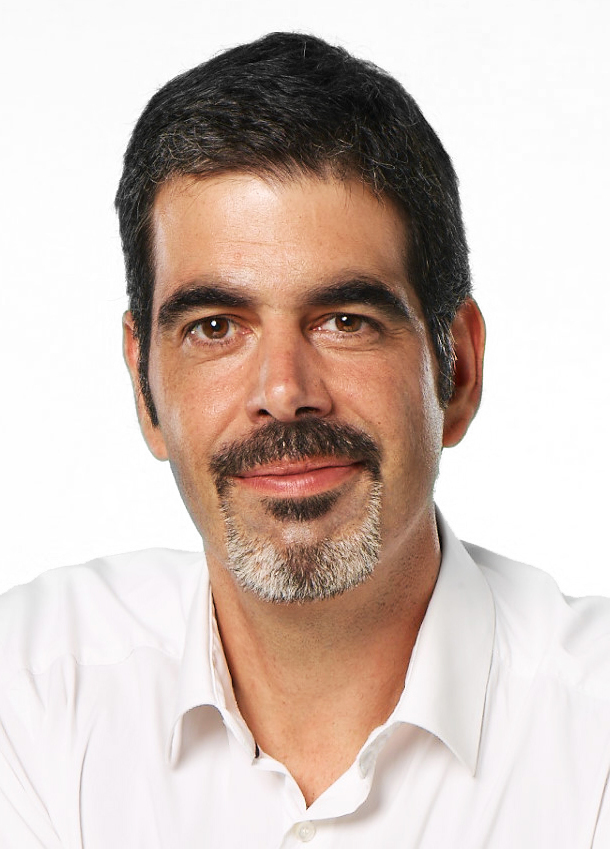

Eneko Goia Laso (born 30 October 1971) is a Spanish politician of the Basque Nationalist Party (EAJ-PNV). He was elected to the City Council of San Sebastián in 2011 as the party's leader, and was mayor from 2015 to 2025. He previously served in the Basque Parliament from 2005 to 2007, and the Deputation of Gipuzkoa from 2007 to 2011.

== Biography ==
=== Early life and career ===
Goia was born and raised in the Amara neighbourhood of San Sebastián in the Basque Country; as of 2015 he is married and has two sons and a daughter. He is a member and shareholder in San Sebastián football club Real Sociedad.

Goia graduated in Law from the University of the Basque Country and in Community Law from the University of Deusto. In 1996, he began teaching at the Higher Institute of Marketing of the Basque Country. He became a member of the Basque Nationalist Party (EAJ-PNV), first in its youth wing, Euzko Gaztedi. He was elected to the Basque Parliament in 2005, and left two years later when he was named in Markel Olano's government in the Deputation of Gipuzkoa, as Minister for Highway Infrastructure.

=== San Sebastián council ===
In May 2010, Goia was chosen as the EAJ-PNV candidate for mayor of San Sebastián in the 2011 election. His party came fourth with six out of 27 seats, and refused to form a broad front with the Spanish Socialist Workers' Party (PSOE) and People's Party (PP) in order to prevent Juan Karlos Izagirre of the left-wing Basque nationalist coalition Bildu from becoming mayor as leader of the largest party. Goia was the only other candidate to congratulate Izagirre on becoming the new mayor.

Goia was again the EAJ-PNV candidate in 2015, coming first with nine seats and being invested mayor due to a mutual agreement with the PSOE to abstain on the vote to invest the other's candidate. He became his party's first mayor in the city since Ramón Labayen was defeated in 1987. The party's seats rose to 10 in 2019, and he was invested for another term in coalition with the PSOE; the balance between the parties had shifted from 9–7 to 10–5. In 2023, he was re-elected for a third term with the support of his nine councillors, while Bildu's eight voted for their candidate and other parties abstained.

On 16 October 2025, Goia resigned, and was succeeded by Jon Insausti.
