= Miramar Palace =

Palace in San Sebastián, Spain

Coordinates: 43°18′53″N 1°59′54″W

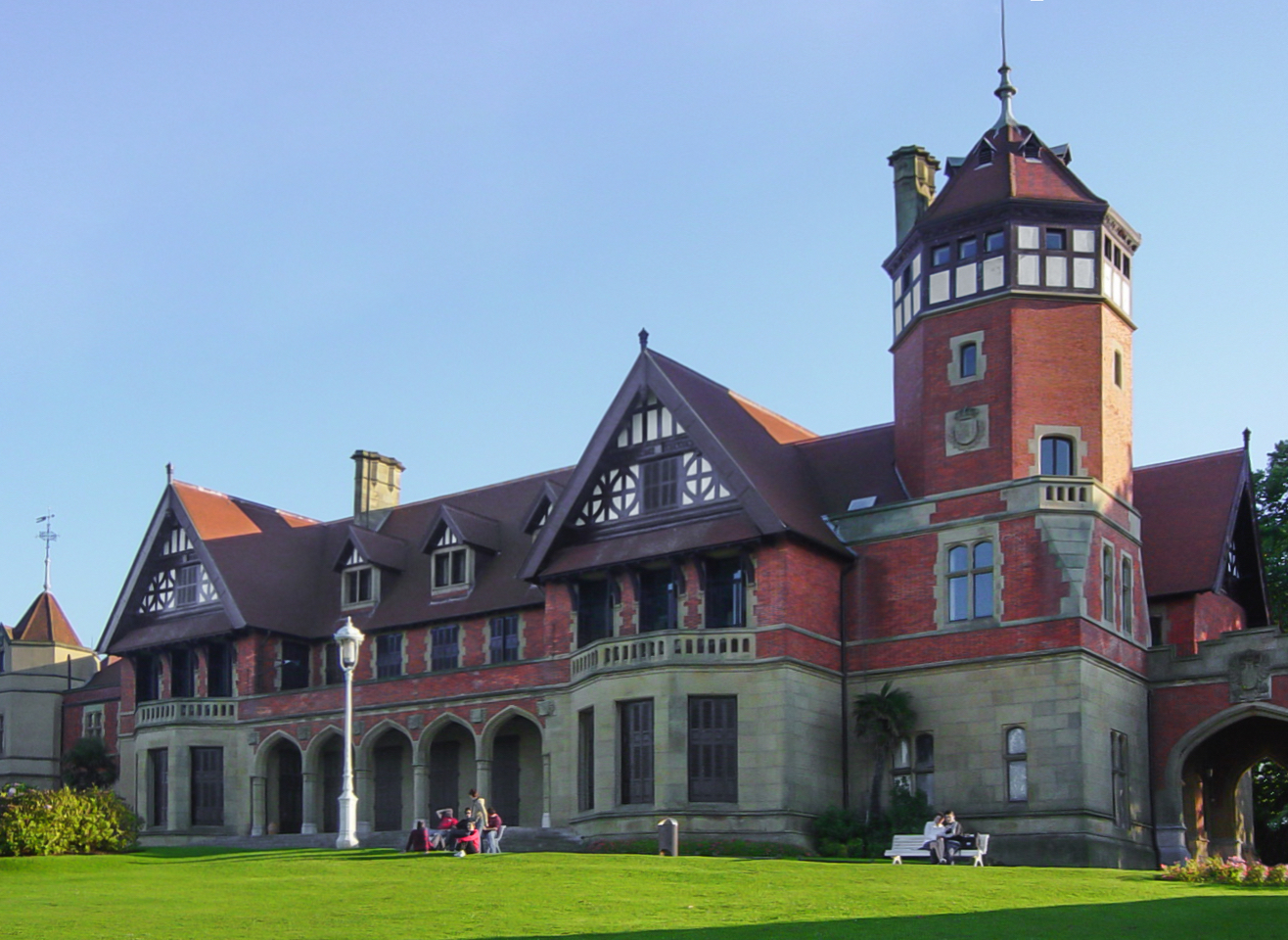
Miramar Palace

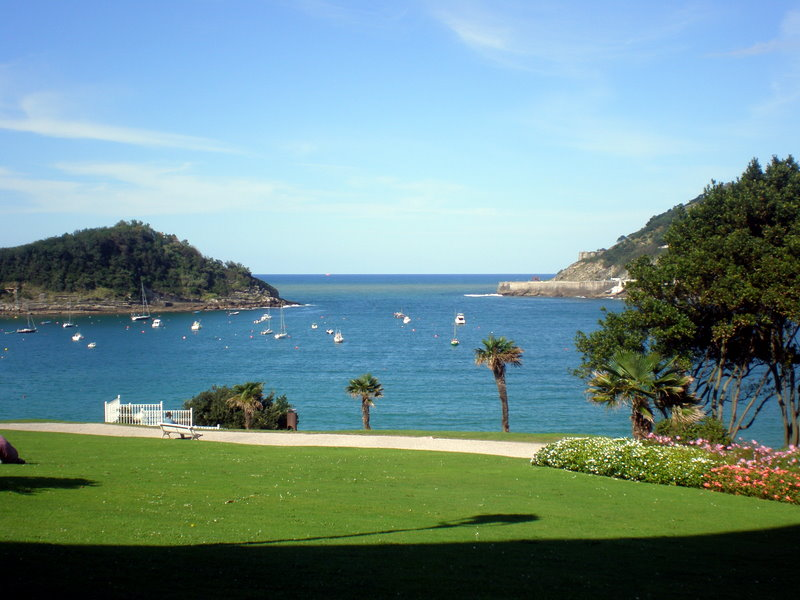
Palace gardens and view over La Concha Bay

The Miramar Palace (Spanish: Palacio de Miramar, also known as Palacio Municipal de Miramar or Palacio Real; Basque: Miramar jauregia) is a late 19th-century palace located on the La Concha Bay of the city of San Sebastián, Basque Country, Spain. It was built in 1893, commissioned by the Spanish royal family, based on an 1889 project by English architect Selden Wornum.

== History ==
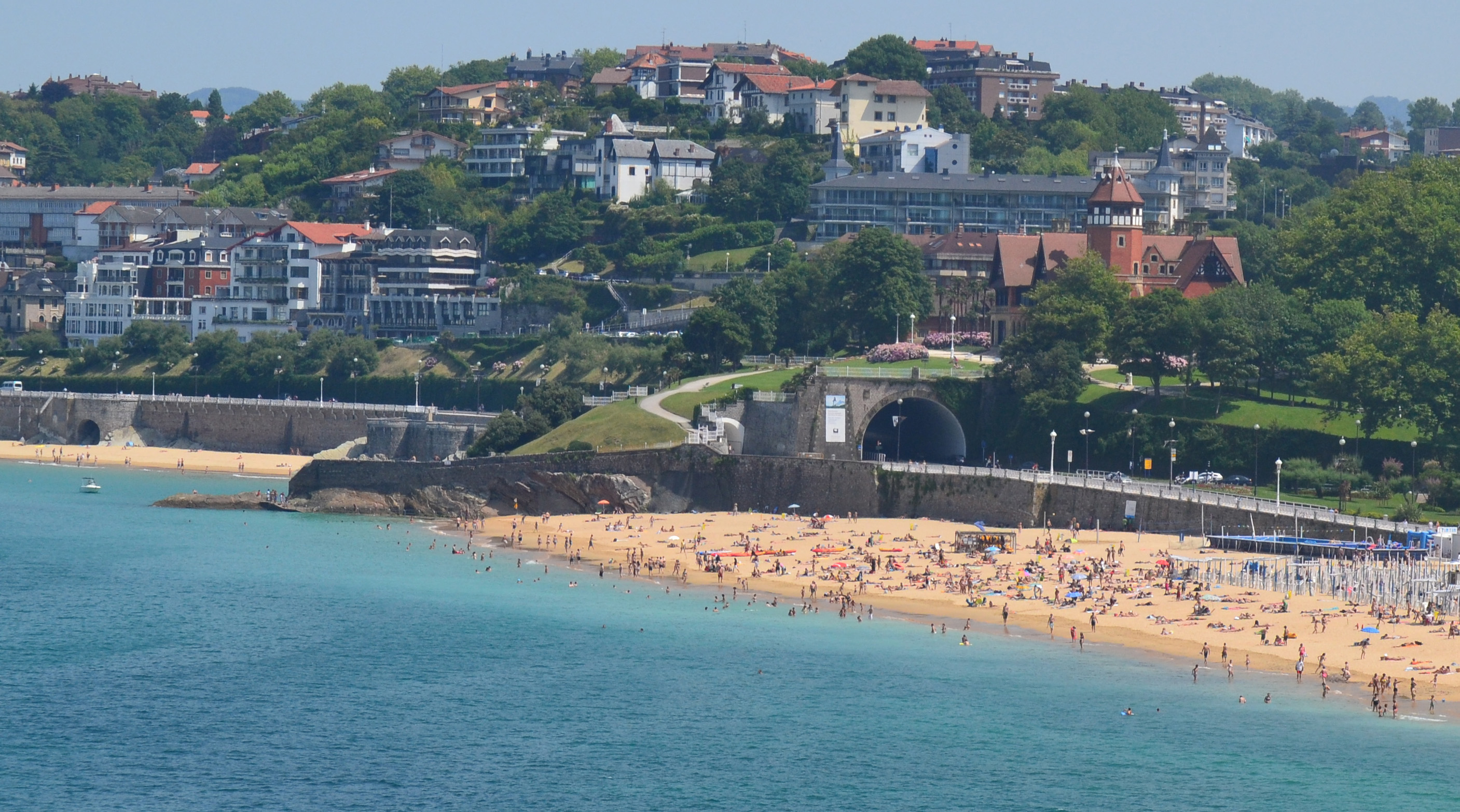
Miramar Palace's location between the Beach of la Concha and the Beach of Ondarreta

The close relationship between San Sebastián and the Spanish Royal Crown began with Isabella II of Spain, who, in the mid-19th century, began to summer in the city in order to take sea baths. The bond became stronger when Maria Christina of Austria, consort of Alfonso XII of Spain, moved the court's summer location to San Sebastián when she was widowed. The royal family's summer visits required a Royal Summer House, which was commissioned by Maria Christina from English architect Selden Wornum. The site chosen for the palace was a large estate over la Concha Bay where the Monastery of San Sebastián el Antiguo had been located; the Queen bought the estate from the Count of Moriana. The estate was enlarged with an adjacent estate where el Antiguo Church was located – the church had to be moved to a nearby site – and some other small estates. The palace was finished in 1893, although a new building named the Pabellón del Príncipe (Prince's Pavilion) was added in 1920. The construction of the palace required a false tunnel for the crossing of the trams – the tunnel passes under the palace gardens.

After Maria Christina's death in 1929, the palace was inherited by Alfonso XIII of Spain, and afterwards confiscated by the government in 1931 with the advent of the Second Spanish Republic. In 1933 it passed into the hands of the San Sebastián City Council with the condition that it would serve as the summer retreat of the president of the republic and that part of the facilities would be used for educational and cultural purposes.

During Francoism, the palace returned to the hands of Alfonso XIII's children, principally to Don Juan de Borbón. The joint ownership over the estate was dissolved in 1958. Don Juan retained the palace and the immediate surroundings, except for a 1,000 square-metre plot, sold in 1963. The rest of the estate, separated in two plots of 10,000 and 37,000 square metres, was sold in 1963 in benefit of Juan de Borbón's siblings for housing construction.

After the dissolution of the joint ownership, the initial area of 80,000 square metres of the estate was reduced to 34,136 square metres, bought by the San Sebastián City Council from Don Juan in 1972.

Currently, the palace gardens are open to the public in fixed opening hours, and the noble rooms can be visited in guided tours on fixed times. The Miramar Palace houses the summer courses of the University of the Basque Country. Until 2016, the palace housed Musikene, the Higher School of Music of the Basque Country.

== Design ==
The Miramar Palace has a purely English style and presents some neogothic ornaments. Inside it has some noble areas that remain faithful to their original configuration, among them White Hall, Music Hall, Wooden Hall, Petit Salon, the Library and the Royal Dining Room. The rest of the palace has been renovated successively since it was acquired by the City Council, making it more functional. The last works were conducted in 2001 to build classrooms for Musikene. In 2007, the tower of the palace was refurbished.

The palace preserves the original outside look. Parties are conducted in the palace's gardens and noble areas, particularly in the context of the San Sebastián International Film Festival.
