= Basque Country =

Map showing the geographical and political divisions of the Basque Country

Basque Country may refer to:

- Basque Country (greater region), frequently called by its Basque name Euskal Herria, the concept of a cultural area of the Basque people, culture and language

== Spain ==
- Basque Country (autonomous community) (Basque: Euskadi; Spanish: País Vasco, French: Pays Basque), also called Euskadi, is an autonomous community in Spain (shown in pink on the map)
- Southern Basque Country (Hego Euskal Herria or Hegoalde), the Basque provinces in Spain i.e. the autonomous community of the Basque Country plus the Foral community of Navarre (shown in pink and green on the map)

== France ==
- Northern Basque Country (Basque: Iparralde or French Basque Country, as used in France (Pays Basque), the three (historic) northern provinces in France (shown in yellow on the map)

== See also ==
- Basque (disambiguation)
