= City Council of San Sebastián =

Governing Institution of San Sebastián, Spain

- Donostiako Udala
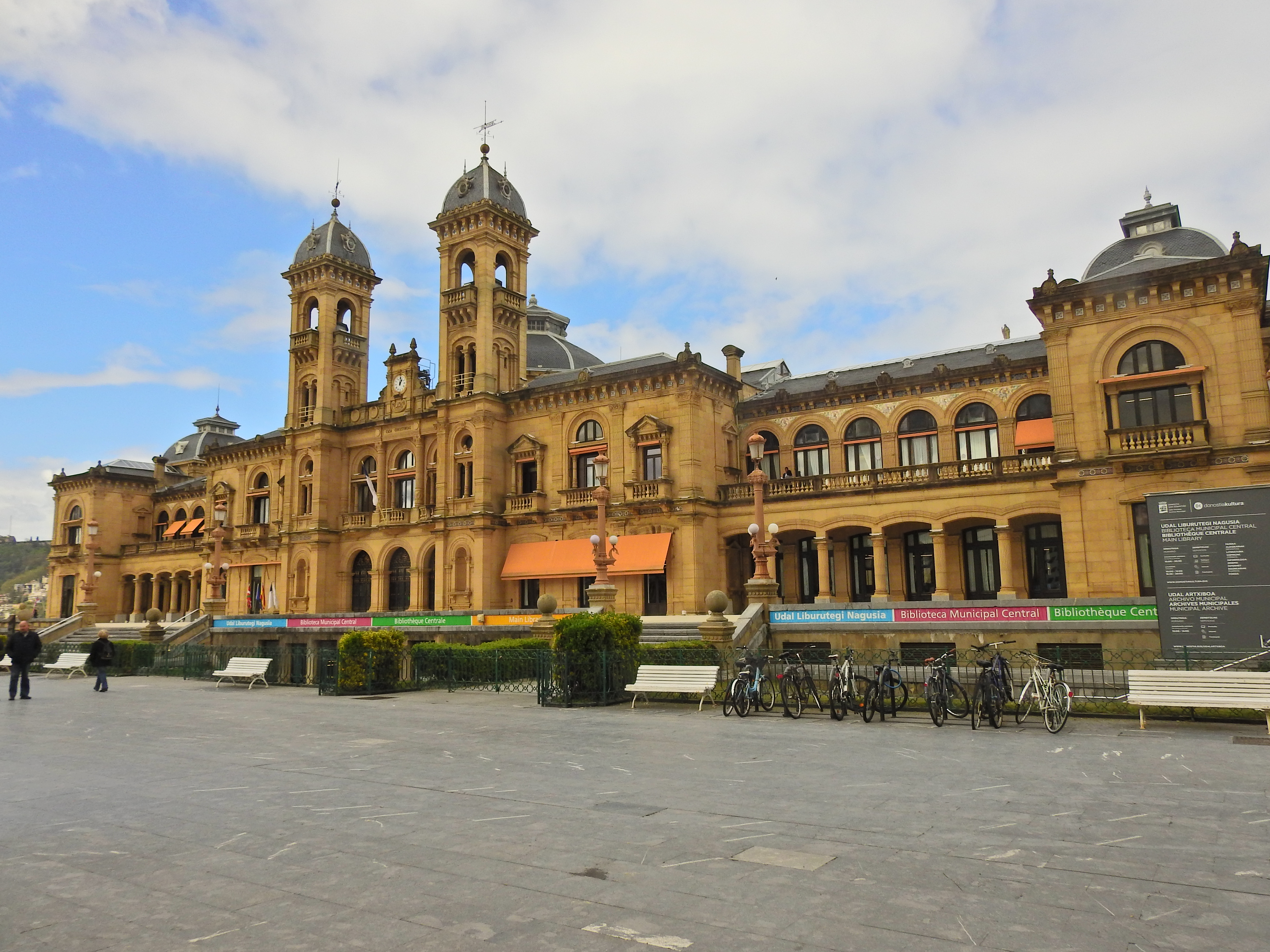
- The City Hall, former casino built in 1887.
- Interactive map of the City Council of San Sebastián area
- Former names: Great Casino

General information
- Architectural style: Neo-Classical
- Classification: Municipal building
- Location: San Sebastián, Basque Country, Spain
- Coordinates: 43.32159°N 1.98578°W
- Completed: 1 July 1887

Website
- https://www.donostia.eus

The City Council of San Sebastián (Basque: Donostiako Udala, Spanish: Ayuntamiento de San Sebastián) is the institution that governs the Basque city of San Sebastián (Spain). Its premises are located in the former casino of the city next to the Bay of La Concha.

== Building ==
The building was built in 1887 at the Gardens of Alderdi-Eder of San Sebastián, next to the Nautical Royal Club, to house the main casino. The opening ceremony was attended by Queen Maria Christina of Austria. However, it closed as a casino after the ban on gambling in 1924. On 14 April 1928, an agreement was reached to open in this building the Center of Attraction and Tourism, later this moved to a building next to Hotel María Cristina. On 20 January 1945, the council moved to this building. The architects Alday and Arizmendi amended the initial project in 1943 and turned the former casino into council. Until then, the City Hall was located in Constitution Square (Parte Vieja), now headquarters of the Municipal Library.

== City administration ==
After the democratic restoration in 1977 and after a brief period in which a municipal manager, led first by Ramón Jáuregui and subsequently by Iñaki Alkiza, took over the city government, the first democratic elections were held in 1979. Although lacking absolute majority, candidate of the Basque Nationalist Party (PNV) Jesús María Alkain prevailed for Mayor. In the next term (1983–1987), Ramón Labayen took over his party fellow, also without absolute majority. However, San Sebastián became a stronghold of PNV's splinter party Eusko Alkartasuna, with its candidate making it to office at the next election (1987). They formed a minority coalition government with Euskadiko Ezkerra, which allowed it to remain as mayor during the term 1987–1991. In 1991, Odón Elorza (PSE-EE/PSOE) became mayor, with the support of PP and PNV. With various covenants (with PNV and EA in 1995, with PP in 1999), he remained at the head of the council since then, and since 1999 with majority of votes and seats. After the 2007 elections, PSE-PSOE formed government with the municipal group Aralar-Alternatiba (formerly Aralar-Ezker Batua). In the May 2011 elections, Bildu's candidate Juan Carlos Izagirre won unexpectedly the elections, starting off a new period. Eneko Goia (PNV) has served as mayor since 2015, the first of his party to hold the position since Labayen in 1987. He was reelected in 2019 and again in 2023. These are the mayors who have governed the city council since the 1979 election:

| Mayor | Start of term | End of term | Party |
| Jesús María Alkain | 1979 | 1983 | EAJ-PNV |
| Ramón Labayen | 1983 | 1987 | EAJ-PNV |
| Xabier Albistur | 1987 | 1991 | Eusko Alkartasuna |
| Odón Elorza | 1991 | 2011 | PSE (1991–1993); PSE-EE (1993–2011) |
| Juan Carlos Izagirre | 2011 | 2015 | Bildu |
| Eneko Goia | 2015 | 2024 | EAJ-PNV |

Composition of the city council of San Sebastián since the 1979 elections

| Name | Legislature | | | | | | | | | | | |
| Name | 1979–1983 | 1983–1987 | 1987–1991 | 1991–1995 | 1995–1999 | 1999–2003 | 2003–2007 | 2007–2011 | 2011–2015 | 2015–2019 | 2019–2023 | 2023–2027 |
| EAJ-PNV (EAJ-PNV) | 9 | 10 | 3 | 4 | 3 | 7 | 9 | 5 | | | | |
| Herri Batasuna (HB) / Euskal Herritarrok (EH) | 6 | 5 | 6 | 5 | 4 | 5 | ~ | ~ | | | | |
| People's Party of the Basque Country (PP) / Coalición Popular / Coordinadora Independiente | 5 | 3 | 2 | 5 | 7 | 6 | 7 | 6 | | | | |
| Socialist Party of the Basque Country – Euskadiko Ezkerra (PSE-EE) / Socialist Party of the Basque Country-PSOE (PSE-PSOE) | 4 | 7 | 5 | 5 | 7 | 9 | 10 | 11 | | | | |
| Euskadiko Ezkerra (EE) | 3 | 2 | 4 | 2 | ~ | ~ | ~ | ~ | | | | |
| Eusko Alkartasuna (EA) | ~ | ~ | 7 | 6 | 5 | (by agreement) | (by agreement) | (by agreement) | | | | |
| Ezker Batua – Berdeak (EB-B) | ~ | ~ | ~ | ~ | ~ | 1 | 2 | (by agreement) | | | | |
| Aralar / Alternatiba | ~ | ~ | ~ | ~ | ~ | ~ | ~ | 1 | | | | |
| Bildu | ~ | ~ | ~ | ~ | ~ | ~ | ~ | 8 | | | | |
| Podemos | ~ | ~ | ~ | ~ | ~ | ~ | ~ | 1 | | | | |
| Others | 1 | 1 | ~ | ~ | ~ | ~ | ~ | ~ | | | | |
| Total | 28 | 28 | 28 | 27 | 27 | 35 | 36 | 39 | | | | |
