= Igueldo funicular =

Funicular railway in San Sebastián, Spain

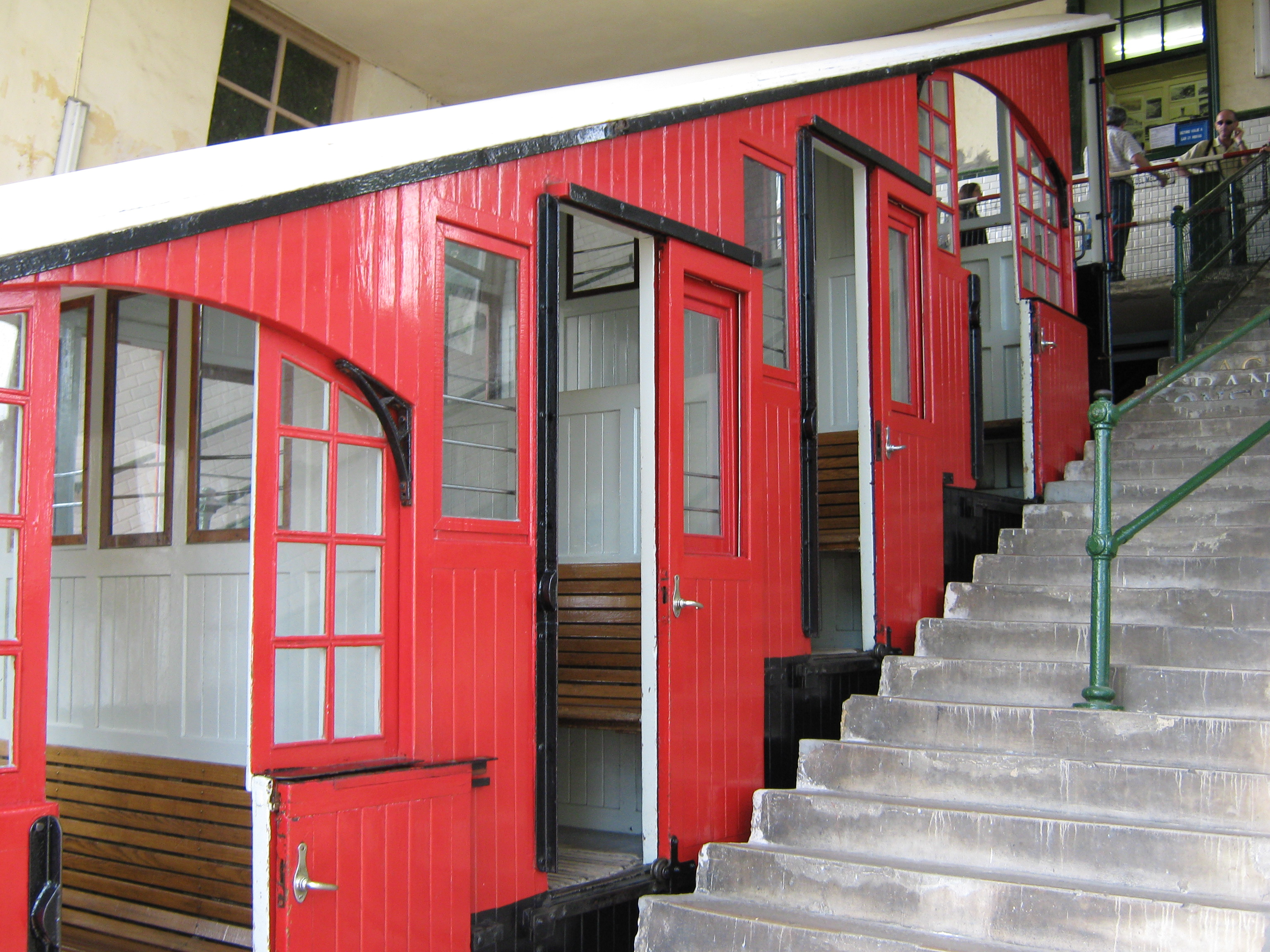

The Igueldo funicular (Basque: Igeldoko funikularra; Spanish: Funicular de Igueldo) is a funicular railway in the city of San Sebastián, in Spain.

Located on the side of a steep cliff face, Funicular de Igueldo consists of two carriages carrying passengers both up and down on a single track with a passing loop at the midpoint. Travelling the distance of 320 metres, the funicular connects Ondarreta Beach at the bottom, with the popular Monte Igeldo Amusement Park at the top, offering spectacular coastal views of La Concha Bay along the way.

== History ==
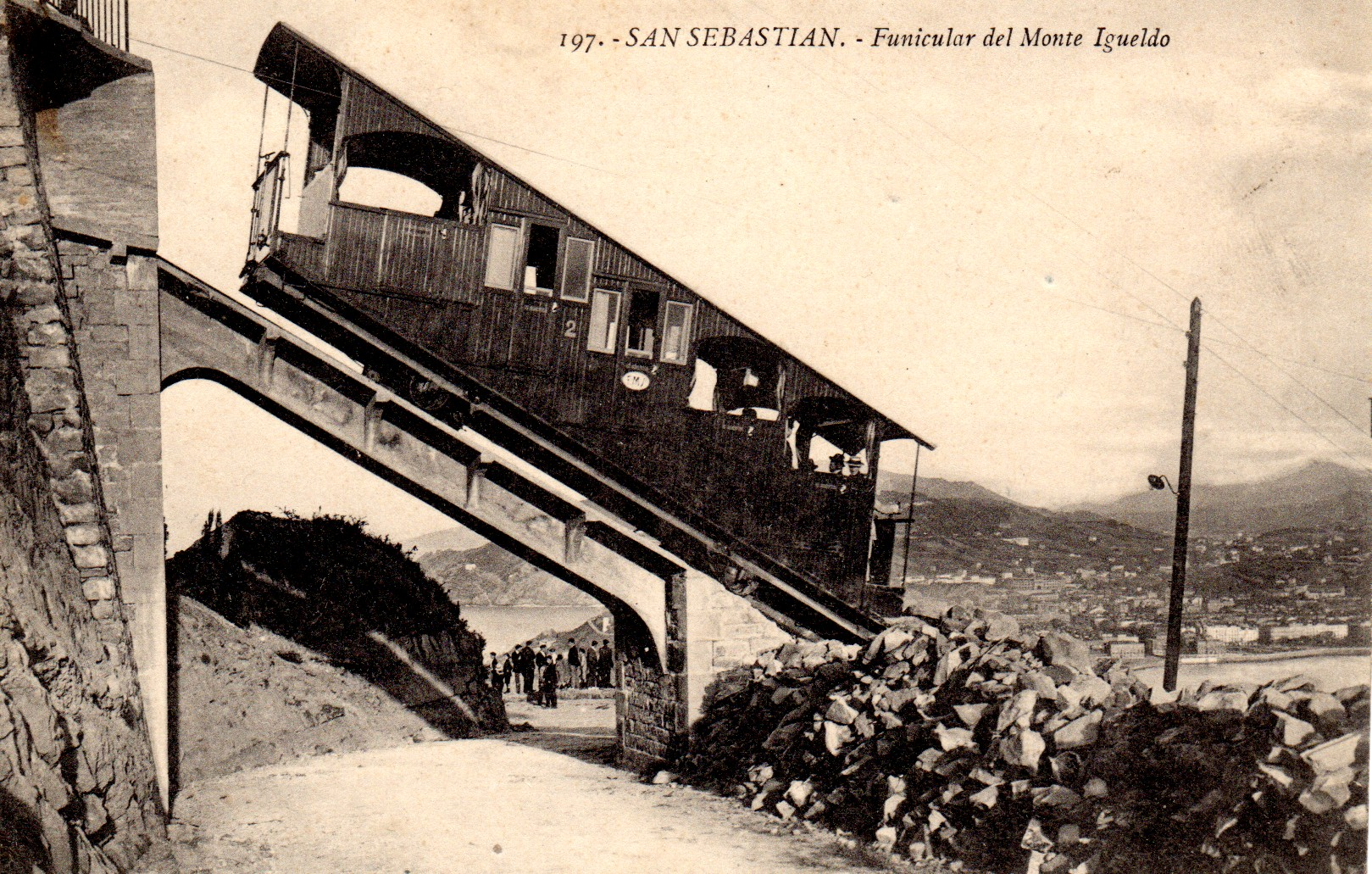
Old picture of the funicular.

It was opened on August 25, 1912 by Queen Maria Cristina. It is the oldest funicular railway in the Basque Country and the third oldest in Spain. Built under the design of the engineer Emilio Huizi, the work was directed by Severiano Goñi, also an engineer.

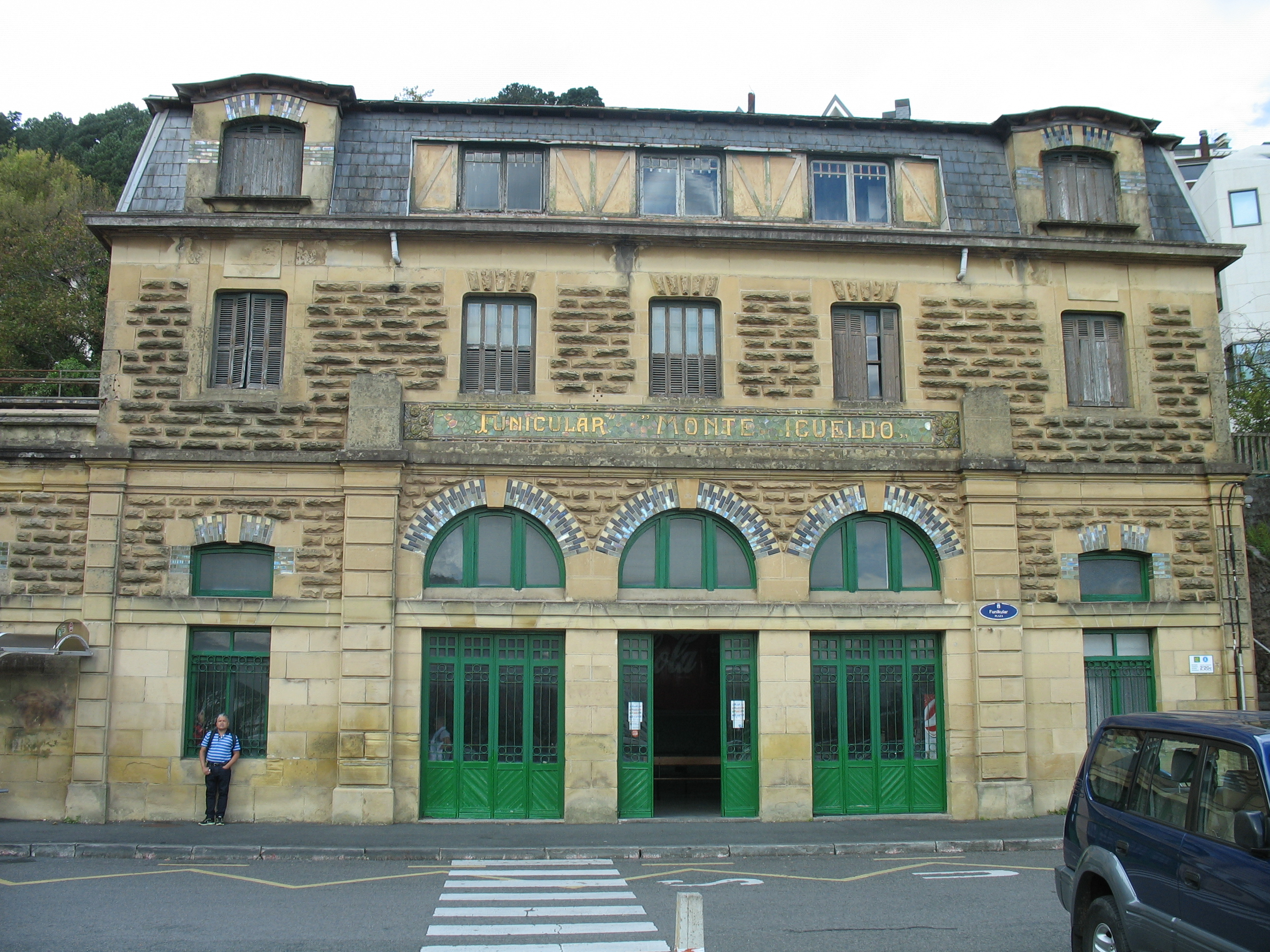
Igueldo Station

The funicular and the road up were built to connect San Sebastian with the Casino-Torre de Igeldo. When the casino was closed in 1967, the hotel was built.
