= Chavarri Palace =

Landmark building in Bilbao, Spain

Coordinates: 43.2634°N 2.9356°W

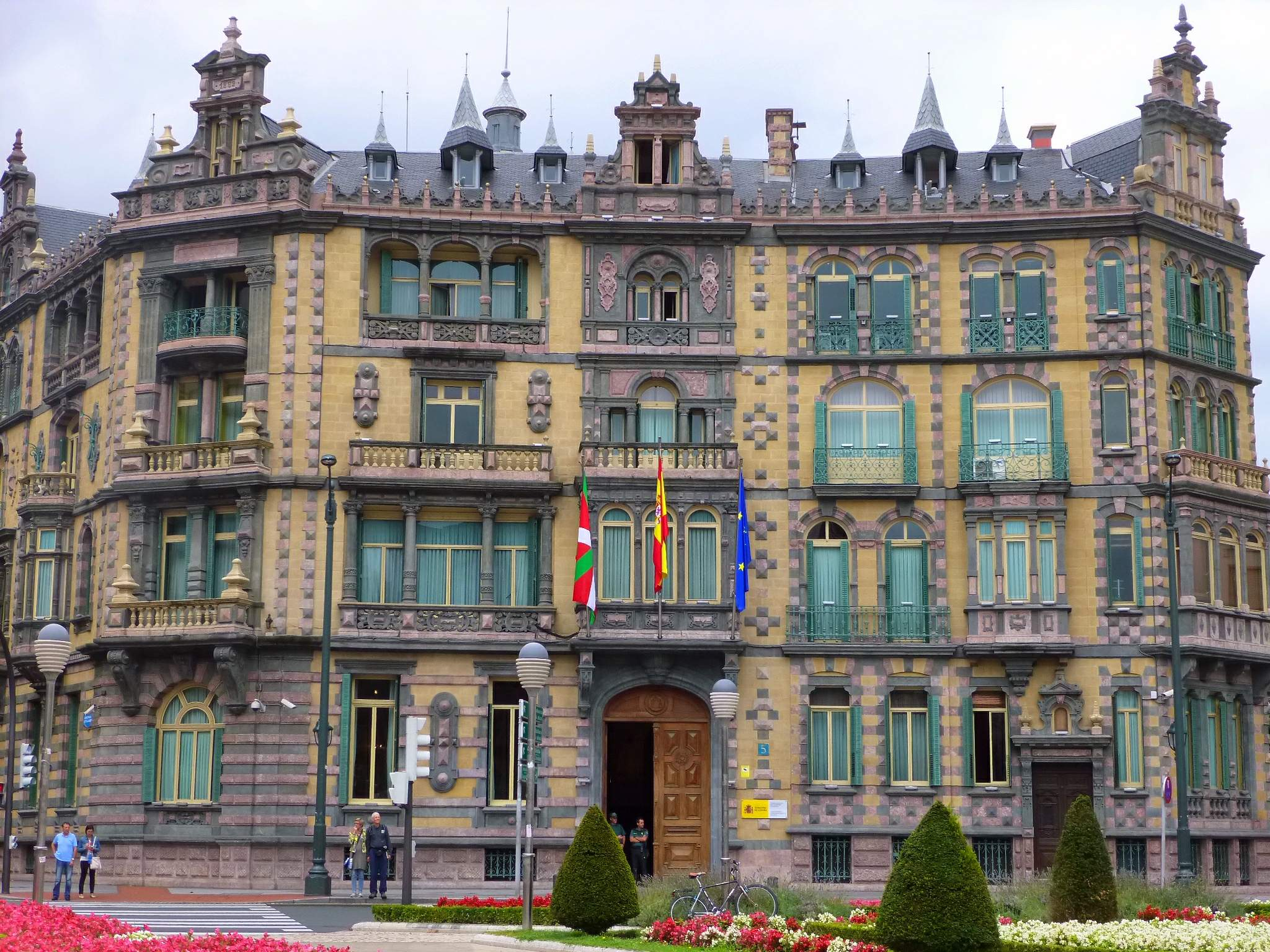
Chavarri Palace from Elíptica Square

The Chavarri Palace (Spanish: Palacio Chávarri) is a building in the Flemish style in the city of Bilbao, the most outstanding around the Elíptica Square. It was built in the early 20th century and its style resembles the palaces built during the Renaissance in Antwerp or Bruges.

One of the most interesting features of the buildings is that none of the sets of windows is the same as any other.

The palace accommodates the representation of the Government of Spain in the province of Biscay.

== Sources ==
- Elías Mas Serra El Palacio Chavarri, in the monthly magazine Bilbao, August 2006
- Pérez de la Peña Oleaga, Gorka (2005): Guía de arquitectura urbana de Bilbao: Cien obras maestras. Ed. Guías Cruziales
- Álvaro Chapa and Susana Chávarri (2014): El Palacio Chávarri
