= Musikene =

Music college in Donostia, Spain

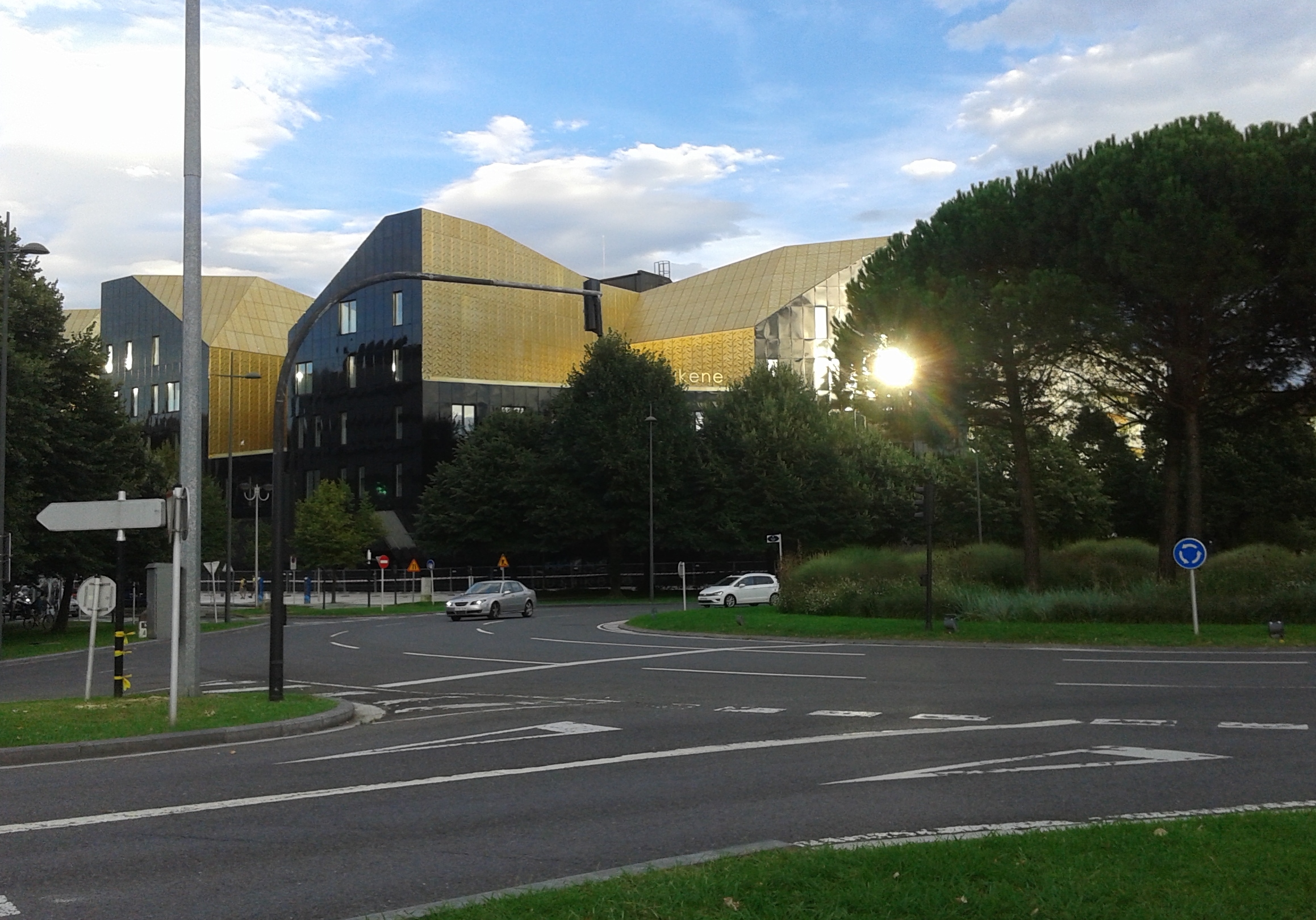
- Musikene's seat, in San Sebastián.
- Type: Private
- Established: 2001
- Location: San Sebastián, Basque Country, Spain
- Website: musikene.eus

Musikene or the Higher School of Music of the Basque Country (Basque - Euskal Herriko Goi-Mailako Musika Ikastegia; Spanish - Centro Superior de Música del País Vasco) is a higher education music school located in San Sebastián, in the Basque Autonomous Community of Spain. It is the Superior Music Conservatory of Basque Autonomous Community and offers university training and degrees in the field of music, orchestral conducting and instrumentation.

It was founded in 2001 by the Basque Government through the establishment of a private foundation.

The school was housed on the Miramar Palace. In 2012, the construction of a new building, which houses the school since the 2016–2017 academic year, began next to the San Sebastián campus of the University of the Basque Country.
