= List of deputies general of Álava =

This is a list of deputies general of Álava. The deputy general is the head of the government of Álava, Basque Country, Spain. The post originated in the late fifteenth century, and existed in its first form until the end of Basque home rule in Spain in 1876. From 1877 to 1979, the head of the province of Álava was known as President of the Deputation. The post has existed in its current form since 1979.

== List of officeholders ==
=== Deputies General (1979-present) ===
Governments:

- EAJ/PNV
- PP
- Mixed coalition

Portrait	Name (Birth–Death)	Term of office			Party	Government Composition	Election	Ref.
Portrait	Name (Birth–Death)	Took office	Left office	Duration	Party	Government Composition	Election	Ref.
	Emilio Guevara (born 1941)	7 May 1979	29 May 1983	4 years and 22 days	EAJ/PNV	Guevara; EAJ/PNV	1979	
	Juan María Ollora (born 1949)	29 May 1983	17 July 1987	4 years and 49 days	EAJ/PNV	Ollora; EAJ/PNV	1983	
	Fernando Buesa (1946–2000)	17 July 1987	17 July 1991	4 years and 0 days	PSE	Buesa; PSE–EAJ/PNV	1987	
	Alberto Ansola (born 1943)	17 July 1991	13 July 1995	3 years and 361 days	EAJ/PNV	Ansola; EAJ/PNV–PSE	1991	
	Félix Ormazabal (1940–2022)	13 July 1995	26 July 1999	4 years and 13 days	EAJ/PNV	Ormazabal; EAJ/PNV–PSE-EE–EA until 1997; EAJ/PNV–EA from 1997	1995	
	Ramón Rabanera (born 1948)	26 July 1999	4 July 2003	8 years and 0 days	PP	Rabanera I PP–UA	1999	
	Ramón Rabanera (born 1948)	4 July 2003	26 July 2007	8 years and 0 days	PP	Rabanera II; PP	2003	
	Xabier Agirre (1951–2021)	26 July 2007	7 July 2011	3 years and 346 days	EAJ/PNV	Agirre; EAJ/PNV–EA–Aralar until 2009; EAJ/PNV–EA from 2009	2007	
	Javier de Andrés (born 1967)	7 July 2011	30 June 2015	3 years and 358 days	PP	de Andrés; PP	2011	
	Ramiro González (born 1962)	30 June 2015	4 July 2019	9 years and 339 days	EAJ/PNV	González I EAJ/PNV–PSE-EE	2015	
	Ramiro González (born 1962)	4 July 2019	29 June 2023	9 years and 339 days	EAJ/PNV	González II; EAJ/PNV–PSE-EE	2019	
	Ramiro González (born 1962)	29 June 2023	Incumbent	9 years and 339 days	EAJ/PNV	González III; EAJ/PNV–PSE-EE	2023	
