= Félix Ormazabal =

Spanish politician (1940–2022)

Deputy General of Álava
- In office 13 July 1995 – 26 July 1999
- Preceded by: Alberto Ansola
- Succeeded by: Ramón Rabanera

Head of the Department of Agriculture and Fishing
- In office 1 April 1984 – 1 March 1988
- Lehendakari: Carlos Garaikoetxea (1979–Jan 1985); José Antonio Ardanza (Jan 1985–1988)
- Preceded by: Himself (Agriculture); Javier Lasagabaster (Territorial Planning and Sea Issues)
- Succeeded by: José Manuel Goikoetxea

Head of the Department of Agriculture
- In office 9 June 1979 – 31 March 1984
- Lehendakari: Carlos Garaikoetxea
- Preceded by: Pedro Morales
- Succeeded by: Himself (Agriculture and Fishing)

Member of the General Assembly of Álava
- In office 6 July 1999 – 9 November 2000
- Constituency: Vitoria-Gasteiz
- In office 22 June 1995 – 6 July 1999
- Constituency: Tierras Esparsas

Member of the Basque Parliament
- In office 22 March 1984 – 7 September 1995
- Constituency: Álava
- In office 31 March 1980 – 19 September 1980
- Constituency: Álava

Personal details
- Born: Félix Ormazabal Ascasibar; 5 May 1940 Araya, Spain
- Died: 15 January 2022 (aged 81) Vitoria-Gasteiz, Spain
- Party: EAJ/PNV

Félix Ormazabal Askasibar (5 May 1940 – 15 January 2022) was a Spanish politician. A member of the Basque Nationalist Party, he served as Deputy General of Álava from 1995 to 1999. He was also a member of the Basque Parliament in 1980 and again from 1984 to 1995. He died in Vitoria-Gasteiz on 15 January 2022, at the age of 81.

== Biography ==
Félix Ormazabal was born in Araia, Álava in 1940, he studied law and theology. As a priest in Zaramaga, he supported the workers who took part in the 1972 strike at the Michelin factory in Vitoria. As a result of his involvement, he was detained for a month and three days. He entered politics after meeting José Ángel Cuerda, who served as his lawyer during his detention.

He was first elected to public office in 1979, when he became a member of the Asparrena municipal council. In 1979 he became the head of the Department of Agriculture in the Basque General Council. He continued in that office until 1988, under Carlos Garaikoetxea and José Antonio Ardanza. He was also a member of the first government of the Foral Deputation of Álava after its restoration, serving with Deputy General Emilio Guevara. He was elected to the Basque Parliament five consecutive times, starting in 1980.

In 1995 he was elected to the General Assembly of Álava and subsequently became Deputy General. He headed a majority coalition government with Eusko Alkartasuna and the Socialist Party until 1997, when the Socialist Party left the coalition as a consequence of José Ángel Cuerda dismissing members of the party from the ruling coalition at the Vitoria-Gasteiz city council. He was the leading candidate of the Basque Nationalist Party in the 1999 election, in which it finished second behind the People's Party. In the second round of the investiture vote the Socialist Party supported Ramón Rabanera, the People's Party candidate, thus putting an end to Ormazabal's tenure as Deputy General.

He retired from politics in 2005. He died in January 2022 after a sudden heart attack at his home in Araia.
