= Albeniz (disambiguation) =

Albeniz may refer to:

== People ==
- Baltasar Albéniz (1905-1978), Spanish football manager
- Isaac Albéniz (1860-1909), Spanish pianist and composer
- Mateo Albéniz (1755-1831), Spanish composer and priest
- Pedro Albéniz (1795–1855), Spanish pianist and composer

== Other uses ==
- Albéniz (film), a 1947 biographical film about Isaac Albéniz
- 10186 Albéniz, an asteroid named after Isaac Albéniz
- Albéniz, Álava, a village in the Basque Country, Spain

== See also ==
- Albéniz Foundation, a private non-profit organization promoting classical music in Spain
