= Luis María Díaz de Otazu =

Spanish cyclist (born 1966)

Personal information
- Full name: Luis María Díaz De Otazu Galarza
- Born: 11 August 1966 (age 60) Albéniz, Álava, Spain

Cycling career
- Sport: Cycling
- Role: Rider

Luis María Díaz de Otazu Galarza (born 11 August 1966) is a Spanish former professional racing cyclist. He rode in the 1995 Tour de France.
