= Mari Jose Urruzola =

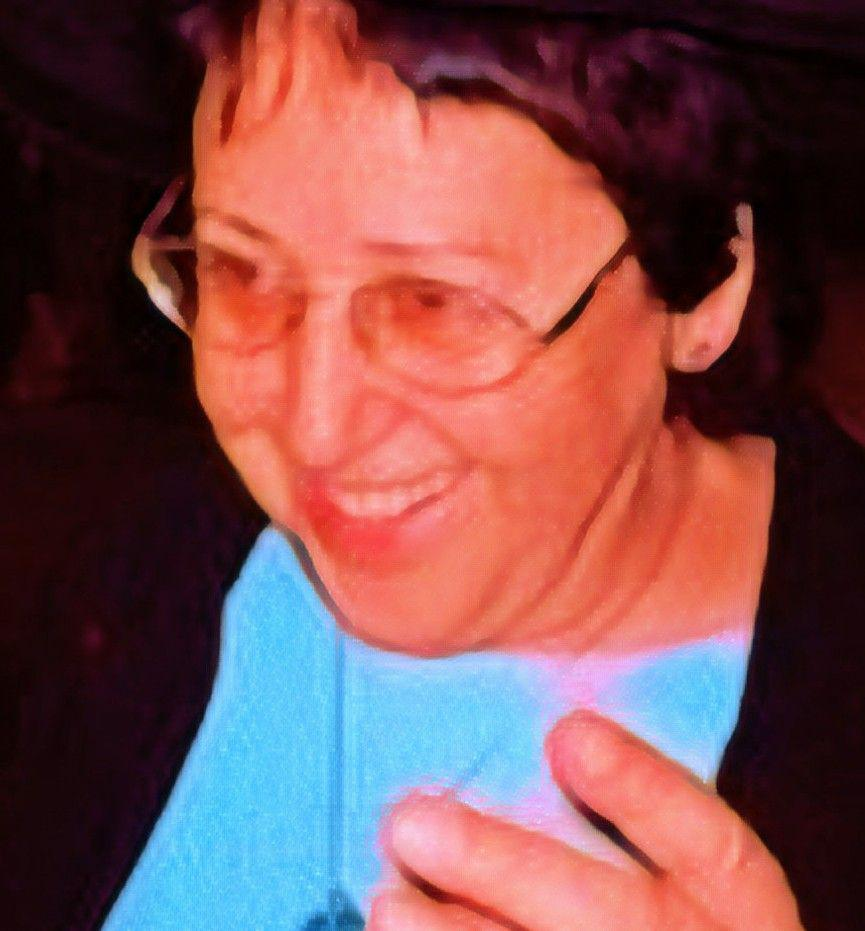
- (2005)
- Born: Mari Jose Urruzola Zabalza; 23 May 1940; Irun, Spain
- Died: 28 April 2006; Bilbao, Spain
- Occupations: educator; feminist; writer
- Known for: coeducation and education for equality movements
- Awards: Premio Emakunde a la Igualdad

Mari Jose Urruzola Zabalza (Irun, 23 May 1940 – Bilbao, 28 April 2006) was a Spanish educator, feminist, and writer associated with the coeducation and education for equality movements.

== Early life and education ==
Urruzola lived her childhood and adolescence between Donostia and Madrid. She worked to be able to afford university studies in Madrid where she graduated in philosophy and later she was a professor of that subject during her professional career. She completed a postgraduate course in coeducation at the University of Barcelona.

== Career ==
Urruzola was committed to coeducation and feminism in her life. Since the 1970s, through groups of women teachers and educators that emerged within the feminist movement, she began to study how to apply feminist theory to education, leading to coeducation. Starting in 1985, other social groups and institutions were incorporated into the coeducational task and non-sexist publications. Urruzola, within this evolution of the mixed school towards coeducation, conceived education as a means to improve people. In her experience as a teacher, Urruzola worked and disseminated her idea of educating in equality and without stereotypes, with coeducation as the fundamental basis. She wrote various books and educational guides for girls and adolescents on topics such as Gender-related violence, interpersonal relationships, and sex education.

For Urruzola, the fundamental steps to put coeducation into practice went through the evaluation of errors to correct them and create new steps that would lead from the mixed school of the moment towards coeducation. Because for her, the new educational model had to be achieved by "extracting the positive values of the feminine culture and those of the masculine" and also the elaboration of "a new concept of person" that would educate each girl and each boy in their individuality, starting from "difference", with all of this outside of the sexist stereotypes that limit human development. According to Urruzola:—

La Escuela se convertiría en un espacio social, donde las personas acudirían, no a aprender 'cosas', sino a aprender 'cosas' que les enseñen a ser personas. Así, estaremos colaborando a que cada persona elija después su aportación a la colectividad. Sería la aportaciónde la Escuela a la construcción de un nuevo modelo de sociedad.The School would become a social space, where people would go, not to learn 'things', but to learn 'things that teach them to be people'. Thus, we will be collaborating so that each person later chooses their contribution to the community. It would be the School's contribution to the construction of a new model of society.

Urruzola worked as a philosophy and ethics teacher in Bilbao institutes for more than 25 years. In the 1990s, she worked in the support services of the Department of Education of the Basque Government as a coeducation adviser until her retirement in 2001.

She founded the "Colectivo Feminista Lanbroa" (Lanbroa Feminist Collective), of which she was president, as well as the feminist associations "Emilia Pardo Bazán" and "Emaitza". She was a co-founder of the Confederation of Feminist Organizations. She also stood in the 1999 European Parliament election. In 2000, she was one of the founders of the Partido Feminista de Euskadi (Euskadi Feminist Party) that presented Zuriñe del Cerro as a candidate for Mayor of Bilbao.

== Awards and honours ==
- 2006, posthumously, the Premio Emakunde a la Igualdad (Emakunde Award for Equality)
- 2006, a tribute to the Coeducation Seminars
- 2008, a tribute by the Bilbao City Council, the Lanbroa Feminist Collective and the Feminist Party of Spain

== Selected works ==
=== Books ===
- Sexualidad en la escuela, 1985 ISBN 848562727X
- ¿Es posible coeducar en la actual escuela mixta?: una programación curricular de aula sobre las relaciones afectivas y sexuales
- Aprendiendo a amar desde el aula, 1991 ISBN 8487815014 OCLC 434843731
- Guía para chicas. Cómo andar por casa, 1992
- Guía para chicas. Cómo prevenir y defenderte de las agresiones, 1992
- Introducción a la filosofía coeducadora, 1995 ISBN 8487815065 OCLC 431821397
- Educación de las relaciones afectivas y sexuales desde la filosofía coeducadora, 1997 ISBN 848781509X OCLC 50040894
- Violencia de género: el maltrato escondido: guía para identificar y superar las causas de la violencia cotidiana, 2001 ISBN 8489590923 OCLC 52141150
- Igualdad y responsabilidad en la edad de la sabiduría: vivir y envejecer con protagonismo y autoridad personal, 2003 ISBN 8495930099 OCLC 433025687
- Vivir la separación como una oportunidad para aprender: guía para la corresponsabilidad en la reconstrucción emocional, 2003 ISBN 8495930064 OCLC 53953323

=== Collaborations in collective works ===
- Coeducar para el desarrollo físico, 1993
- Ser chica en una escuela de chicos, 1993
- La coeducación una alternativa transversal a la escuela actual, 1995
- Educar en la igualdad, un camino hacia la prevención de la violencia, 2000
- Una programación curricular de aula sobre las relaciones afectivas y sexuales, 2004
- Una programación curricular de aula sobre las relaciones afectivas y sexuales, 2007
- La educación de las relaciones afectivas y sexuales, 2007
