= 1987 Basque foral elections =

Elections in the Spanish region of the Basque Country

Foral elections were held in the Basque Country on 10 June 1987 to elect the 3rd General Assemblies of Álava, Biscay and Guipúzcoa. All 153 seats in the three General Assemblies were up for election. They were held concurrently with regional elections in thirteen autonomous communities and local elections all across Spain, as well as the 1987 European Parliament election.

== Overall ==
← Summary of the 10 June 1987 Basque foral election results →
Parties and alliances	Popular vote			Seats	
Parties and alliances	Votes	%	±pp	Total	+/−
Basque Nationalist Party (EAJ/PNV)	235,223	21.78	−17.78	32	−42
Popular Unity (HB)	207,382	19.21	+4.97	32	+12
Socialist Party of the Basque Country (PSE–PSOE)	204,118	18.90	−7.42	32	−7
Basque Solidarity (EA)	190,136	17.61	New	35	+35
Basque Country Left (EE)	106,797	9.89	+1.98	12	+6
People's Alliance (AP)^{1}	66,893	6.19	−2.61	6	−8
Democratic and Social Centre (CDS)	36,756	3.40	+3.08	4	+4
United Left (IU/EB)	8,786	0.81	New	0	±0
Workers' Party of Spain–Communist Unity (PTE–UC)^{2}	8,005	0.74	−1.30	0	±0
People's Democratic Party–Liberal Party (PDP–PL)	2,013	0.19	New	0	±0
Independent Group of the Sparse Lands (AITE)	1,196	0.11	New	0	±0
Left Socialist Coordinator (CSI)	855	0.08	New	0	±0
Humanist Platform (PH)	395	0.04	New	0	±0
Basque Social Democratic Party (PSDV)	249	0.02	New	0	±0
Blank ballots	11,007	1.02	+0.42		
Total	1,079,811			153	±0
Valid votes	1,079,811	99.07	+0.31		
Invalid votes	10,185	0.93	−0.31		
Votes cast / turnout	1,089,996	67.45	+2.86		
Abstentions	526,121	32.55	−2.86		
Registered voters	1,616,117				
Sources
Footnotes: ^{1} People's Alliance results are compared to People's Coalition totals in the 1983 elections.; ^{2} Workers' Party of Spain–Communist Unity results are compared to Communist Party of the Basque Country totals in the 1983 elections.

Popular vote
EAJ/PNV	21.78%
HB	19.21%
PSE–PSOE	18.90%
EA	17.61%
EE	9.89%
AP	6.19%
CDS	3.40%
Others	1.99%
Blank ballots	1.02%

== Deputation control ==
The following table lists party control in the foral deputations. Gains for a party are highlighted in that party's colour.

Province	Population	Previous control	New control
Álava	267,728	Basque Nationalist Party (EAJ/PNV)	Socialist Party of the Basque Country (PSE–PSOE)
Biscay	1,179,150	Basque Nationalist Party (EAJ/PNV)	Basque Nationalist Party (EAJ/PNV)
Guipúzcoa	689,222	Basque Solidarity (EA)	Basque Solidarity (EA)

== Historical territories ==
=== Álava ===
← Summary of the 10 June 1987 General Assembly of Álava election results →
Parties and alliances	Popular vote			Seats	
Parties and alliances	Votes	%	±pp	Total	+/−
Basque Solidarity (EA)	27,934	20.96	New	12	+12
Socialist Party of the Basque Country (PSE–PSOE)	26,241	19.69	−8.67	11	−3
Basque Nationalist Party (EAJ/PNV)	23,185	17.40	−19.71	10	−13
Popular Unity (HB)	18,653	14.00	+5.16	8	+4
People's Alliance (AP)^{1}	12,320	9.24	−6.32	4	−5
Basque Country Left (EE)	10,666	8.00	+1.85	3	+2
Democratic and Social Centre (CDS)	9,442	7.09	+5.33	3	+3
Independent Group of the Sparse Lands (AITE)	1,196	0.90	New	0	±0
Left Socialist Coordinator (CSI)	855	0.64	New	0	±0
Workers' Party of Spain–Communist Unity (PTE–UC)^{2}	619	0.46	−0.41	0	±0
People's Democratic Party (PDP)	607	0.46	New	0	±0
Blank ballots	1,544	1.16	+0.41		
Total	133,262			51	±0
Valid votes	133,262	98.83	+0.27		
Invalid votes	1,581	1.17	−0.27		
Votes cast / turnout	134,843	68.26	+1.46		
Abstentions	62,703	31.74	−1.46		
Registered voters	197,546				
Sources
Footnotes: ^{1} People's Alliance results are compared to People's Coalition totals in the 1983 election.; ^{2} Workers' Party of Spain–Communist Unity results are compared to Communist Party of the Basque Country totals in the 1983 election.

=== Biscay ===
← Summary of the 10 June 1987 General Assembly of Biscay election results →
Parties and alliances	Popular vote			Seats	
Parties and alliances	Votes	%	±pp	Total	+/−
Basque Nationalist Party (EAJ/PNV)	161,899	27.28	−12.30	16	−10
Socialist Party of the Basque Country (PSE–PSOE)	116,441	19.62	−8.16	12	−1
Popular Unity (HB)	104,625	17.63	+4.96	10	+4
Basque Solidarity (EA)	76,402	12.88	New	7	+7
Basque Country Left (EE)	55,554	9.36	+2.42	4	+2
People's Alliance (AP)^{1}	36,493	6.15	−3.76	1	−3
Democratic and Social Centre (CDS)	21,896	3.69	New	1	+1
United Left (IU/EB)	6,944	1.17	New	0	±0
Workers' Party of Spain–Communist Unity (PTE–UC)^{2}	5,082	0.86	−1.65	0	±0
People's Democratic Party (PDP)	988	0.17	New	0	±0
Humanist Platform (PH)	395	0.07	New	0	±0
Basque Social Democratic Party (PSDV)	249	0.04	New	0	±0
Blank ballots	6,404	1.08	+0.60		
Total	593,372			51	±0
Valid votes	593,372	99.07	+0.26		
Invalid votes	5,578	0.93	−0.26		
Votes cast / turnout	598,950	66.85	+1.29		
Abstentions	297,060	33.15	−1.29		
Registered voters	896,010				
Sources
Footnotes: ^{1} People's Alliance results are compared to People's Coalition totals in the 1983 election.; ^{2} Workers' Party of Spain–Communist Unity results are compared to Communist Party of the Basque Country totals in the 1983 election.

=== Guipúzcoa ===
← Summary of the 10 June 1987 General Assembly of Guipúzcoa election results →
Parties and alliances	Popular vote			Seats	
Parties and alliances	Votes	%	±pp	Total	+/−
Basque Solidarity (EA)	85,800	24.29	New	16	+16
Popular Unity (HB)	84,104	23.81	+4.62	14	+4
Socialist Party of the Basque Country (PSE–PSOE)	61,436	17.40	−5.49	9	−3
Basque Nationalist Party (EAJ/PNV)	50,139	14.20	−26.29	6	−19
Basque Country Left (EE)	40,577	11.49	+1.14	5	+2
People's Alliance (AP)^{1}	18,080	5.12	+0.97	1	±0
Democratic and Social Centre (CDS)	5,418	1.53	+1.21	0	±0
Workers' Party of Spain–Communist Unity (PTE–UC)^{2}	2,304	0.65	−0.99	0	±0
United Left (IU/EB)	1,842	0.52	New	0	±0
People's Democratic Party–Liberal Party (PDP–PL)	418	0.12	New	0	±0
Blank ballots	3,059	0.87	+0.11		
Total	353,177			51	±0
Valid votes	353,177	99.15	+0.41		
Invalid votes	3,026	0.85	−0.41		
Votes cast / turnout	356,203	68.16	+6.04		
Abstentions	166,358	31.84	−6.04		
Registered voters	522,561				
Sources
Footnotes: ^{1} People's Alliance results are compared to People's Coalition totals in the 1983 election.; ^{2} Workers' Party of Spain–Communist Unity results are compared to Communist Party of the Basque Country totals in the 1983 election.
