= 1983 Basque foral elections =

Elections in the Spanish region of the Basque Country

Foral elections were held in the Basque Country on 8 May 1983 to elect the 2nd General Assemblies of Álava, Biscay and Guipúzcoa. All 153 seats in the three General Assemblies were up for election. They were held concurrently with regional elections in thirteen autonomous communities and local elections all across Spain.

== Overall ==
← Summary of the 8 May 1983 Basque foral election results →
Parties and alliances	Popular vote			Seats	
Parties and alliances	Votes	%	±pp	Total	+/−
Basque Nationalist Party (EAJ/PNV)	395,885	39.56	+2.38	74	−25
Socialist Party of the Basque Country (PSE–PSOE)	263,436	26.32	+10.99	39	+7
Popular Unity (HB)	142,481	14.24	−3.72	20	−18
People's Coalition (AP–PDP–UL)^{1}	88,086	8.80	+8.75	14	+14
Basque Country Left (EE)	79,158	7.91	+0.75	6	−8
Communist Party of the Basque Country (PCE/EPK)	20,390	2.04	−2.43	0	−3
Democratic and Social Centre (CDS)	3,175	0.32	New	0	±0
Llodian Independent Group (AILL)	741	0.07	±0.00	0	±0
Communist League–Internationalist Socialist Workers' Coalition (LC (COSI))	724	0.07	New	0	±0
Revolutionary Communist League (LKI/LCR)	645	0.06	−0.61	0	±0
Union of the Democratic Centre (UCD)	n/a	n/a	−11.90	0	−32
Independents (INDEP)	n/a	n/a	−1.98	0	−10
Blank ballots	6,004	0.60	+0.14		
Total	1,000,725			153	−75
Valid votes	1,000,725	98.76	+0.07		
Invalid votes	12,577	1.24	−0.07		
Votes cast / turnout	1,013,302	64.59	+2.72		
Abstentions	555,505	35.41	−2.72		
Registered voters	1,568,807				
Sources
Footnotes: ^{1} People's Coalition results are compared to Foral Union of the Basque Country totals in the 1979 election.

Popular vote
EAJ/PNV	39.56%
PSE–PSOE	26.32%
HB	14.24%
AP–PDP–UL	8.80%
EE	7.91%
PCE/EPK	2.04%
Others	0.53%
Blank ballots	0.60%

== Deputation control ==
The following table lists party control in the foral deputations. Gains for a party are highlighted in that party's colour.

Province	Population	Previous control	New control
Álava	257,612	Basque Nationalist Party (EAJ/PNV)	Basque Nationalist Party (EAJ/PNV)
Biscay	1,227,299	Basque Nationalist Party (EAJ/PNV)	Basque Nationalist Party (EAJ/PNV)
Guipúzcoa	694,404	Basque Nationalist Party (EAJ/PNV)	Basque Nationalist Party (EAJ/PNV) (EA in 1986)

== Historical territories ==
=== Álava ===
← Summary of the 8 May 1983 General Assembly of Álava election results →
Parties and alliances	Popular vote			Seats	
Parties and alliances	Votes	%	±pp	Total	+/−
Basque Nationalist Party (EAJ/PNV)	45,657	37.11	+4.41	23	−3
Socialist Party of the Basque Country (PSE–PSOE)	34,890	28.36	+12.52	14	+7
People's Coalition (AP–PDP–UL)^{1}	19,147	15.56	+15.24	9	+9
Popular Unity (HB)	10,872	8.84	New	4	+4
Basque Country Left (EE)	7,571	6.15	+2.82	1	+1
Democratic and Social Centre (CDS)	2,163	1.76	New	0	±0
Communist Party of the Basque Country (PCE/EPK)	1,070	0.87	−2.25	0	±0
Llodian Independent Group (AILL)	741	0.60	+0.04	0	±0
Union of the Democratic Centre (UCD)	n/a	n/a	−25.03	0	−14
Independents (INDEP)	n/a	n/a	−16.63	0	−10
Blank ballots	920	0.75	+0.31		
Total	123,031			51	−6
Valid votes	123,031	98.56	−0.50		
Invalid votes	1,793	1.44	+0.50		
Votes cast / turnout	124,824	66.80	+1.45		
Abstentions	62,046	33.20	−1.45		
Registered voters	186,870				
Sources
Footnotes: ^{1} People's Coalition results are compared to Foral Union of the Basque Country totals in the 1979 election.

=== Biscay ===
← Summary of the 8 May 1983 General Assembly of Biscay election results →
Parties and alliances	Popular vote			Seats	
Parties and alliances	Votes	%	±pp	Total	+/−
Basque Nationalist Party (EAJ/PNV)	223,572	39.58	+0.16	26	−14
Socialist Party of the Basque Country (PSE–PSOE)	156,963	27.78	+12.45	13	±0
Popular Unity (HB)	71,582	12.67	−7.12	6	−13
People's Coalition (AP–PDP–UL)^{1}	55,962	9.91	+9.91	4	+4
Basque Country Left (EE)	39,229	6.94	+1.46	2	−2
Communist Party of the Basque Country (PCE/EPK)	14,181	2.51	−3.00	0	−3
Communist League–Internationalist Socialist Workers' Coalition (LC (COSI))	724	0.13	New	0	±0
Union of the Democratic Centre (UCD)	n/a	n/a	−11.13	0	−10
Blank ballots	2,711	0.48	−0.01		
Total	564,924			51	−39
Valid votes	564,924	98.81	+0.30		
Invalid votes	6,785	1.19	−0.30		
Votes cast / turnout	571,709	65.56	+4.26		
Abstentions	300,279	34.44	−4.26		
Registered voters	871,988				
Sources
Footnotes: ^{1} People's Coalition results are compared to Foral Union of the Basque Country totals in the 1979 election.

=== Guipúzcoa ===
← Summary of the 8 May 1983 General Assembly of Guipúzcoa election results →
Parties and alliances	Popular vote			Seats	
Parties and alliances	Votes	%	±pp	Total	+/−
Basque Nationalist Party (EAJ/PNV)	126,656	40.49	+5.46	25	−8
Socialist Party of the Basque Country (PSE–PSOE)	71,583	22.89	+7.74	12	±0
Popular Unity (HB)	60,027	19.19	−2.21	10	−9
Basque Country Left (EE)	32,358	10.35	−1.04	3	−7
People's Coalition (AP–PDP–UL)^{1}	12,977	4.15	+4.11	1	+1
Communist Party of the Basque Country (PCE/EPK)	5,139	1.64	−1.55	0	±0
Democratic and Social Centre (CDS)	1,012	0.32	New	0	±0
Revolutionary Communist League (LKI/LCR)	645	0.21	−0.61	0	±0
Union of the Democratic Centre (UCD)	n/a	n/a	−8.42	0	−7
Blank ballots	2,373	0.76	+0.33		
Total	312,770			51	−30
Valid votes	312,770	98.74	−0.11		
Invalid votes	3,999	1.26	+0.11		
Votes cast / turnout	316,769	62.12	+0.46		
Abstentions	193,180	37.88	−0.46		
Registered voters	509,949				
Sources
Footnotes: ^{1} People's Coalition results are compared to Foral Union of the Basque Country totals in the 1979 election.
