= Xabier Agirre =

Spanish politician (1951–2021)

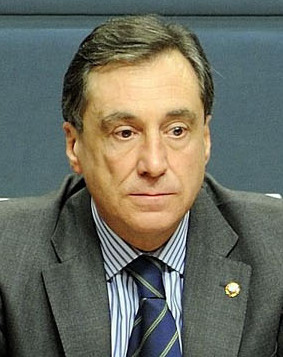
- Xabier Agirre in 2010

Deputy General of Álava
- In office 27 July 2007 – 7 July 2011
- Preceded by: Ramón Rabanera
- Succeeded by: Javier de Andrés

Member of the General Assembly of Álava
- In office 20 June 2007 – 2 January 2012
- Constituency: Vitoria-Gasteiz
- In office 19 July 1999 – 1 April 2003
- Constituency: Vitoria-Gasteiz
- In office 3 July 1987 – 18 September 1989

Member of the Basque Parliament
- In office 20 November 2012 – 2 August 2016
- Constituency: Álava
- In office 4 October 2005 – 21 September 2007
- Constituency: Álava
- In office 1 April 2004 – 22 February 2005
- Constituency: Álava

Personal details
- Born: Francisco Javier Aguirre López; 4 August 1951 Vitoria, Spain
- Died: 13 February 2021 (aged 69) Pamplona, Spain
- Party: EAJ/PNV

Xabier Agirre López (8 April 1951 – 13 February 2021) was a Spanish administrator and politician. A member of the Basque Nationalist Party, he held important institutional positions both in the Foral Deputation of Álava and in the Basque Parliament. He served as Deputy General of Álava from 2007 to 2011 and president of Araba Buru Batzar (the governing organ of the Basque Nationalist Party in Álava) from 1983 to 1987 and from 2012 to 2016.

== Biography ==
Xabier Agirre was born in Vitoria-Gasteiz in 1951. He worked in a local savings bank before entering politics. He joined the Basque Nationalist Party in the 1970s, being the head of the Álava branch from 1983 to 1987. That year he was elected to the General Assembly of Álava, in which he served until 1989. From 1990 to 1999, he served as deputy head of the Interior Department of the Basque Government under Juan María Atutxa.

He was the leading candidate of the Basque Nationalist Party in the 2007 election in Álava. Despite his party finishing third, he was unexpectedly elected Deputy General with the support of Eusko Alkartasuna due to the lack of an agreement between the Socialist Party and the People's Party. In late 2009, a corruption scandal broke out involving Alfredo de Miguel, a member of his government. Despite the local party organs having access to the case summary once it was made public, he didn't gain access to it, which strained the relation between the local party leadership and him.

His party finished second in the 2011 election, behind the People's Party. Despite having the support from Bildu, the abstention of Ezker Batua in the investiture vote meant that the PP-PSE-EE alliance had more votes, and thus Javier de Andrés was elected his successor. According to Agirre, Ezker Batua had demanded the naming of party members to public positions in exchange for their support.

From 2012 to 2016 he served as a member of the Basque Parliament and as head of the party in Álava. He died in Pamplona in 2021, aged 69.
