= Javier de Andrés =

Spanish politician (born 1967)

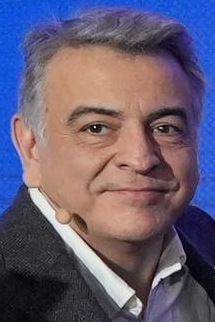
- De Andrés in 2024

President of the People's Party of the Basque Country
- Incumbent
- Assumed office 4 November 2023
- Preceded by: Carlos Iturgaiz

Delegate of the Government in the Basque Country
- In office 30 December 2016 – 18 June 2018
- Preceded by: Carlos Urquijo
- Succeeded by: Jesús Loza

Deputy General of Álava
- In office 7 July 2011 – 30 June 2015
- Preceded by: Xabier Agirre
- Succeeded by: Ramiro González

Member of the Basque Parliament
- In office 21 October 2016 – 31 December 2016
- Constituency: Álava

Member of the General Assembly of Álava
- In office 20 June 2007 – 30 December 2016
- Constituency: Vitoria-Gasteiz

Member of the Congress of Deputies
- In office 17 August 2023 – 14 March 2024
- Constituency: Álava

Personal details
- Born: Javier de Andrés Guerra; 3 October 1967 (age 58) Vitoria, Spain
- Party: People's Party of the Basque Country
- Other political affiliations: People's Party
- Spouse: Maria Loinaz Mendiguren
- Children: 3

Javier de Andrés Guerra (born 3 October 1967) is a Spanish politician. A member of the People's Party, he served as Deputy General of Álava from 2011 to 2015 and as Delegate of the Government in the Basque Country from 2016 to 2018. He was elected to the 15th Congress of Deputies in the 2023 Spanish general election representing Álava.

== Biography ==
Javier de Andrés was born in Vitoria-Gasteiz in 1967. He studied journalism at the University of the Basque Country, and later obtained a master's degree in finance. He entered politics in 1995, and from 1999 to 2004 he served in various posts in the Foral Deputation of Álava. He joined the government of Ramón Rabanera in 2004 as Foral Deputy for Public Works. He was the People's Party candidate for Deputy General in the 2007 election. Despite the People's Party obtaining the most seats in the General Assembly, Xabier Agirre of the Basque Nationalist Party was elected Deputy General.

He was elected Deputy General after the 2011 election with support from the Socialist Party. Despite leading the most voted candidacy again in 2015, he was succeeded by Ramiro González of the Basque Nationalist Party, whose party had obtained more seats in the General Assembly. He was elected in 2016 to the Basque Parliament. He resigned after less than three months when he was named Delegate of the Government in the Basque Country. He was dismissed in 2018 after the change in the central government, and substituted by Jesús Loza.

== See also ==
- List of members of the 15th Congress of Deputies
