= 1979 Basque foral elections =

Elections in the Spanish region of the Basque Country

Foral elections were held in the Basque Country on 3 April 1979 to elect the 1st General Assemblies of Álava, Biscay and Guipúzcoa. All 228 seats in the three General Assemblies were up for election. They were held concurrently with local elections all across Spain.

== Overall ==
Summary of the 3 April 1979 Basque foral election results →
Parties and alliances	Popular vote			Seats	
Parties and alliances	Votes	%	±pp	Total	+/−
Basque Nationalist Party (EAJ/PNV)	351,349	37.18	n/a	99	n/a
Popular Unity (HB)	169,653	17.96	n/a	38	n/a
Socialist Party of the Basque Country (PSE–PSOE)	144,880	15.33	n/a	32	n/a
Union of the Democratic Centre (UCD)	112,449	11.90	n/a	32	n/a
Basque Country Left (EE)	67,633	7.16	n/a	14	n/a
Communist Party of the Basque Country (PCE/EPK)	42,192	4.47	n/a	3	n/a
Communist Movement–Organization of Communist Left (EMK–OIC)	15,223	1.61	n/a	0	n/a
Workers' Revolutionary Organization (ORT)	7,936	0.84	n/a	0	n/a
Revolutionary Communist League (LKI/LCR)	6,325	0.67	n/a	0	n/a
Carlist Party (EKA/PC)	2,413	0.26	n/a	0	n/a
Llodian Independent Group (AILL)	628	0.07	n/a	0	n/a
Party of Labour of the Basque Country (PTE)	566	0.06	n/a	0	n/a
Foral Union of the Basque Country (UFPV)	505	0.05	n/a	0	n/a
Independents (INDEP)	18,749	1.98	n/a	10	n/a
Blank ballots	4,374	0.46	n/a		
Total	944,875			228	n/a
Valid votes	944,875	98.69	n/a		
Invalid votes	12,579	1.31	n/a		
Votes cast / turnout	957,454	61.87	n/a		
Abstentions	590,018	38.13	n/a		
Registered voters	1,547,472				

Popular vote
EAJ/PNV	37.18%
HB	17.96%
PSE–PSOE	15.33%
UCD	11.90%
EE	7.16%
PCE/EPK	4.47%
EMK–OIC	1.61%
Others	3.93%
Blank ballots	0.46%

== Deputation control ==
The following table lists party control in the foral deputations.

Province	Population	New control
Álava	248,605	Basque Nationalist Party (EAJ/PNV)
Biscay	1,208,988	Basque Nationalist Party (EAJ/PNV)
Guipúzcoa	707,968	Basque Nationalist Party (EAJ/PNV)

== Historical territories ==
=== Álava ===
Summary of the 3 April 1979 General Assembly of Álava election results →
Parties and alliances	Popular vote			Seats	
Parties and alliances	Votes	%	±pp	Total	+/−
Basque Nationalist Party (EAJ/PNV)	36,866	32.70	n/a	26	n/a
Union of the Democratic Centre (UCD)	28,215	25.03	n/a	14	n/a
Socialist Party of the Basque Country (PSE–PSOE)	17,860	15.84	n/a	7	n/a
Basque Country Left (EE)	3,754	3.33	n/a	0	n/a
Communist Party of the Basque Country (PCE/EPK)	3,512	3.12	n/a	0	n/a
Workers' Revolutionary Organization (ORT)	1,167	1.04	n/a	0	n/a
Communist Movement–Organization of Communist Left (EMK–OIC)	698	0.62	n/a	0	n/a
Llodian Independent Group (AILL)	628	0.56	n/a	0	n/a
Revolutionary Communist League (LKI/LCR)	429	0.38	n/a	0	n/a
Foral Union of the Basque Country (UFPV)	365	0.32	n/a	0	n/a
Independents (INDEP)	18,749	16.63	n/a	10	n/a
Blank ballots	491	0.44	n/a		
Total	112,734			57	n/a
Valid votes	112,734	99.06	n/a		
Invalid votes	1,069	0.94	n/a		
Votes cast / turnout	113,803	65.35	n/a		
Abstentions	60,342	34.65	n/a		
Registered voters	174,145				

=== Biscay ===
Summary of the 3 April 1979 General Assembly of Biscay election results →
Parties and alliances	Popular vote			Seats	
Parties and alliances	Votes	%	±pp	Total	+/−
Basque Nationalist Party (EAJ/PNV)	206,212	39.42	n/a	40	n/a
Popular Unity (HB)	103,507	19.79	n/a	19	n/a
Socialist Party of the Basque Country (PSE–PSOE)	80,200	15.33	n/a	13	n/a
Union of the Democratic Centre (UCD)	58,217	11.13	n/a	11	n/a
Communist Party of the Basque Country (PCE/EPK)	28,812	5.51	n/a	3	n/a
Basque Country Left (EE)	28,665	5.48	n/a	4	n/a
Communist Movement–Organization of Communist Left (EMK–OIC)	8,006	1.53	n/a	0	n/a
Revolutionary Communist League (LKI/LCR)	3,373	0.64	n/a	0	n/a
Workers' Revolutionary Organization (ORT)	2,948	0.56	n/a	0	n/a
Party of Labour of the Basque Country (PTE)	566	0.11	n/a	0	n/a
Foral Union of the Basque Country (UFPV)	2	0.00	n/a	0	n/a
Blank ballots	2,543	0.49	n/a		
Total	523,051			90	n/a
Valid votes	523,051	98.51	n/a		
Invalid votes	7,908	1.49	n/a		
Votes cast / turnout	530,959	61.30	n/a		
Abstentions	335,226	38.70	n/a		
Registered voters	866,185				

=== Guipúzcoa ===
Summary of the 3 April 1979 General Assembly of Guipúzcoa election results →
Parties and alliances	Popular vote			Seats	
Parties and alliances	Votes	%	±pp	Total	+/−
Basque Nationalist Party (EAJ/PNV)	108,271	35.03	n/a	33	n/a
Popular Unity (HB)	66,146	21.40	n/a	19	n/a
Socialist Party of the Basque Country (PSE–PSOE)	46,820	15.15	n/a	12	n/a
Basque Country Left (EE)	35,214	11.39	n/a	10	n/a
Union of the Democratic Centre (UCD)	26,017	8.42	n/a	7	n/a
Communist Party of the Basque Country (PCE/EPK)	9,868	3.19	n/a	0	n/a
Communist Movement–Organization of Communist Left (EMK–OIC)	6,519	2.11	n/a	0	n/a
Workers' Revolutionary Organization (ORT)	3,821	1.24	n/a	0	n/a
Revolutionary Communist League (LKI/LCR)	2,523	0.82	n/a	0	n/a
Carlist Party (EKA/PC)	2,413	0.78	n/a	0	n/a
Foral Union of the Basque Country (UFPV)	138	0.04	n/a	0	n/a
Blank ballots	1,340	0.43	n/a		
Total	309,090			81	n/a
Valid votes	309,090	98.85	n/a		
Invalid votes	3,602	1.15	n/a		
Votes cast / turnout	312,692	61.66	n/a		
Abstentions	194,450	38.34	n/a		
Registered voters	507,142				
