= General Assembly of Álava =

Parliament in Spain

Coordinates: 42°50′49.99″N 02°40′32.02″W

General Assemblies of Álava Arabako Batzar Nagusiak (Basque) Juntas Generales de Álava (Spanish)

Type
- Type: Spanish regional legislature
- Houses: Unicameral

Leadership
- President: Irma Basterra, EAJ-PNV since 19 June 2023

Structure
- Seats: 51
- Political groups: Government (24): EAJ-PNV (15); PSE–EE (9); Opposition (27): EH Bildu (14); PP (9); Elkarrekin Podemos (3); Vox (1)

Elections
- Voting system: Party-list proportional representation, D'Hondt method
- Last election: 28 May 2023

Meeting place
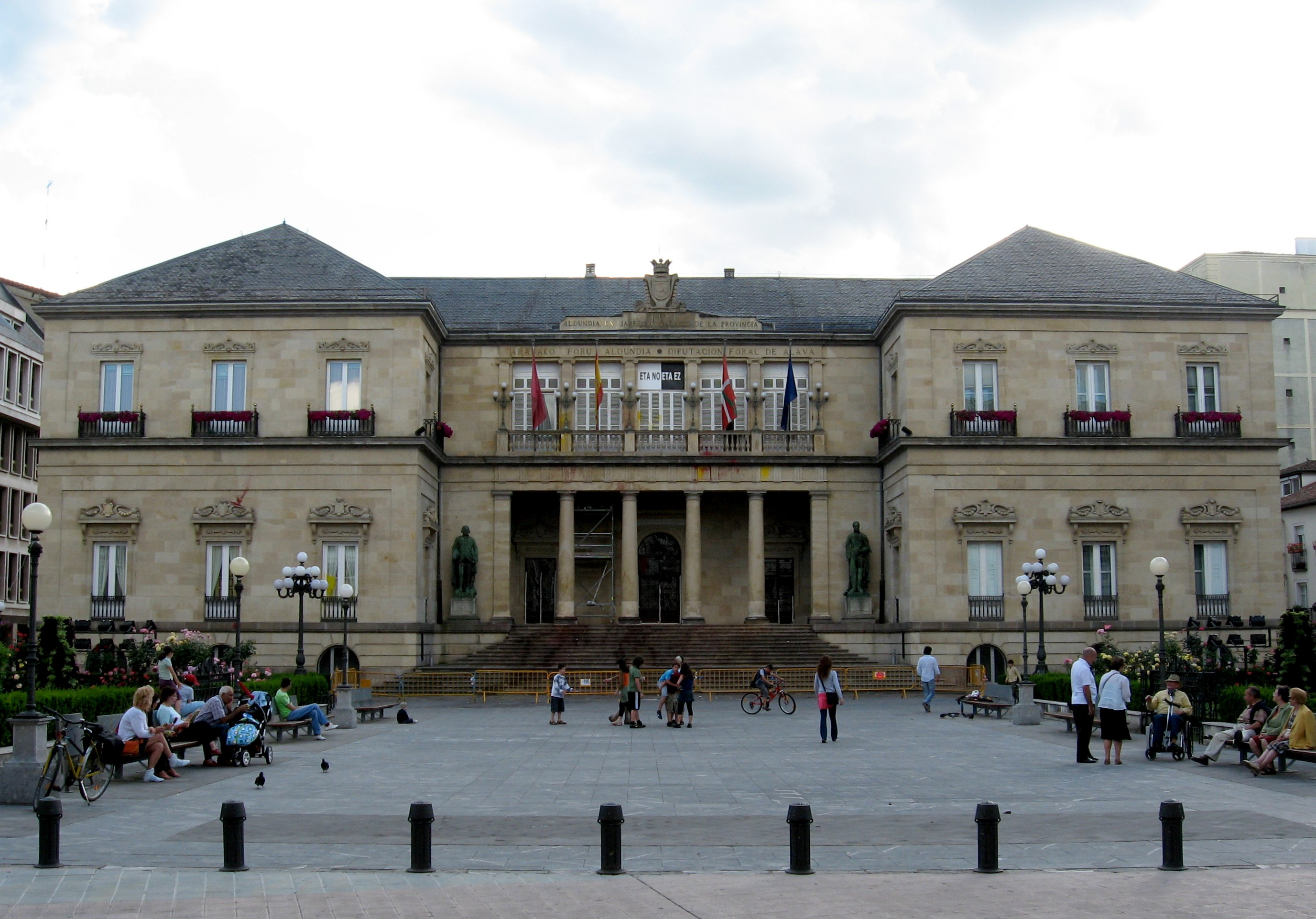
- Province Palace, Vitoria-Gasteiz

Website
- www.jjggalava.eus

The General Assemblies of Álava (in Basque: Arabako Batzar Nagusiak, in Spanish: Juntas Generales de Álava) are the parliament of Álava, a province of Spain and a historical territory of the Basque Country.

The General Assemblies are integrated by 51 members for a period of four years. The General Assembly meets at the Province Palace in Vitoria-Gasteiz.

== Functions ==
Among the powers of the General Assemblies are:

- Approval of chartered rules, through which matters in which the province has competences are regulated. When it comes to exclusive powers of the province, these regional regulations have rank equivalent to law. Among the matters in which Álava has exclusive powers are the operation of chartered bodies such as the Provincial Council or the General Assembly themselves; the budgets and accounts of Álava, the sector plans, the tax regime, the tax and financing regime of the town councils, provincial and local assets and local demarcations.
- Election of the General Deputy of Álava, who is the head of the government of the province.
- Approval of the budgets of the province.
- Monitor and develop the activity of the Provincial Council.

== Election ==
The General Assemblies have 51 members, elected by proportional representation for each constituency, which in this case corresponds to the comarcas of the province. 39 members are returned for Vitoria-Gasteiz, which contains the largest municipality of the province. Five members are returned for Ayala, and seven for Tierras Esparsas, which contains the five remanining comarcas: Gorbeialdea, Llanada Alavesa, Añana, Montaña Alavesa and Rioja Alavesa. A threshold of the 3% is established for having any seats.

Elections to General Assembly are called by the General Deputy (in Spanish: Diputado General). The election date and period from calling elections to polling day always coincide with local election periods.

Candidates to General Assembly are subject to the same requirements as those presenting their candidatures to other elections: i.e., to the stipulations of the Spanish law governing elections. Candidates are announced 27 days after the call to elections, provided of course they comply with the regulations. The campaign begins 38 days after elections are announced, by which time the political parties have to provide their lists of candidates. The campaign lasts 15 days and ends at midnight on the penultimate day before polling.

== Presidents of the General Assembly ==
The President of the General Assembly of Álava is the presiding officer of that legislature.

| Name | Term of office | | | Legislature (election) | Political Party |
| Name | Took office | Left office | Days | Legislature (election) | Political Party |
|---|---|---|---|---|---|
| Emilio Guevara Saleta | 7 May 1979 | 16 February 1980 | 285 | I (1979) | Basque Nationalist Party |
| Francisco José Ormazábal Zamakona | 16 February 1980 | 23 May 1983 | 2418 | I (1979) | Basque Nationalist Party |
| Francisco José Ormazábal Zamakona | 24 May 1983 | 30 September 1986 | 2418 | II (1983) | Basque Nationalist Party |
| Juan José Ibarretxe Markuartu | 30 September 1986 | 3 July 1987 | 1730 | II (1983) | Basque Nationalist Party |
| Juan José Ibarretxe Markuartu | 3 July 1987 | 26 June 1991 | 1730 | III (1987) | Basque Nationalist Party |
| Juan Pastor Álvarez | 17 June 1991 | 22 June 1995 | 1466 | IV (1991) | Socialist Party of the Basque Country |
| José Manuel López de Juan Abad | 22 June 1995 | 3 April 1999 | 1381 | V (1995) | Independent |
| Mikel Martínez Martínez de Lizarduy | 12 April 1999 | 6 July 1999 | 85 | V (1995) | Basque Nationalist Party |
| Xesqui Castañer López | 6 July 1999 | 13 June 2003 | 1438 | VI (1999) | Socialist Party of the Basque Country–Basque Country Left |
| María Teresa Rodríguez Barahona | 13 June 2003 | 22 June 2007 | 1470 | VII (2003) | Socialist Party of the Basque Country–Basque Country Left |
| Juan Antonio Zárate Pérez de Arrilucea | 20 June 2007 | 15 June 2011 | 2920 | VIII (2007) | People's Party of the Basque Country |
| Juan Antonio Zárate Pérez de Arrilucea | 15 June 2011 | 18 June 2015 | 2920 | IX (2011) | People's Party of the Basque Country |
| Pedro Ignacio Elósegui González de Gamarra | 18 June 2015 | 14 June 2019 | 2923 | X (2015) | Basque Nationalist Party |
| Pedro Ignacio Elósegui González de Gamarra | 14 June 2019 | 19 June 2023 | 2923 | XI (2019) | Basque Nationalist Party |
| Irma María Basterra Ugarriza | 19 June 2023 | Incumbent | 643 | XII (2023) | Basque Nationalist Party |

=== Results of the elections to the General Assembly of Álava ===
Members in the General Assembly of Álava
Key to parties HB EH EAE/ANV Bildu EH Bildu IU/EB EB–B Irabazi Podemos Elkarrekin Podemos EE PSE PSE–EE EA EAJ-PNV PNV–EA UCD CDS Cs CP AP PP UA Vox Independent
| Election | Distribution | General Deputy |
| 1979 | 7 / 10 / 26 / 14 | Emilio Guevara (EAJ-PNV) |
| 1983 | 4 / 1 / 14 / 23 / 9 | Juan María Ollora (EAJ-PNV) |
| 1987 | 8 / 3 / 11 / 12 / 10 / 3 / 4 | Fernando Buesa (PSE) |
| 1991 | 7 / 2 / 11 / 3 / 14 / 3 / 11 | Alberto Ansola (EAJ-PNV) |
| 1995 | 4 / 3 / 7 / 4 / 15 / 9 / 9 | Félix Ormazabal (EAJ-PNV) |
| 1999 | 6 / 2 / 9 / 16 / 16 / 2 | Ramón Rabanera (PP) |
| 2003 | 3 / 12 / 19 / 16 / 1 | Ramón Rabanera (PP) |
| 2007 | 4 / 2 / 14 / 2 / 14 / 15 | Xabier Agirre (EAJ-PNV) |
| 2011 | 11 / 2 / 9 / 13 / 16 | Javier de Andrés (PP) |
| 2015 | 11 / 1 / 8 / 5 / 13 / 1 / 12 | Ramiro González (EAJ-PNV) |
| 2019 | 12 / 4 / 10 / 17 / 8 | Ramiro González (EAJ-PNV) |
| 2023 | 14 / 3 / 9 / 15 / 9 / 1 | Ramiro González (EAJ-PNV) |

== Sources ==
- Official website
- All members of the General Assembly
