= Fernando Buesa =

Spanish politician in the Basque Christian Democracy (1946–2000)

Vice Lehendakari for Social Affairs
- In office 4 October 1991 – 4 January 1995
- Lehendakari: José Antonio Ardanza
- Preceded by: Jon Imanol Azúa (Vice Lehendakari)
- Succeeded by: Post abolished

Head of the Department of Education, Universities and Research
- In office 4 October 1991 – 4 January 1995
- Lehendakari: José Antonio Ardanza
- Preceded by: Inaxio Oliveri
- Succeeded by: Inaxio Oliveri

Deputy General of Álava
- In office 17 July 1987 – 17 July 1991
- Preceded by: Juan María Ollora
- Succeeded by: Alberto Ansola

Member of the Basque Parliament
- In office 22 March 1984 – 22 February 2000
- Constituency: Álava

Member of the General Assembly of Álava
- In office 24 May 1983 – 22 February 2000
- Constituency: Vitoria-Gasteiz

Personal details
- Born: Fernando Buesa Blanco; May 29, 1946 Bilbao, Spain
- Died: February 22, 2000 (aged 53) Vitoria-Gasteiz, Spain
- Manner of death: Assassination

Fernando Buesa Blanco (29 May 1946 – 22 February 2000) was a Spanish politician in the Basque Christian Democracy and in the Socialist Party of the Basque Country–Basque Country Left (PSE-EE) branch of the social democratic Spanish Socialist Workers' Party (PSOE). He was assassinated by ETA.

== Biography ==
Born in 1946 in Bilbao, Spain, Buesa studied law in Madrid and Barcelona and practiced from 1970 to 1986 in Vitoria-Gasteiz. He served in the Vitoria-Gasteiz city council from 1983 to 1997, in the Basque Parliament from 1984 to 2000 and as Deputy General of Álava from 1987 to 1991. Buesa was also vice lehendakari (president of the Basque government) and minister of Education in a coalition PSE-Basque Nationalist Party Basque government from 1991 to 1994.

From this position, he steered the process that moved the Basque-language schools (ikastolak) into either the Basque public education network or the Basque chartered private education sector.

Fernando Buesa was married and had three children.

== Death and legacy ==
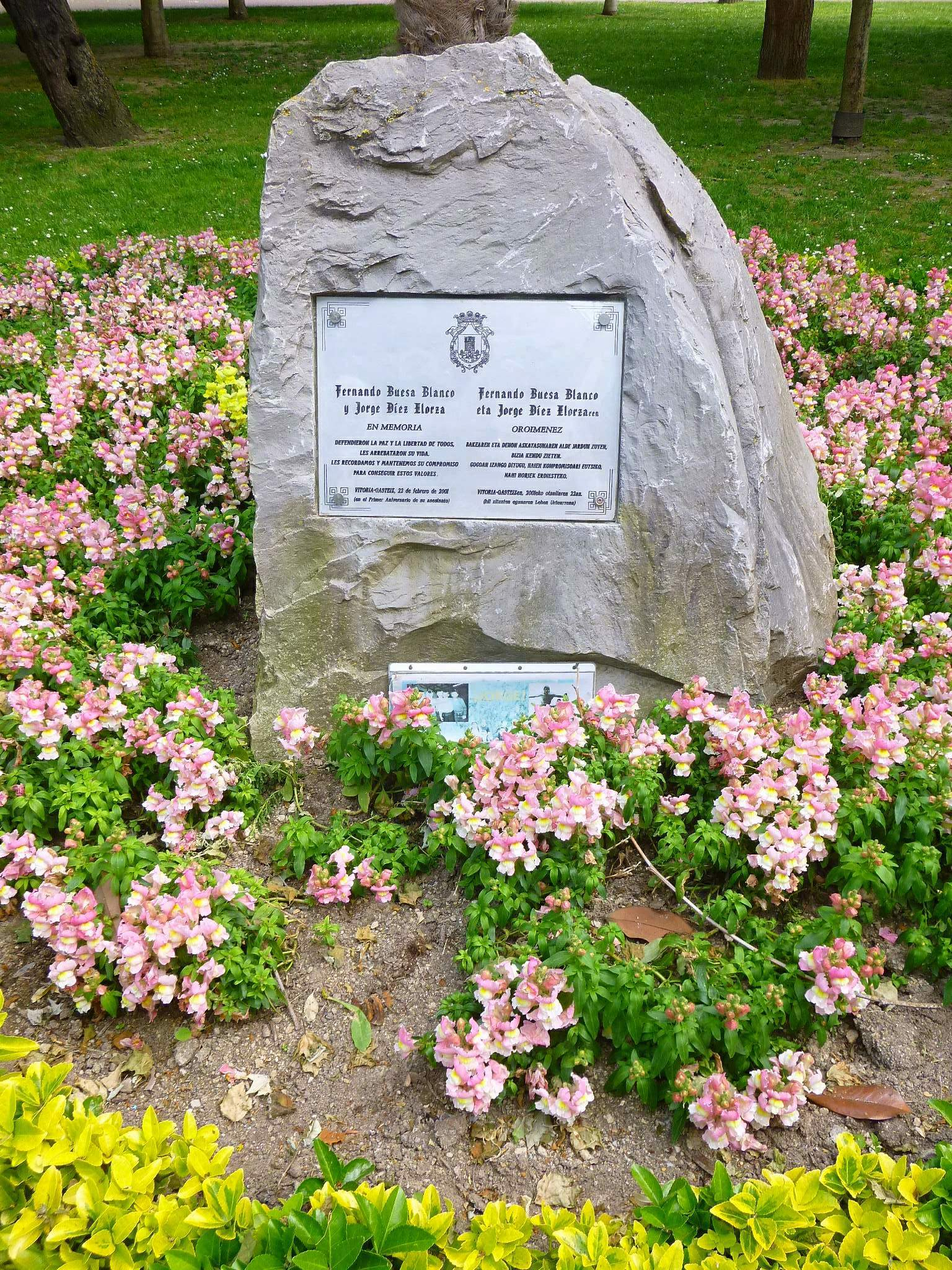
Memorial to Fernando Buesa at the site of his assassination.

On February 22, 2000, Buesa was killed by the separatist group ETA while he was walking through the university campus in Vitoria-Gasteiz. The car bombing also killed his bodyguard, the ertzaina (member of the Basque police) Jorge Díez Elorza.

At the time of his death, Buesa was the leader of the PSE-EE in Álava and the PSE-EE spokesman in the Basque Parliament.

His assassination inspired a well received documentary by the Basque filmmaker Eterio Ortega titled Asesinato en febrero.

The home arena of the Vitoria-Gasteiz Baskonia basketball team, formerly known as Araba Arena, was renamed Fernando Buesa Arena after his death.

== Honours ==
- Civil Order of Alfonso X the Wise, Grand Cross, 25 February 2005 (posthumous)

== See also ==
- List of unsolved murders (2000–present)
