= Emilio Guevara =

Spanish politician

Deputy General of Álava
- In office 7 May 1979 – 29 May 1983
- Preceded by: Cayetano Ezquerra (as President of the Deputation)
- Succeeded by: Juan María Ollora

Member of the General Assembly of Álava
- In office 13 June 2003 – 18 April 2005
- Constituency: Tierras Esparsas
- In office 7 May 1979 – 1983

Member of the Basque Parliament
- In office 7 June 2005 – 27 January 2006
- Constituency: Álava
- In office 8 January 1987 – 6 October 1987
- Constituency: Álava
- In office 31 March 1980 – 19 January 1984
- Constituency: Biscay

Personal details
- Born: Emilio Guevara Saleta; 14 September 1941 (age 84) Vitoria, Spain
- Party: Independent
- Other political affiliations: EAJ/PNV (until 2002)

Emilio Guevara Saleta (born 14 September 1941) is a Spanish politician. He served as Deputy General of Álava from 1979 to 1983, the first officeholder since the abolition of the post in 1877. Originally a member of the Basque Nationalist Party, he was expelled from the party in 2002. Since then, he has been an independent politician linked to the Socialist Party of the Basque Country.

== Biography ==
He was born in Vitoria in 1941. His siblings Juan Ramón and Javier have also been active in politics. He studied law, graduating in 1964, and joined the Basque Nationalist Party in the 1970s.

In 1979 he was elected a member of the General Assembly of Álava and subsequently as Deputy General, an office he held until 1983. In 1980 he was elected to the first Basque Parliament for Biscay, due to the law preventing him from running in Álava. He served as the spokesman of the party in the Basque Parliament during its first term, due to him being considered one of the key figures behind the Statute of Autonomy. He didn't stand for reelection neither for Deputy General nor for member of the Basque Parliament in 1983 and 1984 respectively. He was elected to the Basque Parliament again in 1986, but resigned after less than a year.

In the year 2000, he wrote an opinion piece in Deia criticizing Xabier Arzalluz and the sovereigntist strategy of the Basque Nationalist Party, which caused some members to ask for his expulsion. One of the most prominent party members to support him was longtime mayor of Vitoria-Gasteiz José Ángel Cuerda. He was finally expelled from the party in early 2002.

Later that year he announced he would stand for election to the General Assembly of Álava. Despite running in the PSE-EE list, he refused to become a party member. During the campaign of the 2003 election and afterwards, he strongly criticized Lehendakari Juan José Ibarretxe and his plan towards political sovereignty. In 2005, he was named as the leading candidate of the Socialist Party for Álava in that year's election to the Basque Parliament, while remaining an independent. He resigned from the Basque Parliament in early 2006 and left political life.

== Honours ==
- Medal of the Order of Constitutional Merit, 5 December 2003
