= Araia, Álava =

Coordinates: 42°53′23″N 2°18′57″W

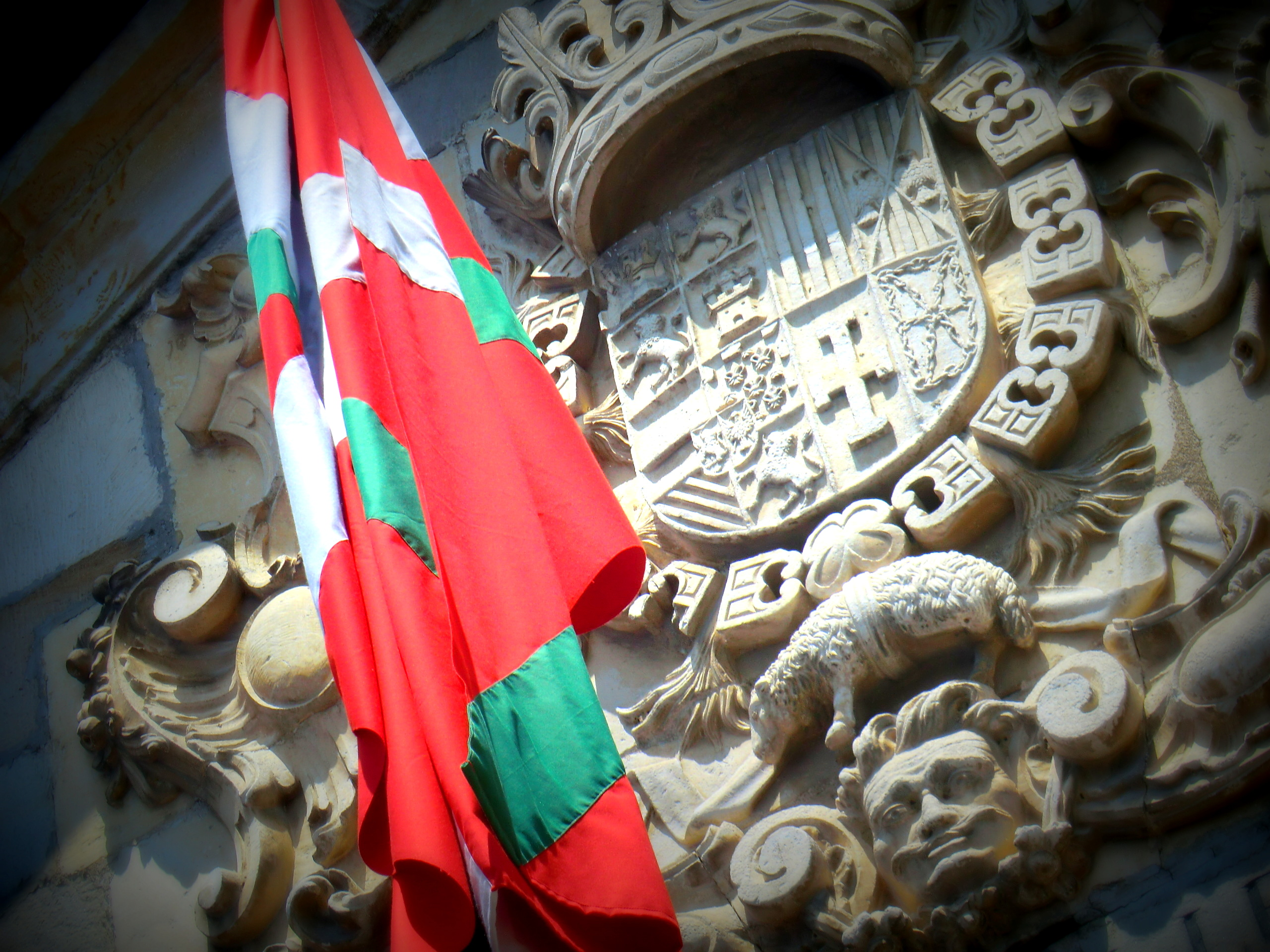
Coat of arms on the City Hall facade

Araia is a village in the province of Álava, Basque Country, Spain. It is the capital of the municipality of Asparrena. It has a population of 1,218 inhabitants (2006) and has an altitude of 604 meters. One of medieval roads from the port of San Adrián to the Plains of Alava passed through Araia. It was an important pilgrimage and trade route.

== Description ==
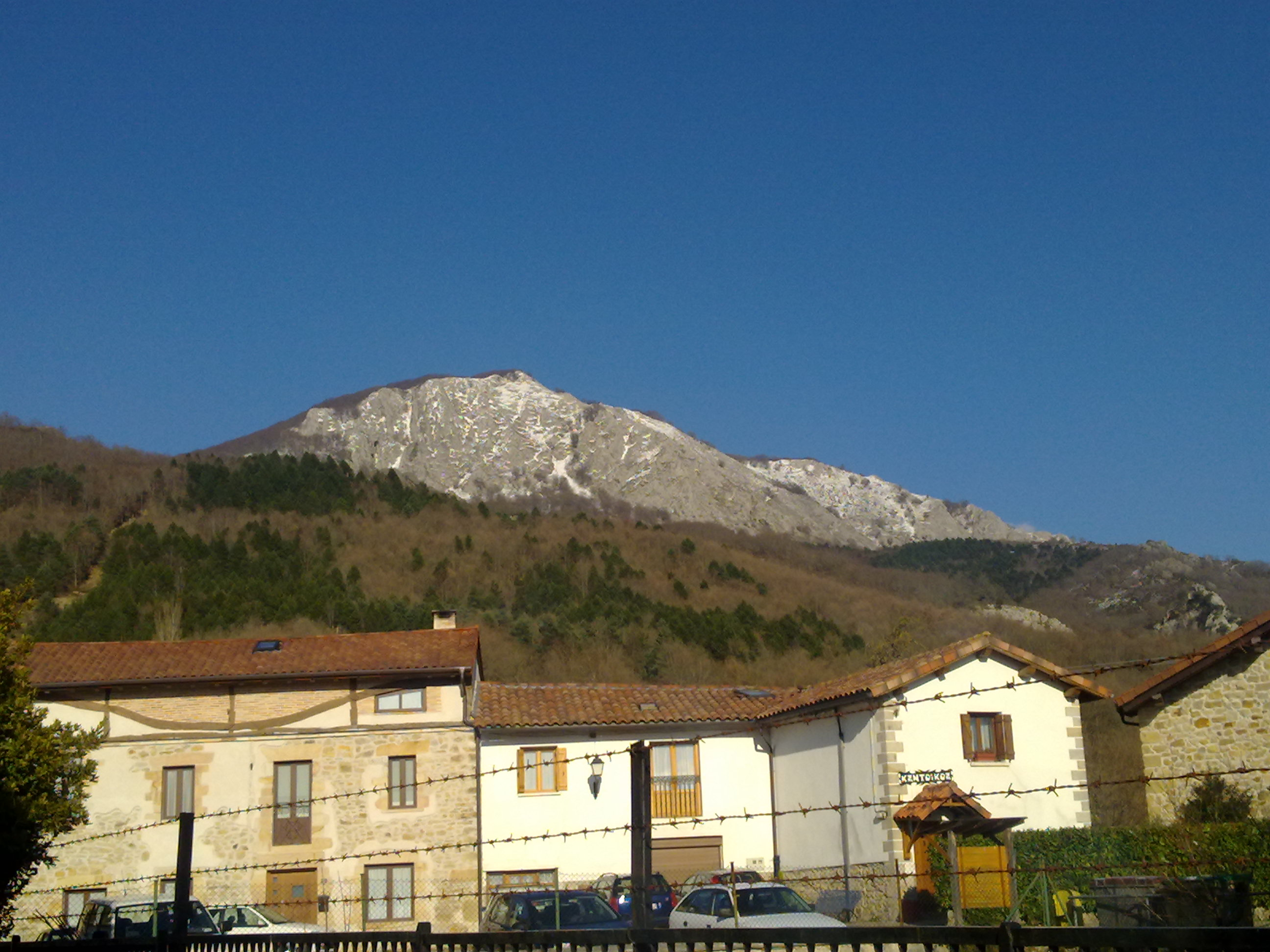
Umandia

Araia is a starting point for mountaineers who ascend to the nearby Altzaina and Entzia mountains. Near to Araia there are the Ilarduia and Egino climbing schools. The Leze Provincial Park are worth admiring. Here is a ravine of the caves of the same name and the entire Peñas de Egino area in which the most authentic climbing school in Álava is located. Also important for the village is the natural landscape of the river Zirauntza, which was one of the incentives for establishing in the village, along with the Santa Ana Bolueta of Bilbao, the first Basque steelworks.

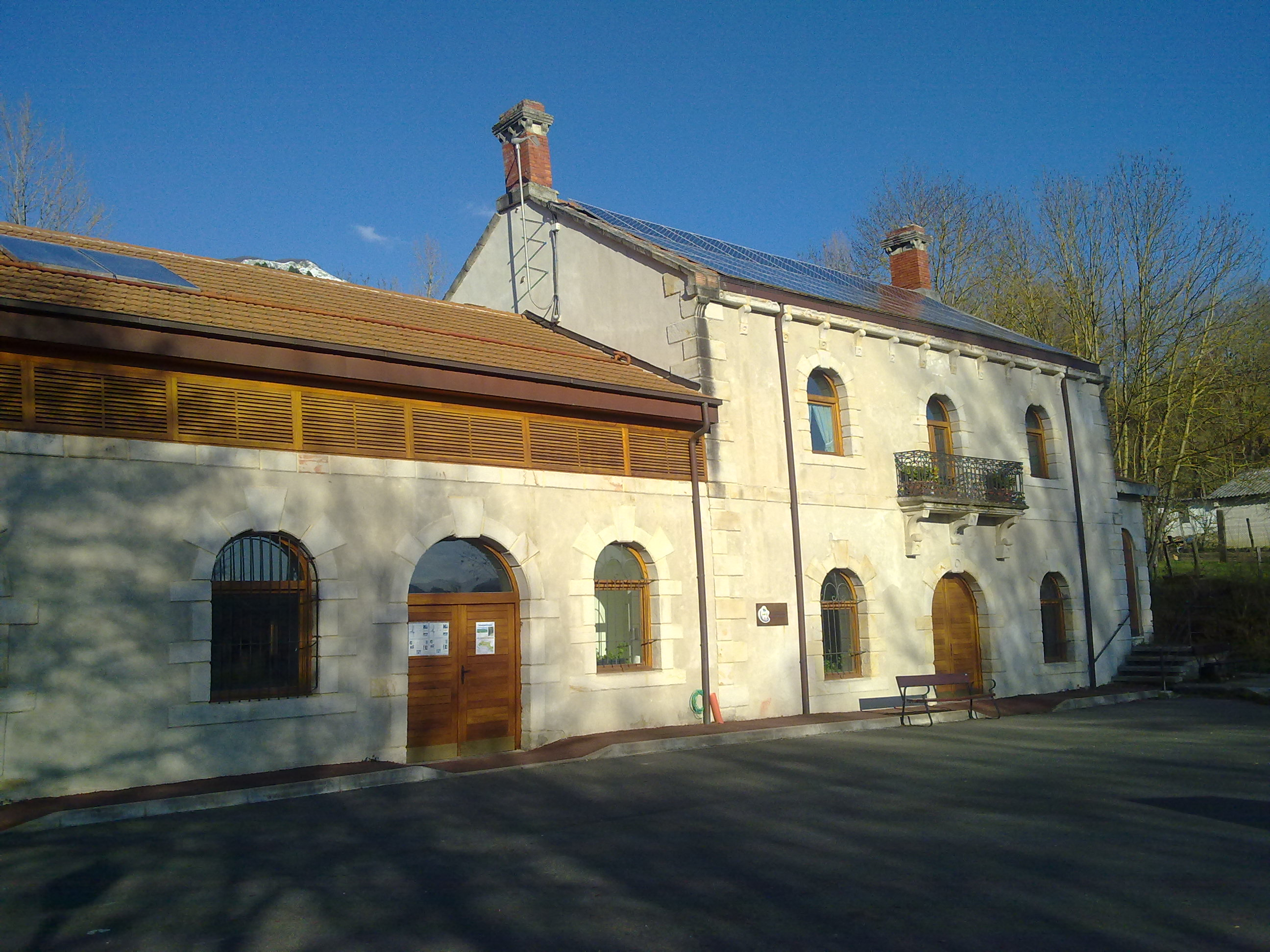
Mitxarro Home-Museum

== Famous people ==
- Germán María Landazabal y Galarza (1884–1952). Musician. Migrated to Argentina where he dedicated 30 year to teaching music and composition.
- Andoni Urrestarazu "Umandi" (1902–1993). Advocate of the Basque language. Persecuted in Francoist Spain, he was exiled to France. He wrote "Gramática Vasca: Método para aprender y enseñar el idioma vasco" (Basque Grammar: Method of teaching and learning the Basque language).
- Jesús Moraza, Bishop emeritus of Labrea (Brazil).
- Félix Ormazabal Ascacibar Advisor to the Basque Government, President of the Araba Buru Batzar and Deputy General of Álava in 1995
- Javier Alkorta "Txortas" (1957): stage actor and director of the Araia Humorous Theatre Festival.
- José Luis Ruiz de Gordoa (1957): musician, composer, instructor. Member of the Joselu Anayak group. The Ruiz de Gordoa brothers (Javier, Joselu, Andoni, Félix and Jesús) formed the band in 1978 and they have performed in all the villages throughout Álava, Guipúzcoa, Vizcaya, Navarra and Iparralde.

== Events ==
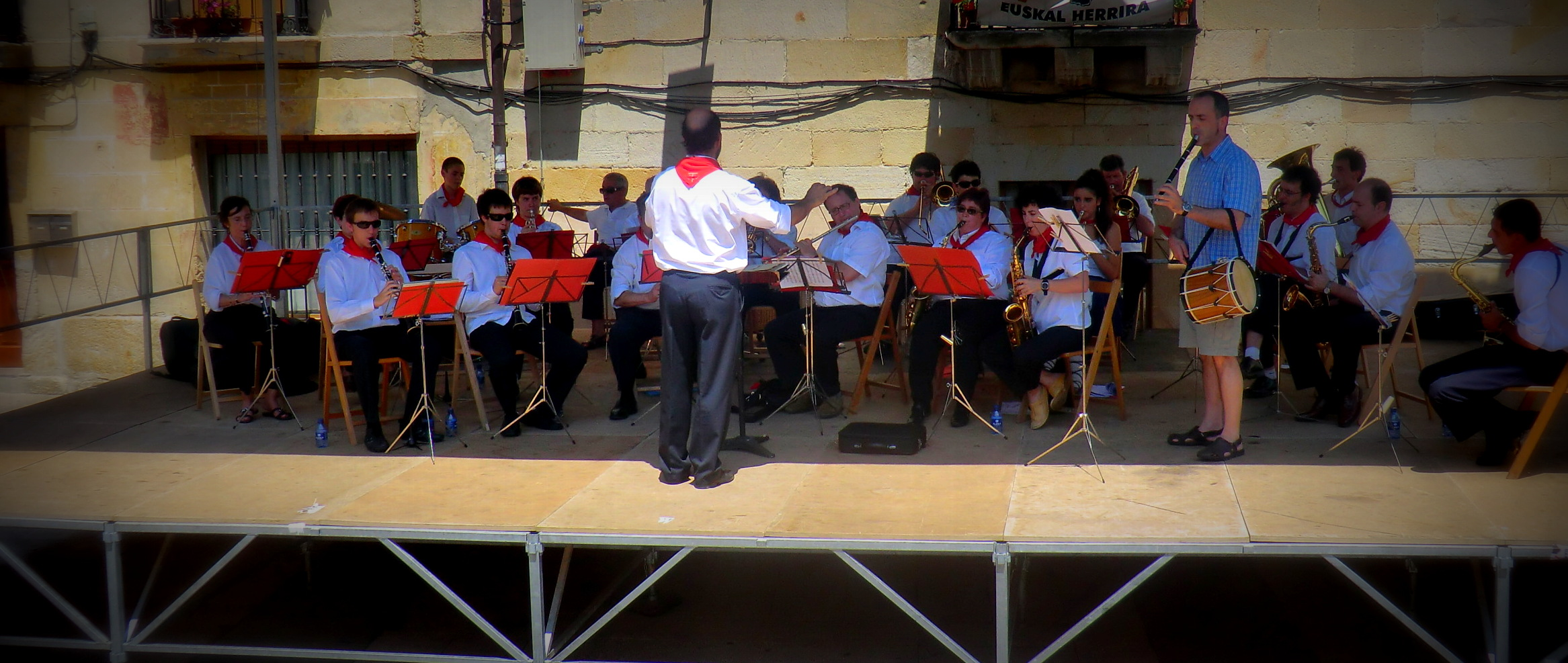
Araia Municipal band

One of the events that taint Araia history is what happened on the morning of August 17, 1961, when one of the blast furnaces at the Araia plant exploded, sweeping away the lives of several young people who worked in the town. For the 50th anniversary, on August 17, 2011, the villagers performed a tribute to those killed in the Ajuria Urigoitia factory placing, in the Araia meadow, one of the wagons that were used in the factory. They placed it on a block of limestone in the quarry of the village. The municipal band and Araia choir performed at the ceremony.

== Links of interest ==
- Official web page of the Humor and Theatre Festival
- End of year musical Video
- Official website of Alipendi C.D
- Araia Dairy
- Joselu Anayak- "Ay Anselma"
