= Department of Education, Language policy and Culture =

The Department of Education, Language policy and Culture (Basque: Eusko Jaurlaritzako Hezkuntza, Hizkuntza Politika eta Kultura Saila; Spanish: Departamento de Educación, Política Lingüística y Cultura) is the department of the Basque Government responsible for the community's education system and its policies regarding the Basque language and Basque culture.

== Ministers ==
Basque General Council
1978-1980: Karlos Santamaria
Restoration of democracy
1980-1984: Pedro Miguel Etxenike
1984-1985: Juan Urrutia
1985-1987: Juan Txurruka
1987-1991: Jose Ramon Rekalde
1991: Inaxio Oliveri
1991-1995: Fernando Buesa
1995-2001: Inaxio Oliveri
2001-2005: Anjeles Iztueta
2005-2009: Tontxu Campos
2009-2012: Isabel Zelaa
2012-2015: Cristina Uriarte
2015-present: Alfonso Morais
