= Department of Environment and Regional Policy =

The Department of Environment and Regional Policy (Basque: Eusko Jaurlaritzako Ingurumen eta Lurralde Politika Saila; Spanish: Departamento de Medio Ambiente y Política Territorial}) is the department of the Basque Government responsible for the community's environment, urban planning and all forms of transport.

== Ministers ==
Exile
1936-1979: Gonzalo Nardiz
Basque General Council
1978-1980: Juan Ajuriagerra (regional planning and environment) and Mikel Isasi (fisheries)
Restoration of democracy
1980-1984: Felix Ormazabal (agriculture) and Xabier Lasagabazter (regional planning, fisheries)
1984-1985: Felix Ormazabal (agriculture and fishing) and Castor Garate (regional planning)
1985-1987: Felix Ormazabal (agriculture and fishing) and Jose Ramon Estonba (regional planning)
1987-1991: Felix Ormazabal (agriculture and fishing) and Jose Miguel Martin (environment)
1991-1995: Jose Manuel Goikoetxea (agriculture and fishing) and Jon Larrinaga (environment)
1995-1998: Javier Retegi (agriculture and fishing) and Francisco Jose Ormazabal (regional planning and environment)
1998-2001: Iñaki Gerenabarrena (agriculture and fishing) and Francisco Jose Ormazabal (regional planning and environment)
2001-2005: Gonzalo Saenz de Samaniego (agriculture and fishing) and Sabin Intxaurraga (regional planning and environment)
2005-2009: Gonzalo Saenz de Samaniego (agriculture, fishing and Elikadura) and Esther Larrañaga (regional planning and environment)
2009-2012: Pilar Unzalu (environment, regional planning, agriculture and fishing)
2012-present: Ana Oregi (environment and Lurralde Politika)
