= Deputy General of Álava =

Head of government of Álava, Spain

- Arabako ahaldun nagusia (Basque); Diputado General de Álava (Spanish)
- Coat of arms of the Deputy General

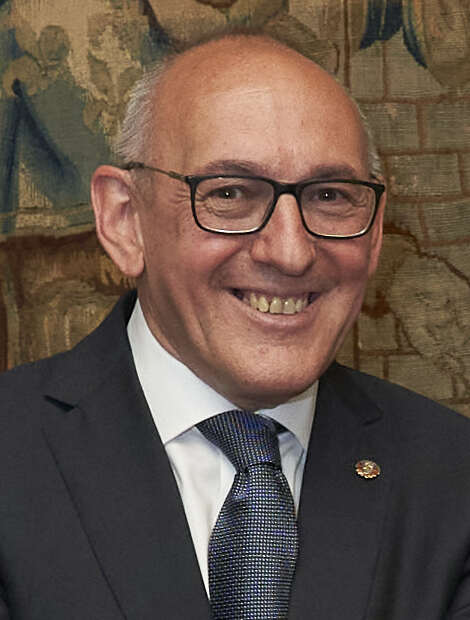
- Incumbent; Ramiro González since 30 June 2015
- Nominator: General Assembly of Álava
- Term length: Four years
- Inaugural holder: Lope López de Ayala
- Formation: c. 1476
- Salary: €97,970 per annum

The deputy general of Álava (Basque: Arabako ahaldun nagusia, Spanish: Diputado General de Álava) is the head of the Foral Deputation of Álava, a province of the Basque Country, Spain. The current incumbent is Ramiro González of the Basque Nationalist Party, who has held the office since 2015.

The post has existed since the late fifteenth century. The first three Deputies General were selected by the monarch, but all their successors were elected by representatives of the province. The importance of the post increased gradually during the eighteenth century, while that of the Juntas Generales weakened. With the end of Basque home rule in Spain in 1876, the Foral Deputation of Álava was denoted to the status of a provincial deputation, and the name of the post changed to president of the Deputation of Álava (Basque: Arabako Aldundiaren presidentea, Spanish: Presidente de la Diputación de Álava). After the approval of the Constitution of 1978, the Foral Deputation was restored and the post of deputy general were restored. The first officeholder of the restored post was Emilio Guevara, elected in 1979.

== History ==
In 1476, the Santa Hermandad, a paramilitary peacekeeping force operating in Castille was founded. The Hermandad of Álava took part in the Santa Hermandad, and sent a representative to its general council. The Santa Hermandad was dissolved as a country-wide force in 1498 due to its high cost, but the authorities from Álava petitioned the Catholic Monarchs to keep the representative as head of the Juntas Generales and the Junta Particular of Álava. The first officeholder, Lope López de Ayala, resigned in 1501 due to his advanced age, and was succeeded by Diego Martínez de Álava. Upon his death in 1533, the different local authorities disagreed on his successor, so the monarch appointed Martín Martínez de Bermeo on an interim basis.

In 1534, an agreement between was reached between the authorities of Álava and Vitoria (the main city in the province) regarding the election of the General Deputy. The election was decided by the votes of three representatives of Álava and three of Vitoria, with a draw being carried out if the result was a tie. The elected deputy general then served for a three-year term. The powers of the deputy general varied over time, but during the eighteenth century they grew while the Juntas Generales became weaker.

This system remained in place until the end of Basque home rule in Spain in 1876, with a law passed on 21 July of that year. Domingo Martínez de Aragón, deputy general at the time, refused to dissolve the foral institutions in Álava, and instead resigned. He was briefly succeeded by Julio Bravo, who was finally removed from the post in late 1877.

After 1877, the status of Álava became that of a normal province of Spain. The main administrative body was the provincial deputation, with the President of the Deputation as its head. In 1936, deputy general Teodoro Olarte was removed from the post after the coup attempt that started the civil war, he was later shot by the Nationalist forces. Lorenzo de Cura was the longest serving President of the Deputation during the Francoist period, from 1944 to 1958.

When the Constitution of 1978 became effective, the Foral Deputation and concurrently the post of deputy general were restored. After the first election to the Juntas Generales in 1979, Emilio Guevara was elected deputy general. In 1980, the post of President of the Juntas Generales was created, thus separating the offices of head of the provincial government and parliament. Ramiro González is the current deputy general, first elected in 2015.

== Election ==
The deputy general is elected by the Juntas Generales after each election, taking place every four years. The 1979 election was indirect, but in all other elections since 1983 the Juntas Generales have been chosen directly by popular vote. After the Juntas Generales have been constituted, the political parties represented in them can nominate candidates to the post. The candidate receiving an absolute majority of the votes in the first round of voting is elected deputy general. If no candidate obtains an absolute majority, a second round of voting is conducted, in which the candidate who receives the most votes is elected.

=== Oath of office ===
Shortly after being elected, the new deputy general takes the oath of office in Spanish and/or Basque:

Juro [prometo] defender los Fueros, buenos usos y costumbres de Álava, signo de autogobierno y libertad, en aumento de la Justicia.
Zin [agintzen] dut Arabako Foruen, erabilera onen eta ohituren alde egingo dudala, autogobernuaren eta askatasunaren ikurrak baitira, Justizia areagotzeko.
I swear [promise] that I will defend the Fueros, good practices and customs of Álava, symbols of self-government and freedom, for the benefit of Justice.

During the ceremony, the deputy general is escorted by the maceros and txistularis. After taking the oath, the President of the Juntas Generales hands the new deputy general the staff of office, and an aurresku is performed in his honor.

== See also ==
- List of deputies general of Álava
