= Albéniz, Álava =

Albéniz Albeiz (in Basque)
- Concejo
- Albeiz/Albéniz
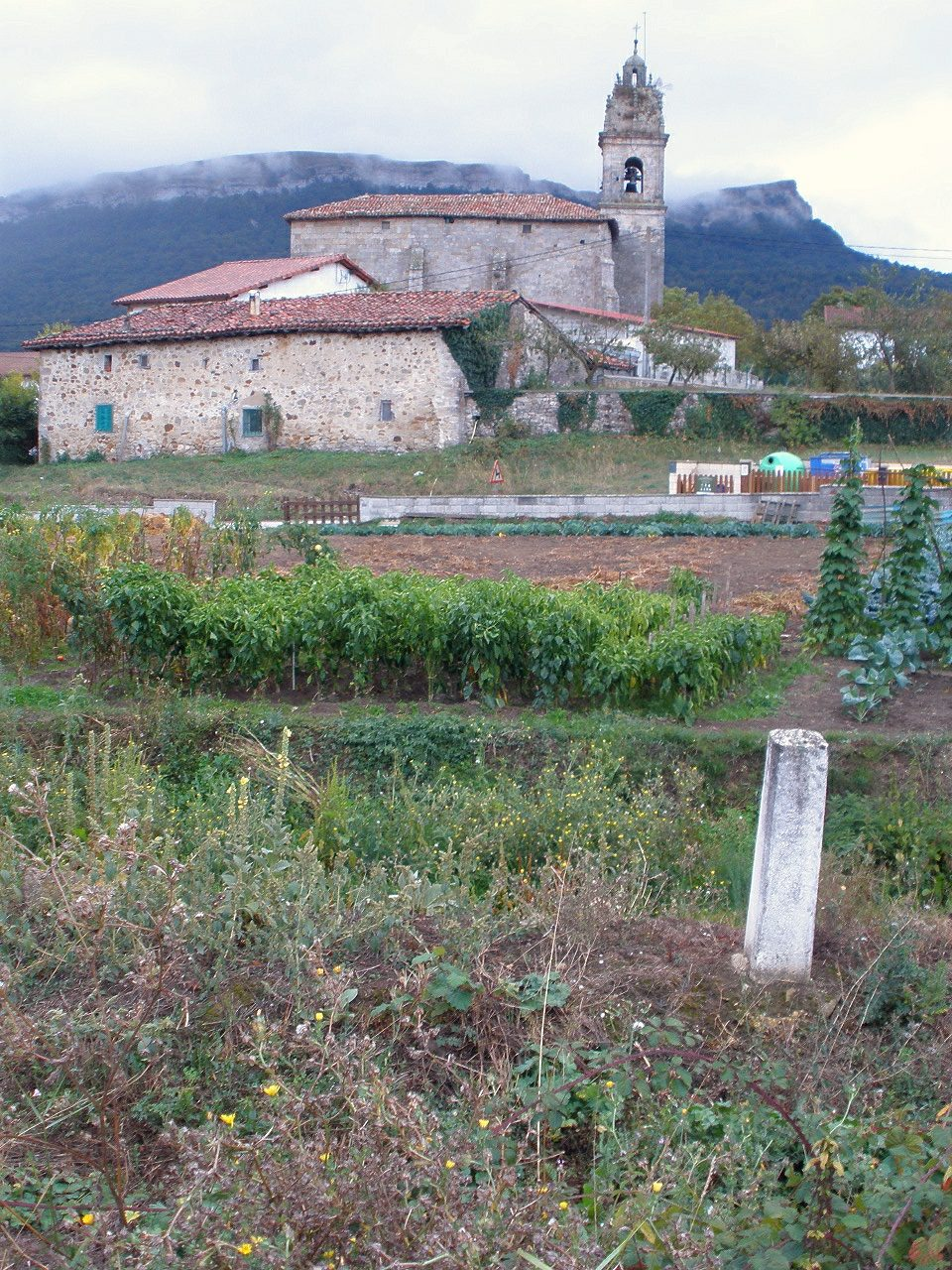
- View of the Albéniz church

- Location within Álava Location within the Basque Country Location within Spain
- Country: Spain
- Autonomous community: Basque Country
- Province: Álava
- Municipality: Asparrena
- Elevation: 585 m (1,919 ft)

Population
  - Total: 84

Albéniz is a village in Álava, Basque Country, Spain. It is one of the typical villages of the Alava Plain (Spanish: Llanada Alavesa, Basque: Arabako lautada) nestled in the municipality of Asparrena. The village surrounds a svelte church with its tower and it is enclosed by the Umandia, Albéniz, Olano and Ballo mountains. It has a few districts such as San Juan and San Bartolomé as well as scatterings of population in Moñete, Orrao and La Estación.

== History ==
In its sometimes not well documented history, there are indications that the Roman road from Bordeaux to Astorga once crossed through this town. This old route is currently the base of the Madrid-Irun railway and highway N-I.

It has been suggested that the current people of Albéniz correspond to the population of Albani, as suggested by Plinio, because of the similarity between its name and the important Roman mansion of Alba. Additionally the innumerable archaeological remains found within the territory or the indication by Lorenzo de Prestamero of how he saw, at the end of the 13th century a tombstone, now defunct, in the altar of the hermitage of Andra Mari of Orrao, add credence to this position. To reinforce this idea, in the Araia Church there are four stones as well as many other fragments of Roman inscriptions, however, because of their poor state of preservation, it is not possible to understand their meaning.

Another detail that can reaffirm the relationship between Albéniz and the former Alba may be that the distance that the Roman Antonine Itinerary mentions between the Tulonio, now Alegeria, Dulantzi and Alba mansions was 3 leagues or 12 miles, which is the actual distance between the two populations mentioned.

As a further means of identification of the two names, a 1932 article in the Revista Internacional de los Estudios Vascos (International Journal of Basque Studies) mentioned in the chapter "El territorio de los vascos" (The Basques territories): "the towns of Tuboricum (Motrico), Tullonium (Alegeria), Alba (Albéniz) close to Salvatierra ..."

Upholding the theory that the inhabitants of Alba were the Albanians themselves and subsequent texts in which they are listed as Alabanians, one can say that this is the origin of the word Álava, name of the province in which Albéniz is located. In an Arabic text from 758 AD, the inhabitants of the zone were referred to as "varduli alabanensis" (varduli alabanians).

In the Middle Ages Albéniz appeared in a document of the Voto de San Millán having to pay a ram along with three other adjoining villages and even in 1062 and 1071 it was listed as a toponymic surname in various documents. In the 13th century it was included within the Archpriesthood of Eguílaz, together with the districts of Amamio, a village between Albéniz and Araia. For quite some time it was under the protection of the Count of Oñate.

Because it was on the road to France, in the War of the Convention, 1795, and the removal after the defeat at the Battle of Vitoria, Albéniz was looted by the French: "The French came into this area on July 14 at ten in the morning and, although they entered the church and opened the Blessed Sacrament, they did no other damage, because the other things were hidden in the hold of the sacristy."

== People ==
It is known that in 1556 there were 30 residents living with five clergymen serving the parish of San Juan and the two hermitages, Orrao and San Bartolomé. In 1786 it had 119 inhabitants, rising in 1888 to 178 and in 1900 to 195. This population increase was mainly due to the rise of the mills. Subsequently, its population has been declining, and in 1950 it had 164, 134 in 1970, and currently, 84. From the history of the people it has been said, curiously, that around 1845 the village of Albéniz-Albeiz was referred to as cold and healthy, but its people were suffering from chest and side diseases.

The culture of Albéniz-Albeiz can be endorsed in the fact that as early as the 19th century there was a school equipped with 500 reals attended by fifteen children of both sexes and that the parish of San Juan Bautista was served by two perpetual beneficiaries, presented by the town council, and one of them took charge of the care of souls.

== Famous people ==
The professional rider, Alberto López de Munain, was born in Albéniz. From 1996 he was associated with the Fundación Euskadi team. His greatest deeds are victories in Stage 0 of the Dauphiné Libéré, France, on 4 June 2000; Stage 1 Tour of Asturias, Spain, on 9 May 2000; Stage 5 Tour of Asturias, Spain, 15 May 2001, Stage 2 Alcobendas Classics, Spain on 12 May 2001, and third overall in the Naranco Ascent, Spain on 18 May 2003.

Luis Maria Diaz de Otazu, also from Albéniz is also connected with professional racing with the ONCE team.

== Places of interest ==
- San Juan Bautista Parish Church.
- San Juan de Amamio Hermitage (XVI).
- Two river mills.
- The Lece Cave - This is a spectacular cave formed by the Artzanegi river. It is useful for canyoning.

In Araia

- Just 3 miles from the town, is the Ajuria Urigoitia foundery, constructed in stone in the early 19th century.

== Celebrations ==
The feast of St. John is celebrated on 24 June annually.
