= Ramiro González (politician) =

Spanish politician

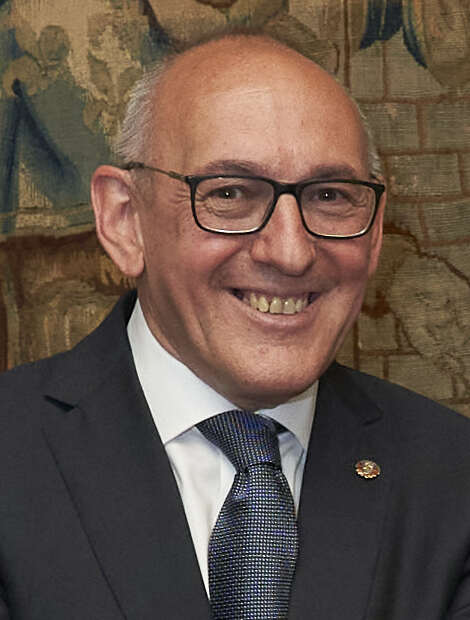
- González in 2023

Deputy General of Álava
- Incumbent
- Assumed office 30 June 2015
- Preceded by: Javier de Andrés

Member of the General Assembly of Álava
- Incumbent
- Assumed office 20 June 2007
- Constituency: Vitoria-Gasteiz

Personal details
- Born: Ramiro González Vicente; 20 April 1962 (age 64) Burgos, Spain
- Party: EAJ/PNV
- Education: University of the Basque Country

Ramiro González Vicente (Spanish: [raˈmiɾo ɣonˈθaleθ βiˈθente]; born 20 April 1962) is a Spanish politician. A member of the Basque Nationalist Party, he has served as Deputy General of Álava since 2015.

== Biography ==
He was born in Burgos, but moved to Vitoria-Gasteiz at the age of four. He studied law at the University of the Basque Country, and subsequently worked as a lawyer for 25 years. He is married and has two children. He has lived in Mendoza since around 2000.

He became a member of the Basque Nationalist Party in 2002, and in 2007 he was elected to the Juntas Generales of Álava. During his first term, he served as deputy spokesman for the party under Deputy General Xabier Agirre. When Agirre left in 2011 after the election of Javier de Andrés, he became spokesman of the party in the Juntas Generales.

In the 2015 election, his party became the largest in the chamber and subsequently formed a minority coalition government with the Socialist Party of the Basque Country. Both coalition partners improved their results in the 2019 election, resulting in his reelection, this time heading a majority coalition government. He was reelected to a third term in 2023, returning to a minority coalition government. He is the first Deputy General that has served for three terms.
