= Foral Union of the Basque Country =

Foral Union of the Basque Country Unión Foral del País Vasco
- Founded: 1979
- Ideology: Conservatism
- Political position: Right-wing

Foral Union of the Basque Country (Spanish: Unión Foral del País Vasco, UFPV) was a Spanish party alliance formed to contest the 1979 general election in the Basque Country by the Democratic Coalition and the Basque Independent Democrats. It maintained contacts to reach an alliance with the Union of the Democratic Centre (UCD), but these proved fruitless.

== Member parties ==
- Democratic Coalition (CD)
- Basque Independent Democrats (DIV)
