= General Assemblies (Basque Country) =

Legislature of Biscay, Gipuzkoa, Alava, and Navarre

General Assemblies Batzar Nagusiak Juntas Generales

Type
- Type: Spanish regional legislature
- Houses: Unicameral
- Seats: 51

The General Assemblies (Spanish: Juntas Generales; Basque: Batzar Nagusiak) is the name of the legislative body (legislature) of the Spanish Basque territories of Biscay, Gipuzkoa, Alava and Navarre, and the elected assemblies to which the Government of each territory is responsible. The northern, French Basque Country, had its own regional assemblies until the Napoleonic period.

== The 4 legislative bodies ==
The four legislative bodies of the Assembly are as follows:

- General Assemblies of Biscay (in Biscay): composed of fifty-one members. The head of the legislature is the speaker of the General Assemblies of Biscay. The assembly elects the head of the government (called "General Deputy of Biscay") and he or she appoints their ministers. The regional government (called "Provincial Council of Biscay") is responsible to the General Assemblies.
- General Assemblies of Gipuzkoa (in Gipuzkoa): composed of fifty-one members. The head of the legislature is the speaker of the General Assemblies of Gipuzkoa. The assembly elects the head of the government (called "General Deputy of Gipuzkoa") and he or she appoints their ministers. The regional government (called "Provincial Council of Gipuzkoa") is responsible to the General Assemblies.
- General Assemblies of Álava (in Álava): composed of fifty-one members. The head of the legislature is the speaker of the General Assemblies of Álava. The assembly elects the head of the government (called "General Deputy of Álava") and he or she appoints their ministers. The regional government (called "Provincial Council of Álava") is responsible to the General Assemblies.
- Parliament of Navarre (in Navarre): composed of fifty deputies. The head of the legislature is the speaker of the Parliament of Navarre.

== Historical development ==
Little is known about the historical background of these local and regional institutions prior to the 14th century. Broadly speaking, two historical periods can be distinguished:

1. The period from the 14th century to 1876 when the Juntas Generales were abolished
2. The period from 1979 to the present when the Juntas Generales were reinstated.

=== 14th century to 1876 ===
This legislative bodies go back to the 14th century. They were part of an early form of democratic institutions. At the local level, the heads of households (male or female) would meet on Sundays after church at the church door in a meeting called elizate (or anteiglesia in Spanish) to debate and decide on local issues. An elizate in turn would elect someone to represent the local community at the assembly (juntas), which existed from the district level right up to the General Assemebly (Juntas Generales).

After the First Carlist War, the fueros were much weakened and eventually fully abolished after the Third Carlist War in 1876. Although the Spanish Government of the time established the conciertos económicos involving low taxes, protective tariffs and self-collection of taxes, Madrid demolished Basque institutions including the Juntas Generales.

=== Since 1979 ===
Following the Spanish transition to democracy in the 1970s the Statute of Autonomy of the Basque Country re-instated the Juntas Generales in Biscay, Gipuzkoa and Álava in 1979.

== Parliament of Navarre ==
Unlike the other Basque provinces, Navarre had evolved into the Kingdom of Navarre and had developed to a large extent feudal traditions and institutions in line with other European kingdoms of the time. As a result, it was largely excluded from the development of such early democratic institutions. However, the royal authority was but one layer of the governmental institutions, and the latter—diputacion or government council, "The Three States" (Cortes)—were based on the Navarrese charters stemming from similar values, traditions and institutions to the other Basque regions.

It did have a charter however, the 1841 Ley Paccionada de Fueros which Navarre managed to protect when the fueros of Biscay, Gipuzkoa and Álava were abolished in 1879.

== General Assemblies of Gipuzkoa ==
- General Assemblies of Gipuzkoa

== General Assemblies of Biscay ==
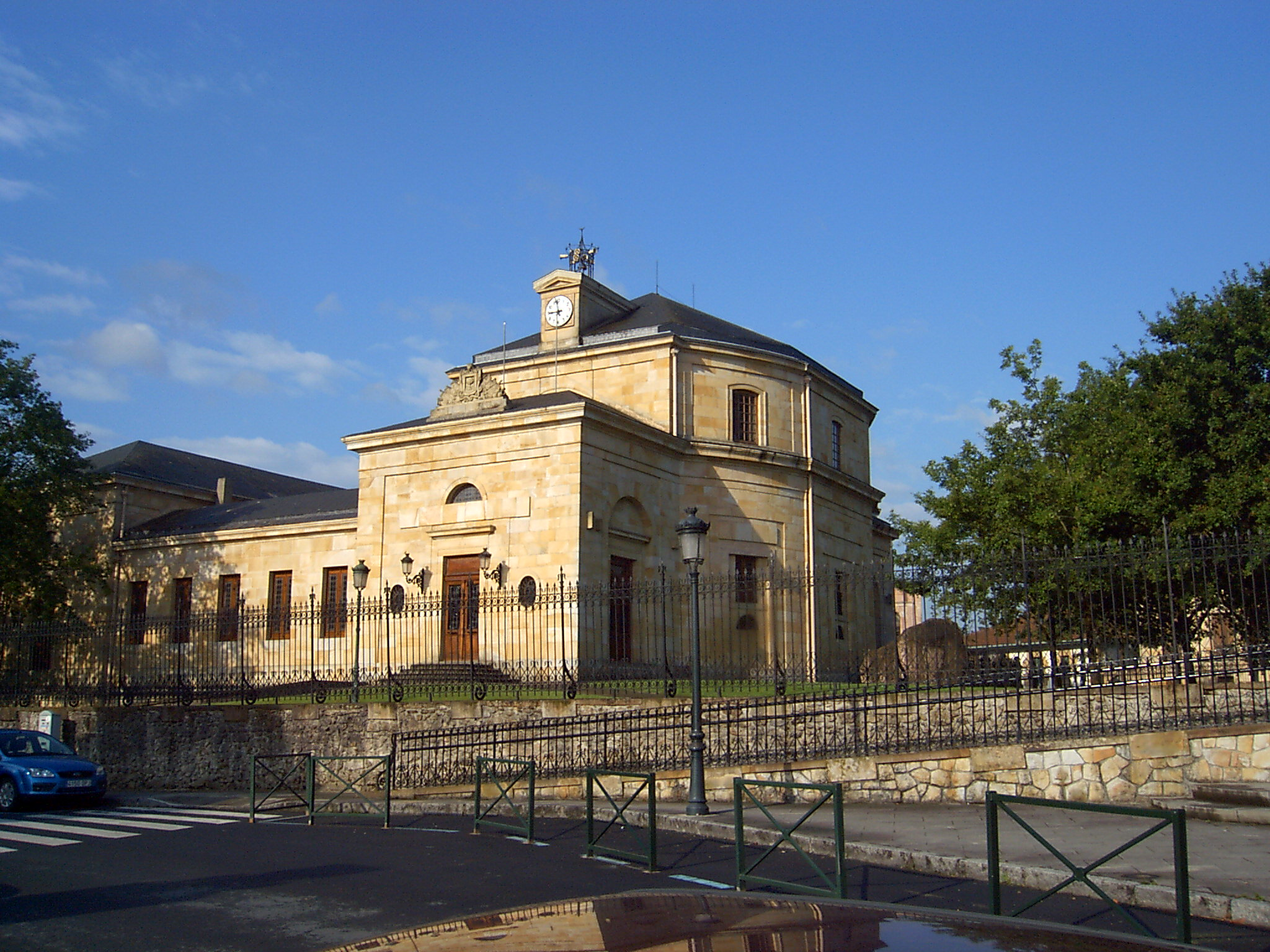
The Casa de Juntas in Gernika-Lumo.

Both historically and currently, the Juntas Generales of Biscay are based in Gernika-Lumo, at the famous Casa de Juntas. Prior to the abolition of the foral laws and the Juntas Generales of Biscay, the Basque señoríos met under the Oak of Gernika to swear they would respect the ancient laws of Biscay.

Of all historical Juntas Generales, this is perhaps the most widely known and important one as it was in Gernika the Spanish monarchs were required to swear to uphold the Basque freedoms since the incorporation of Biscay and Gipuzkoa into the Kingdom of Castile from 1200 onwards.

=== The modern era ===
The modern Juntas Generales of Biscay were re-instated in 1979 and form a unicameral assembly. Its 51 (90 in 1979 only) members, the batzarkideak (in Basque) or apoderados (in Spanish), are elected by the people of Biscay every four years alongside the municipal elections.

Their duties are to:

- form the Provincial Council of Biscay (the Diputación Foral de Vizcaya (Spanish)/Bizkaiko Foru Aldundia (Basque)
- to elect a president
- to develop the foral laws of Biscay
- to administer the province's budget

The party political composition since 1979 has been as follows:

	1979	1983	1987	1991	1995	1999	2003	2007	2011	2015	2019	2023
EAJ-PNV	40	26	16	21	20	17	22	23	22	23	25	23
EH Bildu / Bildu									12	11	10	15
PSE-EE	14	13	12	12	10	10	11	14	9	7	8	8
PP / AP	—	4	1	4	9	10	10	8	8	4	2	3
Elkarrekin Bizkaia / Podemos										6	6	2
EB-B / EPK	3	—	—	—	4	1	3	3	—
Aralar							—	1	—
EA			7	4	1	4	5	1
ANV / EH / HB	19	6	10	8	5	9	—	1
ICV-EHE					2	—
EE	4	2	4	2
CDS / UCD	10	—	1
Total	90	51	51	51	51	51	51	51	51	51	51	51

^{1}Since the 1995 elections the EE has been part of the PSE (PSOE).

The president of the Juntas Generales of Biscay has hailed from the Basque Nationalist Party (PNV) since 1987:

Legislature	Lehendakaria	Party
I. (1979–1983)	?	
II. (1983–1987)	?	
III. (1987–1991)	Antxon Aurre Elorrieta	EAJ-PNV
IV. (1991–1995)	Antxon Aurre Elorrieta	EAJ-PNV
V. (1995–1999)	Aitor Esteban Bravo	EAJ-PNV
VI. (1999–2003)	Aitor Esteban Bravo	EAJ-PNV
VII. (2003–2007)	Ana Madariaga Ugarte	EAJ-PNV
VIII. (2007–2011)	Ana Madariaga Ugarte	EAJ-PNV

== General Assemblies of Álava ==
- General Assemblies of Álava

== French Basque Country ==
While they were overall less widely known due to the northern districts—Labourd, Lower Navarre, Soule—falling behind in terms of economic development, they also had assemblies that were largely independent of those of the French state and held charters - the fors, the northern equivalent of the fueros. Their powers and sovereignty were gradually curtailed by the French Crown, notably in 1620 and 1659-1660 following the Treaty of the Pyrenees, but remained in place and relevant (e.g. the Biltzar of Labourd) about decisions affecting regional life until the Napoleonic period (1790).

== See also ==
- Basque señoríos
- Basque and Pyrenean fueros
- Custom (law)
- Elizate
- History of the Basque people
