= Álava =

Province of Spain

Araba/Álava Araba (Basque) Álava (Spanish)
- Province
- Arabako Lurralde Historikoa (Basque)^{1} Territorio Histórico de Álava (Spanish)
- Flag Coat of arms
- Motto: En aumento de la justicia contra malhechores
- Location of the Province of Álava in Spain
- Coordinates: 42°50.67′N 2°45.62′W
- Country: Spain
- Autonomous Community: Basque Country
- Capital: Vitoria-Gasteiz
- Municipalities: 51

Government
  - Deputy General: Ramiro González (EAJ/PNV)
  - Legislature: Juntas Generales

Area
  - Total: 3,037.57 km^{2} (1,172.81 sq mi)
  - Rank: 48th in Spain

Population (2025)
  - Total: 341,961
  - Rank: 37th in Spain
  - Density: 112.577/km^{2} (291.574/sq mi)
- Demonyms: alavés/a (Spanish); arabar (Basque)
- Postal code: 01
- Official languages: Basque; Spanish
- Congress seats: 4 (of 350)
- Senate seats: 4 (of 265)
- Website: Diputación Foral de Álava
- 1. in English: Historical Territory of Álava

The Province of Álava (Spanish: [ˈalaβ̞a]) or Araba (Basque pronunciation: [aˈɾaβ̞a]), officially Araba/Álava, is a province of Spain and a historical territory of the Basque Country, heir of the ancient Lordship of Álava, former medieval Catholic bishopric and now Latin titular see.

Its capital city, Vitoria-Gasteiz, is also the seat of the political main institutions of the Basque Autonomous Community. It borders the Basque provinces of Biscay and Gipuzkoa to the north, the community of La Rioja to the south, the province of Burgos (in the community of Castile and León) to the west and the community of Navarre to the east. The Enclave of Treviño, surrounded by Alavese territory, is however part of the province of Burgos, thus belonging to the autonomous community of Castile and León, not Álava.

It is the largest of the 3 provinces in the Basque Country with an area of 3,037.57 square kilometres (1,172.81 sq mi), but also the least populated with a population of only 341,961.

== Etymology ==
Built around the Roman mansion Alba located on the road ab Asturica Burdigalam (possibly the current village of Albéniz near Salvatierra), it has sometimes been argued the name may stem from that landmark. However, according to the Royal Academy of the Basque Language, the origin may be another: The name is first found on Muslim chronicles of the eighth century referring to the Alavese Plains (Spanish Llanada Alavesa, Basque Arabako Lautada), laua in old Basque (currently lautada) with the Arab article added (al + laua), developing into Spanish Álava and Basque Araba (a typical development of l to r between vowels).

== History ==
=== Lordship of Álava ===
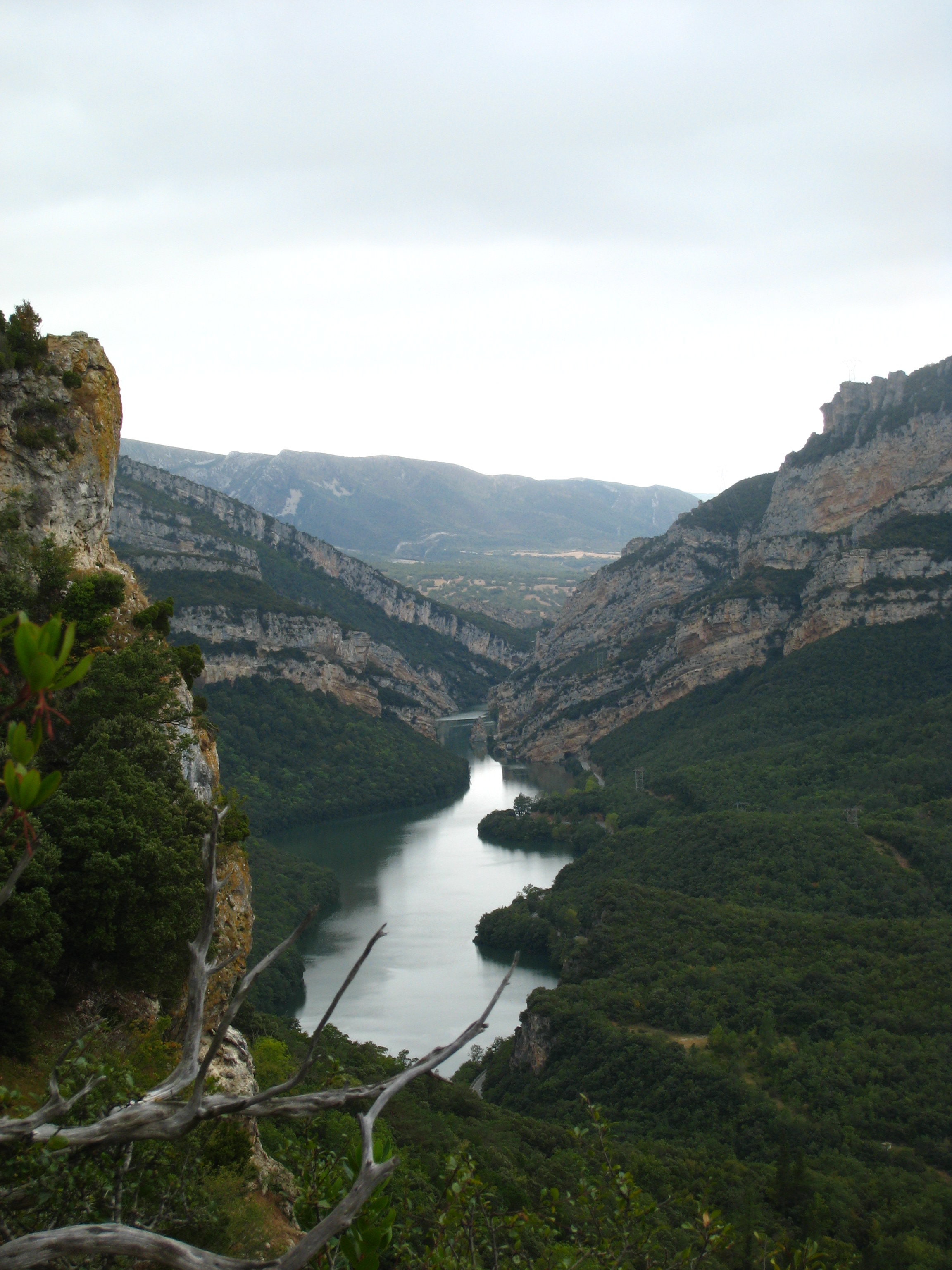
Sobrón, next to the Ebro river

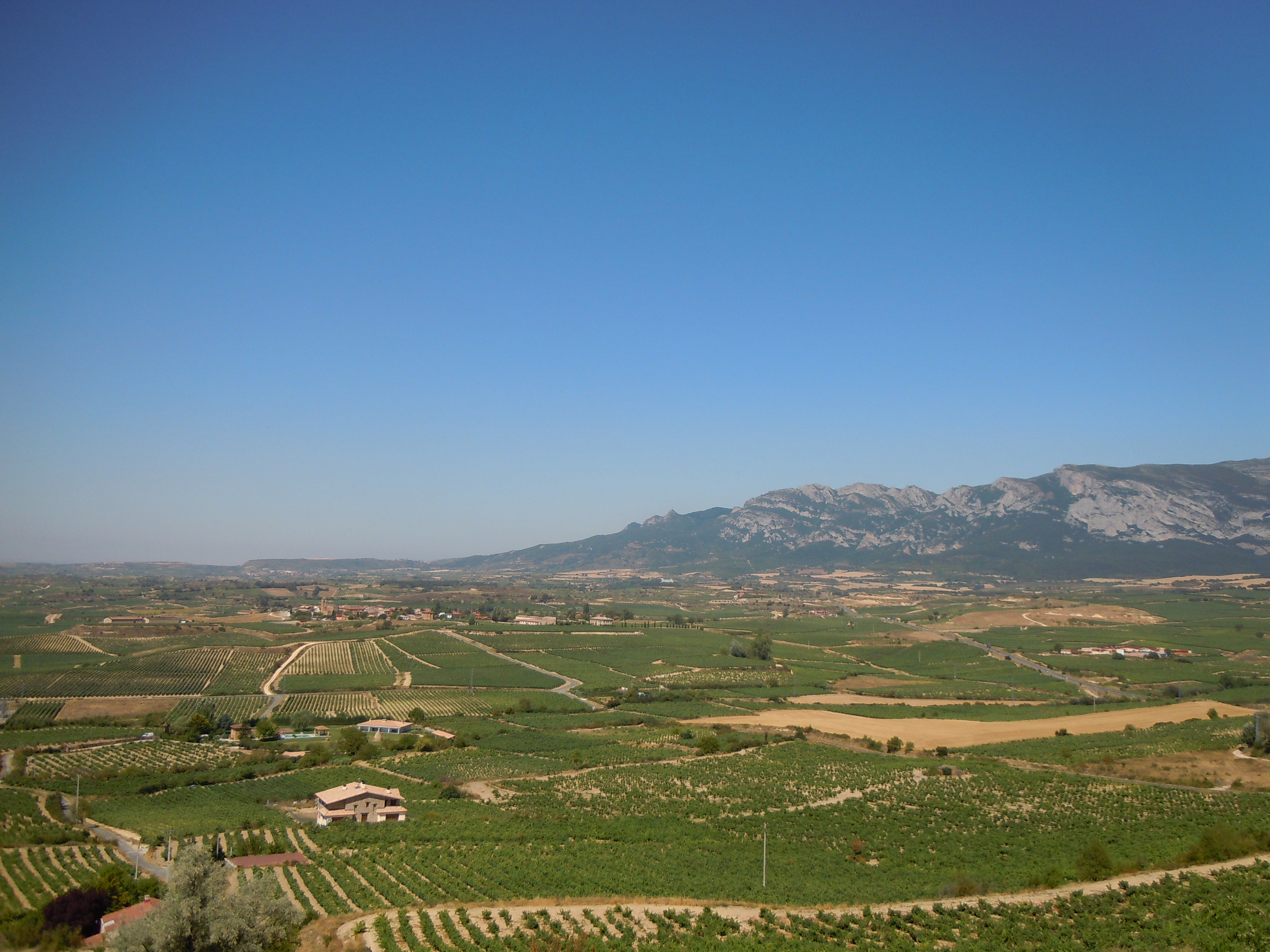
The Rioja Alavesa

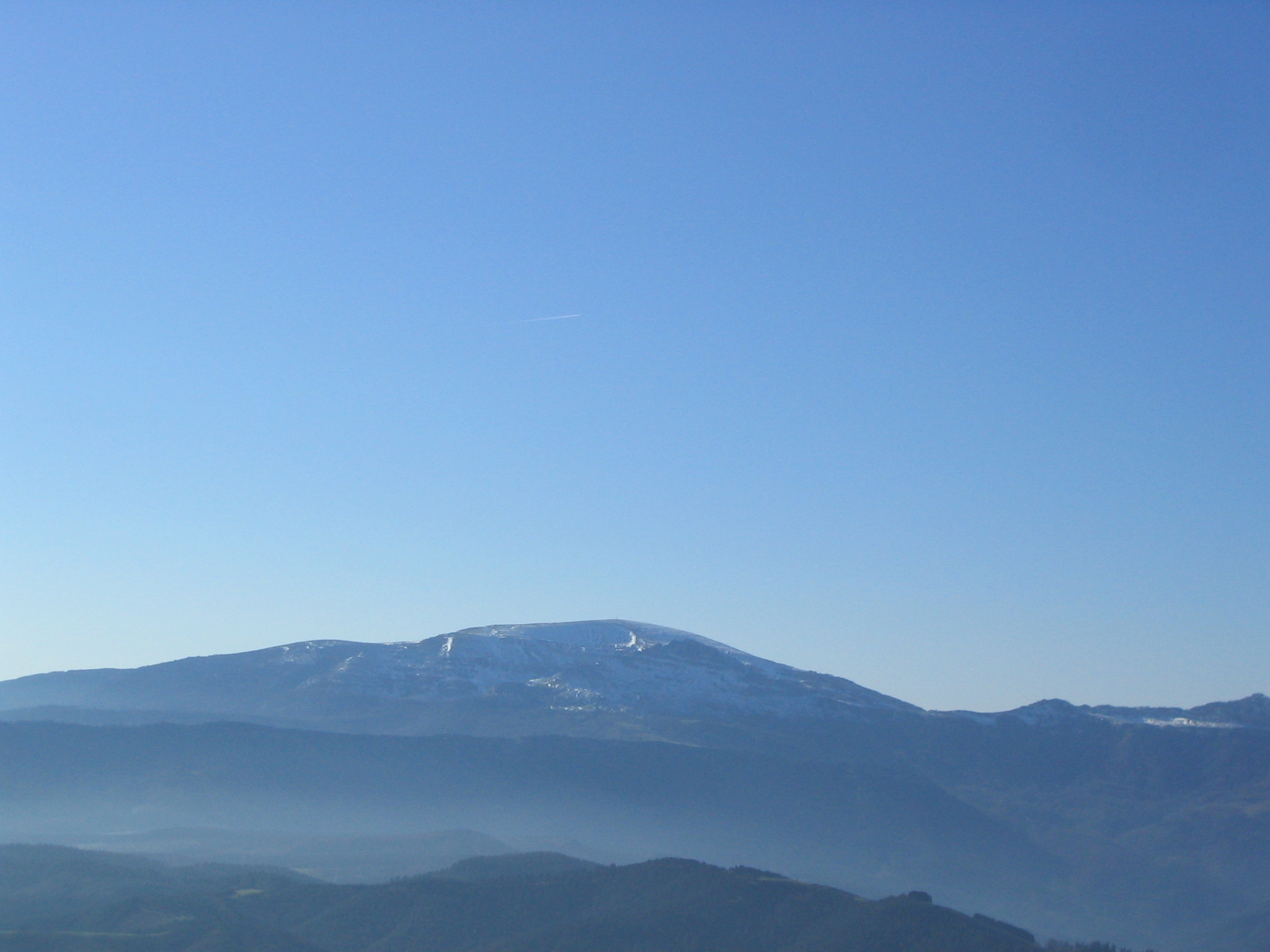
Gorbea, Álava's highest mountain

List of rulers (modern Spanish names) :

- Eylo, up to 866
- Rodrigo c. 867–870, count of Castile
- Vela Jiménez 870–c. 887
- Munio Velaz c. 887–c. 921
- Álvaro Herraméliz c. 921–931, also count of Cerezo and Lantarón
- Fernán González 931–970, also count of Castile, Álava feudatory of Castile until 1030
- García Fernández 970–995
- Munio González 1030–1043
- Fortunio Íñiguez 1043–1046
- Munio Muñoz (co-lord) 1046–1060, Álava feudatory of Navarre, 1046–1085
- Sancho Maceratiz (co-lord) 1046–1060
- Ramiro 1060–1075
- Marcelo 1075–1085
- Lope Íñiguez 1085–?, Álava feudatory of Castile until 1123
- Lope Díaz the White ?–1093
- Lope González 1093–1099
- Lope Sánchez 1099–1114
- Diego López I 1114–1123
- Ladrón Íñiguez 1123–1158, Álava feudatory of Navarre until 1199
- Vela Ladrón 1158–1175
- Juan Velaz 1175–1181
- Diego López II 1181–1187
- Íñigo de Oriz 1187–1199
- Diego López de Haro I 1199–1214, Álava feudatory of Castile until personal union of 1332
- Lope Diaz de Haro I 1214–1240
- Nuño González de Lara 1240–1252
- Diego López de Haro II 1252–1274
- Fernando de la Cerda 1274–1280
- Lope Díaz II de Haro 1280–1288
- Juan Alonso de Haro 1288–1310
- Diego López de Salcedo 1310–1332

The title is attributed to the Castilian kings after 1332.

=== Ecclesiastical history ===
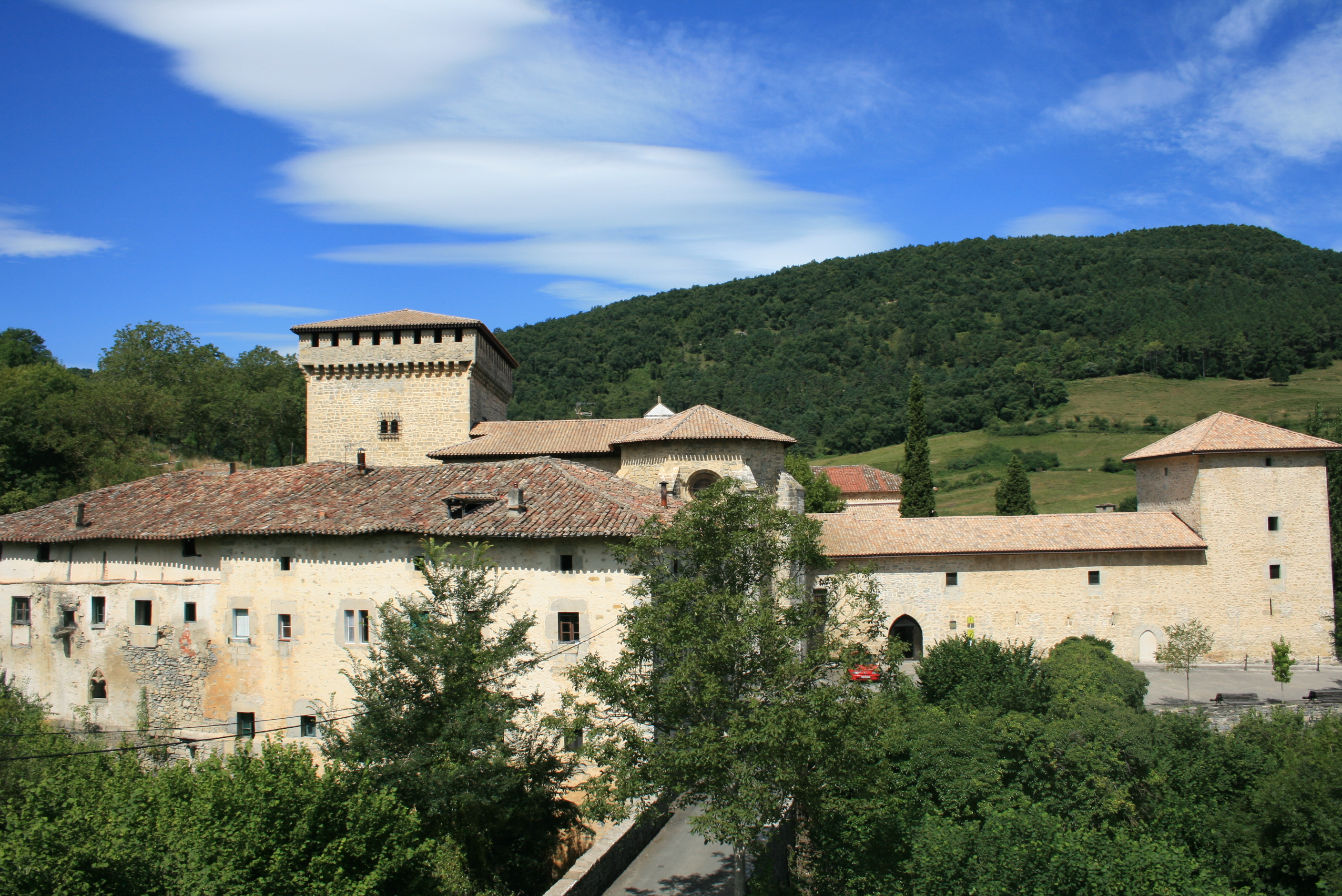
Quejana monastery in Ayala

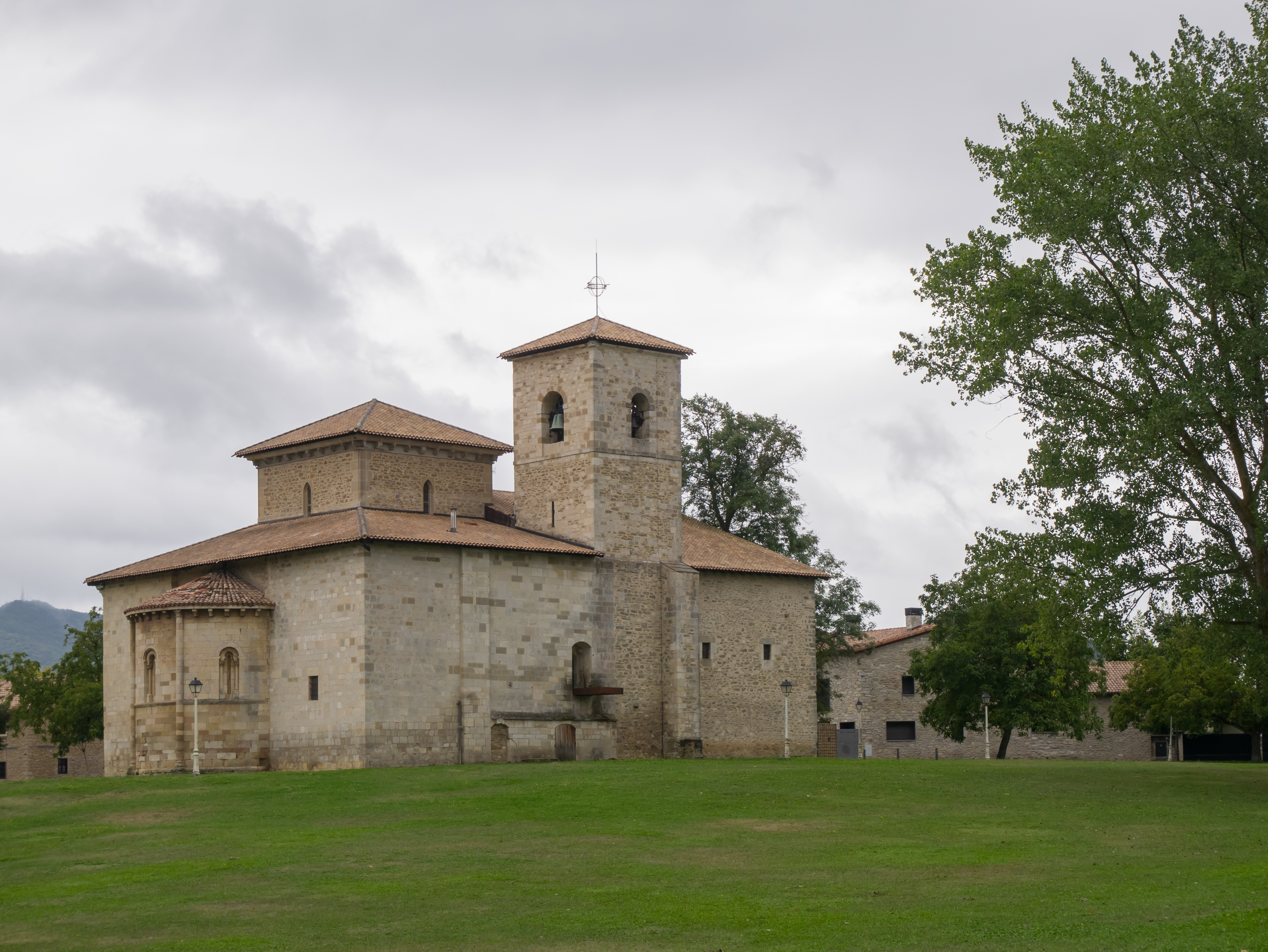
Basilica of San Prudencio, located in Armentia, Vitoria-Gasteiz

==== Bishopric ====
The diocese called Álava or Armentaria was established in 870 on territory split off from the Diocese of Calahorra. From then until the 11th century the names of several bishops of this see are recorded, the best known being the last, Fortún, who in 1072 went to Rome to argue before Pope Alexander II in defence of the Mozarabic Rite, which King Alfonso VI of León and Castile had decreed should be replaced by the Roman Rite.

The see was suppressed in 1088, when it was merged into the Diocese of Najéra, another suffragan of the Metropolitan Archdiocese of Tarragona. The territory of the diocese of Álava, which corresponded more or less to that of the present Diocese of Vitoria, was reabsorbed into that of Calahorra when Najéra was suppressed in 1170, when King Alfonso VIII of Castile conquered La Rioja.

Suffragan Bishops of Álava

(For a list, see Antonio Rivera, ed., Historia de Álava (2003), pp. 599–600.)

- Bivere or Aivere (before 871 – after 876)
- Álvaro (c. 881 – c. 888)
- Munio I (937/956 – 971)
- ? Julián (?–984)
- Munio II (984–989)
- García I (996 – c. 1021)
- Munio III (c. 1024 – c. 1030)
- García II (1037 – 1053/1055)
- Fortún [Fortuño] I (1054/1055)
- Vela (1056–1062)
- Munio IV (1062 – c. 1065)
- Fortún II (c. 1067 – 1088)

==== Titular see ====
No longer a residential bishopric, Álava is today listed by the Catholic Church as a titular see since the diocese was nominally restored in 1969 as Titular bishopric of Álava.

It has had the following incumbents, so far of the fitting episcopal (lowest) rank:

- Stanisław Smolenski (1970/01/14 – death 2006/08/08) as Auxiliary Bishop of Kraków (Poland) (1970.01.14 – 1992.02.01) and on emeritate
- Mario Iceta Gavicagogeascoa (2008.02.05 – 2010.08.24) as Auxiliary Bishop of Bilbao (Basque Spain) (2008.02.05 – 2010.08.24); later succeeded Bishop of Bilbao (2010.08.24 – ...)
- Nelson Francelino Ferreira (2010.11.24 – 2014.02.12) as Auxiliary Bishop of São Sebastião do Rio de Janeiro (Brazil) (2010.11.24 – 2014.02.12); later Bishop of Valença (Brazil) (2014.02.12 – ...)
- Carlos Lema Garcia (2014.04.30 – ...), as Auxiliary Bishop of São Paulo (Brazil)

=== Spanish Civil War ===
At the start of the Spanish Civil War Álava and Vitoria were easily captured by the rebel Nationalists led by General Angel García Benítez, assisted by Colonel Camilo Alonso Vega. Vitoria was captured on 19 July 1936. In November 1936 an attempt by Republicans to retake Vitoria was thwarted after being spotted by Nationalist reconnaissance aircraft. The 1937 Nationalist campaign in Vizcaya was supported by 80 German aircraft based at Vitoria, where the Condor Legion fighter wing was concentrated.

== Geography ==
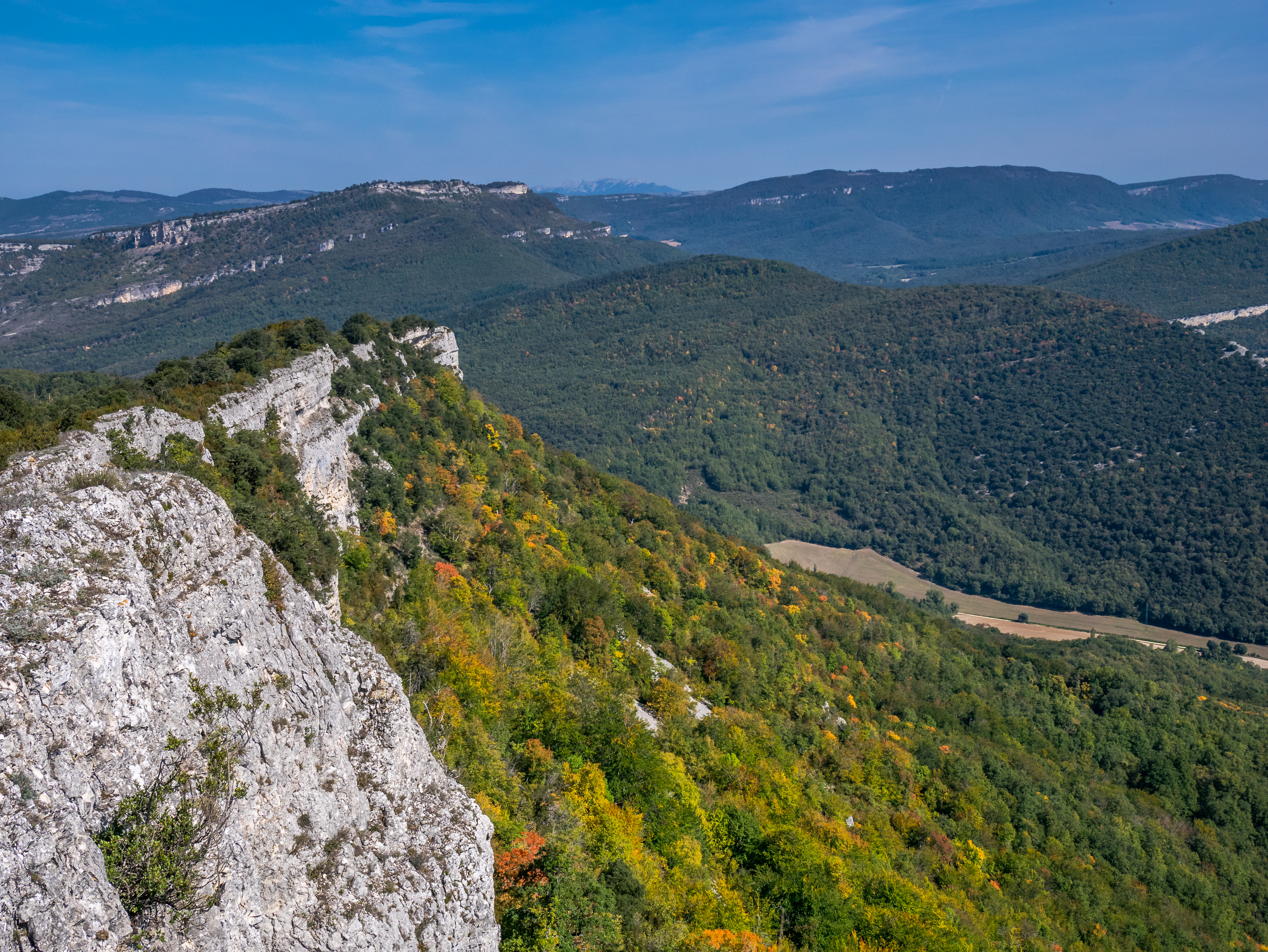
Izki natural park

Álava is an inland territory and features a largely transitional climate between the humid, Atlantic neighbouring northern provinces and the dry and warmer lands south of the Ebro River. According to the relief and landscape characteristics, the territory is divided into five main zones:

- The Gorbea Foothills: Green hilly landscape.
- The Valleys: Low valleys, drier, sparsely populated.
- The Plains: Heartland of Álava comprising Vitoria and Salvatierra-Agurain, with a central urban area and crop landscape prevailing around and bounded south and north by the Basque Mountains.
- The Alavese Mountains: High altitude and forested.
- The Alavese Rioja: Oriented to the south on the left bank of the Ebro River, perfect for vineyards and part of the Rioja denominación de origen.
- Ayala: The area clustering around the Nervión River, with Amurrio and Laudio as its major towns. The region shows close bonds with Bilbao and Biscaye and an industrial landscape.

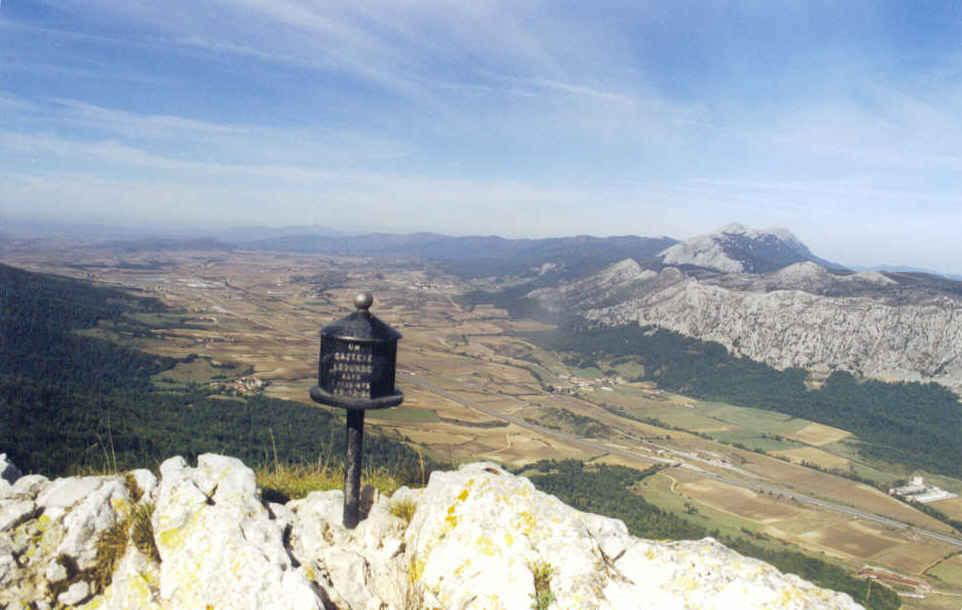
Tip of the Burunda corridor in Navarre, opening on the Alavese Plains, with the Basque Mountains Aratz and Aizkorri on the right

Unlike Biscay and Gipuzkoa, but for Ayala and Aramaio, the waters of Álava pour into the Ebro and hence to the Mediterranean by means of two main waterways, i.e. the Zadorra (main axis of Álava) and Bayas Rivers. In addition, the Zadorra Reservoir System harvests a big quantity of waters that supply not only the capital city but other major Basque towns and cities too, like Bilbao.

While in 1950 agriculture and farming shaped the landscape of the territory (42.4% of the working force vs 30.5% in industry and construction), the trend shifted gradually during the 60s and 70s on the grounds of a growing industrial activity in the Alavese Plains (Llanada Alavesa), with the main focus lying on the industrial estates of Vitoria-Gasteiz (Gamarra, Betoño and Ali Gobeo) and, to a lesser extent, Salvatierra-Agurain and Araia. At the turn of the century, only 2% of the working Alavese people was in agriculture, while 60% was in the tertiary sector and 32% in manufacturing. Industry associated with iron and metal developed earlier in the Atlantic area much in tune with Bilbao's economic dynamics, with droves of people flocking to and clustering in Amurrio and Laudio, which have since become the third and second main towns of Álava.

== Demographics ==
Historical population
Year	Pop.	±%
1842	70,134	—
1857	96,398	+37.4%
1877	95,692	−0.7%
1887	94,165	−1.6%
1900	98,066	+4.1%
1910	99,399	+1.4%
1920	101,357	+2.0%
1930	105,729	+4.3%
1940	112,503	+6.4%
1950	114,139	+1.5%
1960	133,742	+17.2%
1970	199,777	+49.4%
1981	257,850	+29.1%
1991	272,447	+5.7%
2001	286,387	+5.1%
2011	320,778	+12.0%
2021	333,485	+4.0%
Source: INE

As of 2026, the population is 341,961, of which 49.2% are male, and 50.8% are female. Minors make up 16.4% of the population, and seniors make up 22.9%.

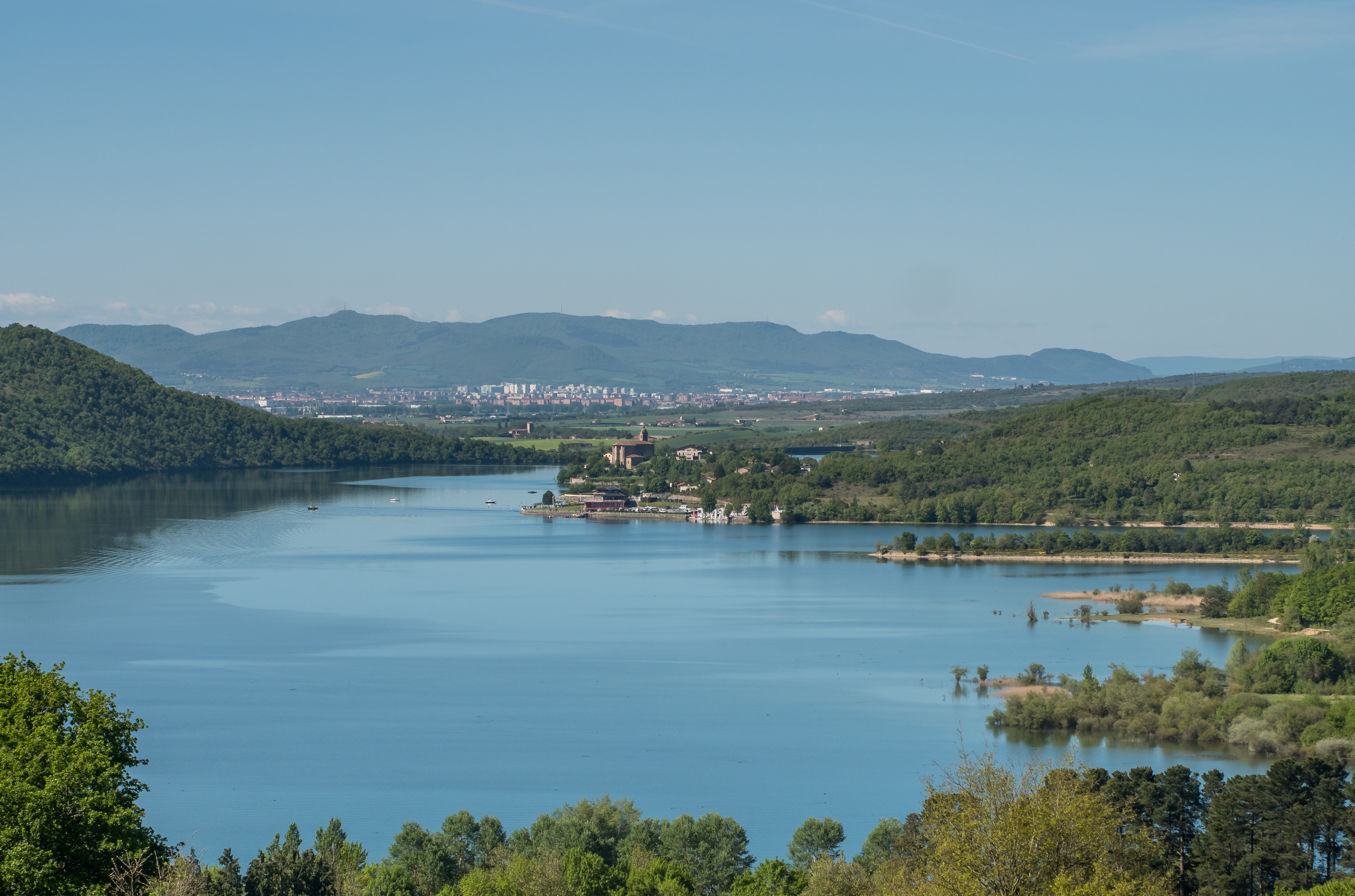
Ullibarri-Gamboa

The province numbers 51 municipalities, a population of 315,525 inhabitants in an area of 3,037 km^{2} (1,173 sq mi), with an average of 104.50 inhabitants/km^{2}. The vast majority of the population clusters in the capital city of Álava, Vitoria-Gasteiz, which also serves as the capital of the Autonomous Community, but the remainder of the territory is sparsely inhabited with population nuclei distributed into seven counties (kuadrillak or cuadrillas): Añana; Ayala/Aiara; Campezo/Kanpezu; Laguardia; Agurain/Salvatierra; Vitoria-Gasteiz; Zuia.

A 2021 sociolinguistic survey found that 22.4% of the adult population spoke Basque, an increase of six percentage points since 2011.

Most populated municipalities (2025)
#	Municipality	Population	#	Municipality	Population
1	Vitoria-Gasteiz	260,402	11	Artziniega	1,868
2	Llodio	18,063	12	Zigoitia	1,841
3	Amurrio	10,346	13	Asparrena	1,611
4	Agurain	5,173	14	Labastida	1,573
5	Iruña Oka	3,697	15	Erriberabeitia	1,493
6	Oion	3,541	16	Laguardia	1,468
7	Dulantzi	2,961	17	Urkabustaiz	1,460
8	Aiara	2,917	18	Aramaio	1,353
9	Zuia	2,365	19	Okondo	1,180
10	Legutio	2,094	20	Kanpezu	1,071

=== Immigration ===
As of 2025, immigrants make up 16.6% of the population. The 5 largest foreign countries of birth are Colombia, Morocco, Algeria, Peru, and Venezuela.

== Government ==
=== Juntas Generales ===
The Juntas Generales of Álava are the unicameral assembly of the province. The deputy general of Álava (Basque: Arabako ahaldun nagusia, Spanish: Diputado General de Álava) is the head of the Foral Deputation.

== See also ==
- List of municipalities in Álava
- Sonsierra
