= 2005 Basque regional election =

Election in the Spanish region of the Basque Country

- 17 April 2005

All 75 seats in the Basque Parliament 38 seats needed for a majority
- Opinion polls
- Registered: 1,799,523 ▼0.8%
- Turnout: 1,223,634 (68.0%) ▼11.0 pp
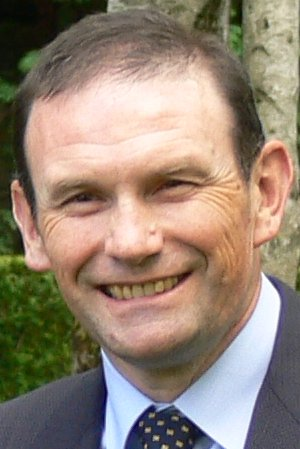

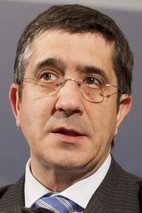

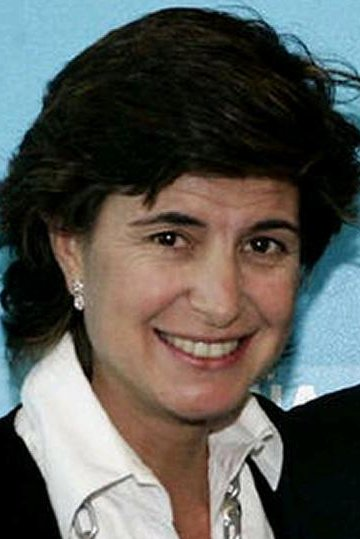

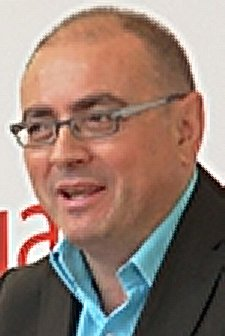

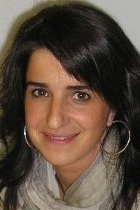
	First party	Second party	Third party
Leader	Juan José Ibarretxe	Patxi López	María San Gil
Party	PNV–EA	PSE–EE (PSOE)	PP
Leader since	31 January 1998	23 March 2002	6 November 2004
Leader's seat	Álava	Biscay	Guipúzcoa
Last election	33 seats, 42.4%	13 seats, 17.8%	19 seats, 22.9%
Seats won	29	18	15
Seat change	▼4	▲5	▼4
Popular vote	468,117	274,546	210,614
Percentage	38.4%	22.5%	17.3%
Swing	▼4.0 pp	▲4.7 pp	▼5.6 pp
	Fourth party	Fifth party	Sixth party
Leader	Maite Aranburu	Javier Madrazo	Aintzane Ezenarro
Party	PCTV/EHAK	EB–B	Aralar
Leader since	2005	14 May 1994	14 November 2004
Leader's seat	Biscay	Biscay	Guipúzcoa
Last election	7 seats, 10.0% (Note: Results for EH in the 2001 election.)	3 seats, 5.5% (Note: Results for IU/EB in the 2001 election.)	Did not contest
Seats won	9	3	1
Seat change	▲2	0	▲1
Popular vote	150,644	65,023	28,180
Percentage	12.4%	5.3%	2.3%
Swing	▲2.4 pp	▼0.2 pp	New party
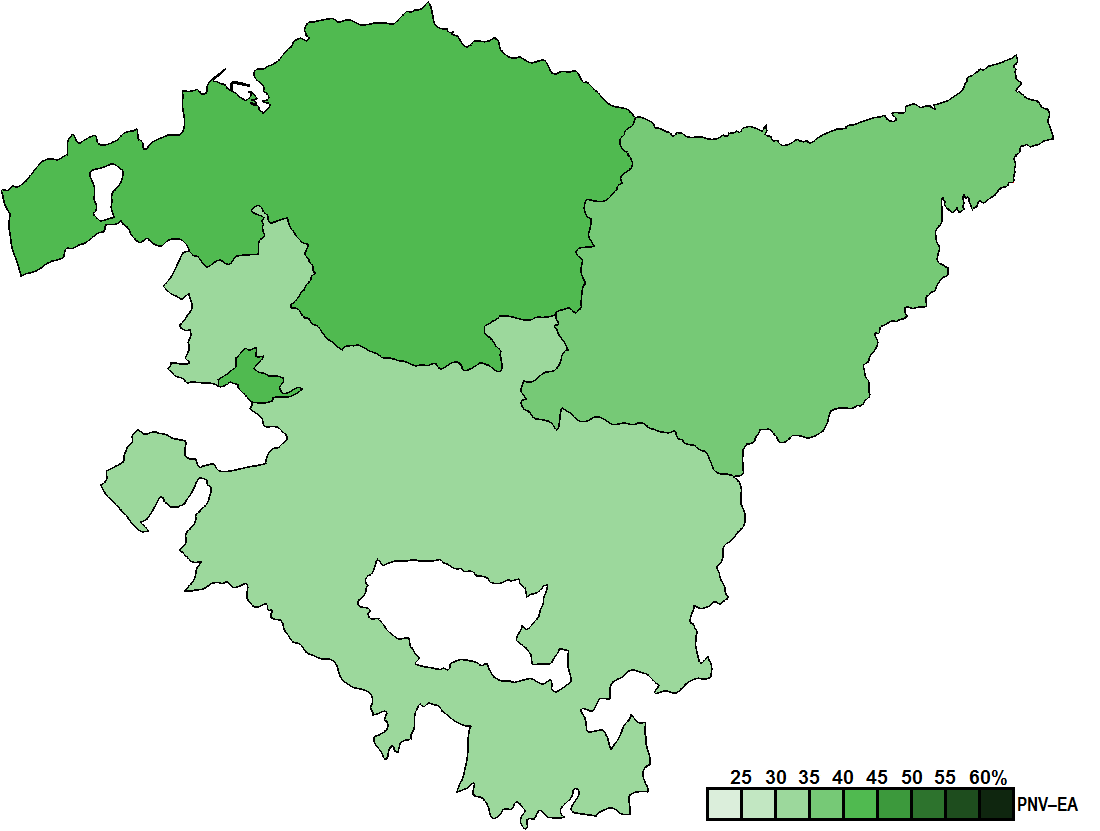
Lehendakari before election
Juan José Ibarretxe
EAJ/PNV
Lehendakari after election
Juan José Ibarretxe
EAJ/PNV

A regional election was held in the Basque Country on 17 April 2005 to elect the 8th Parliament of the autonomous community. All 75 seats in the Parliament were up for election.

The electoral alliance Basque Nationalist Party–Basque Solidarity (PNV–EA) won 29 seats, the Socialist Party of the Basque Country–Basque Country Left (PSE–EE) came second with 18 seats, the People's Party (PP) came in third with 15 seats. The controversial Communist Party of the Basque Homelands (PCTV/EHAK) won 9 seats, having been endorsed by the banned Batasuna party.

== Overview ==
Under the 1979 Statute of Autonomy, the Basque Parliament was the unicameral legislature of the Basque Autonomous Community, having legislative power in devolved matters, as well as the ability to grant or withdraw confidence from a lehendakari. The electoral and procedural rules were supplemented by national law provisions.

=== Date ===
The term of the Basque Parliament expired four years after the date of its previous election, unless it was dissolved earlier. The election decree was required to be issued no later than 25 days before the scheduled expiration date of parliament and published on the following day in the Official Gazette of the Basque Country (BOPV), with election day taking place 54 days after the decree's publication. The previous election was held on 13 May 2001, which meant that the chamber's term would have expired on 13 May 2005. The election decree was required to be published in the BOPV no later than 19 April 2005, setting the latest possible date for election day on 12 June 2005.

The lehendakari had the prerogative to dissolve the Basque Parliament at any given time and call a snap election, provided that no motion of no confidence was in process. In the event of an investiture process failing to elect a lehendakari within a 60-day period from the Parliament's reconvening, the chamber was to be automatically dissolved and a fresh election called.

The Basque Parliament was officially dissolved on 22 February 2005 with the publication of the corresponding decree in the BOPV, setting election day for 17 April.

=== Electoral system ===
Voting for the Parliament was based on universal suffrage, comprising all Spanish nationals over 18 years of age, registered in the Basque Country and with full political rights, provided that they had not been deprived of the right to vote by a final sentence, nor were legally incapacitated.

The Basque Parliament had 75 seats. All were elected in three multi-member constituencies—corresponding to the provinces of Álava, Biscay and Guipúzcoa, each of which was assigned a fixed number of 25 seats to provide for an equal parliamentary representation of the three provinces—using the D'Hondt method and closed-list proportional voting, with a three percent-threshold of valid votes (including blank ballots) in each constituency. The use of this electoral method resulted in a higher effective threshold depending on district magnitude and vote distribution.

The law did not provide for by-elections to fill vacant seats; instead, any vacancies arising after the proclamation of candidates and during the legislative term were filled by the next candidates on the party lists or, when required, by designated substitutes.

=== Outgoing parliament ===
The table below shows the composition of the parliamentary groups in the chamber at the time of dissolution.

Parliamentary composition in February 2005
Groups	Parties	Legislators	
Groups	Parties	Seats	Total
Basque Nationalists Parliamentary Group	EAJ/PNV	26	26
Basque People's Parliamentary Group	PP	19	19
Basque Socialists Parliamentary Group	PSE–EE (PSOE)	13	13
Patriotic Socialist Parliamentary Group	Batasuna	7	7
Basque Solidarity Parliamentary Group	EA	7	7
Mixed Group	EB–B	3	3

== Parties and candidates ==
The electoral law allowed for parties and federations registered in the interior ministry, alliances and groupings of electors to present lists of candidates. Parties and federations intending to form an alliance were required to inform the relevant electoral commission within 10 days of the election call, whereas groupings of electors needed to secure the signature of at least one percent of the electorate in the constituencies for which they sought election, disallowing electors from signing for more than one list.

Below is a list of the main parties and alliances which contested the election:

Candidacy	Parties and alliances	Leading candidate	Ideology	Previous result		Gov.	Ref.
Candidacy	Parties and alliances	Leading candidate	Ideology	Vote %	Seats	Gov.	Ref.
PNV–EA	List: Basque Nationalist Party (EAJ/PNV); Basque Solidarity (EA)	Juan José Ibarretxe	Basque nationalism Christian democracy Conservative liberalism	42.4%	33	Yes	
PP	List: People's Party (PP)	María San Gil	Conservatism; Christian democracy	22.9%	19	No	
PSE–EE (PSOE)	List: Socialist Party of the Basque Country–Basque Country Left (PSE–EE (PSOE))	Patxi López	Social democracy	17.8%	13	No	
PCTV/EHAK	List: Communist Party of the Basque Homelands (PCTV/EHAK)	Maite Aranburu	Basque independence Abertzale left Communism	10.0%	7	No	
EB–B	List: United Left–Greens (EB–B)	Javier Madrazo	Eco-socialism; Democratic socialism	5.5%	3	Yes	
UA	List: Alavese Unity (UA)	Enriqueta Benito	Alavese regionalism Christian democracy	—N/a (Note: UA contested the 1996 election in an electoral alliance with the PP, securing 1 seat.)		No	
Aralar	List: Aralar (Aralar)	Aintzane Ezenarro	Basque independence Left-wing nationalism Democratic socialism	—N/a		No	

== Opinion polls ==
The tables below list opinion polling results in reverse chronological order, showing the most recent first and using the dates when the survey fieldwork was done, as opposed to the date of publication. Where the fieldwork dates are unknown, the date of publication is given instead. The highest percentage figure in each polling survey is displayed with its background shaded in the leading party's colour. If a tie ensues, this is applied to the figures with the highest percentages. The "Lead" column on the right shows the percentage-point difference between the parties with the highest percentages in a poll.

=== Voting intention estimates ===
The table below lists weighted voting intention estimates. Refusals are generally excluded from the party vote percentages, while question wording and the treatment of "don't know" responses and those not intending to vote may vary between polling organisations. When available, seat projections determined by the polling organisations are displayed below (or in place of) the percentages in a smaller font; 38 seats were required for an absolute majority in the Basque Parliament.

Color key:

Exit poll

Polling firm/Commissioner	Fieldwork date	Sample size	Turnout	PNV	PP	PSE–EE (PSOE)	EH	EB–B	EA	UA	Aralar	PCTV/EHAK	Lead
2005 regional election	17 Apr 2005	—N/a	68.0	38.4; 29	17.3; 15	22.5; 18	–	5.3; 3	(Note: Within PNV.)	0.3; 0	2.3; 1	12.4; 9	15.9
TNS Demoscopia/Antena 3 (Note: Quick count.)	17 Apr 2005	?	?	? 28/30	? 14/15	? 18	–	? 3		–	? 1	? 9/10	?
Ipsos–Eco/EITB	17 Apr 2005	65,000	?	? 29/31	? 13/14	? 18	–	? 3		–	? 1	? 9/10	?
Ipsos–Eco/RTVE	17 Apr 2005	?	?	40.3; 30/33	16.2; 13/15	22.5; 18/19	–	6.0; 3/4		–	2.3; 0/1	11.0; 7/8	17.8
TNS Demoscopia/Antena 3	17 Apr 2005	?	?	39.9; 31/33	18.0; 14/16	18.2; 15/17	–	6.1; 3/4		–	3.1; 1	11.3; 7/8	21.7
Opina/Cadena SER	17 Apr 2005	?	?	42.0; 31/33	16.0; 14/15	21.5; 17/18	–	? 4/5		–	? 0/1	7.0; 5/6	20.5
Opina/El País	10 Apr 2005	?	?	42.7; 34/35	15.1; 14/15	21.6; 18/19	–	7.6; 3/4		–	2.3; 1	4.3; 2/4	21.1
Opina/Cadena SER	10 Apr 2005	?	?	42.7; 34	15.1; 13/14	21.6; 18/19	(3.4)	7.6; 4/5		–	2.3; 1	4.3; 2/3	21.1
Opina/Cadena SER	9 Apr 2005	?	?	44.3; 35/36	14.5; 13	23.2; 18/20	(2.9)	6.6; 4		–	2.6; 1	3.7; 2/3	21.1
Opina/Cadena SER	8 Apr 2005	?	?	45.7; 38/39	14.5; 13	23.5; 19/20	(3.3)	6.3; 4		–	1.9; 0	2.7; 0	22.2
Opina/Cadena SER	7 Apr 2005	?	?	43.5; 37/38	15.6; 13	24.5; 20/21	(3.3)	6.4; 4		0.2; 0	1.6; 0	2.5; 0	22.2
Sigma Dos/El Mundo	5–7 Apr 2005	1,000	?	45.6; 35/37	18.3; 15/16	20.8; 15/18	–	5.5; 3		–	1.9; 0/1	6.6; 4	24.8
Noxa/La Vanguardia	4–7 Apr 2005	900	?	46.5; 34/36	19.7; 16	23.2; 19	–	6.9; 3/5		? 0/1	? 0/1	–	23.3
Noxa/La Vanguardia	4–7 Apr 2005	900	?	42.9; 32/34	18.2; 15	21.4; 17/19	–	6.4; 3/4		0.6; 0/1	2.1; 0/1	8.4; 5	21.5
Ikertalde/GPS	1–7 Apr 2005	2,002	72.5	42.7; 34	15.8; 13	21.3; 18	–	6.7; 3		0.2; 0	2.6; 1	9.7; 6	21.4
Opina/Cadena SER	6 Apr 2005	?	?	45.7; 37/39	15.4; 13	21.4; 19/20	(4.6)	6.8; 5		0.2; 0	2.0; 0	1.2; 0	24.3
LKS/Diario de Noticias	30 Mar–6 Apr 2005	1,500	75	? 33/35	? 16/17	? 15/17	–	? 3/4		–	? 0/1	? 5	?
Opina/Cadena SER	5 Apr 2005	?	?	45.5; 36/38	15.3; 13	20.6; 18/20	(6.4)	6.7; 5		0.2; 0	2.3; 1	0.2; 0	24.9
Opina/Cadena SER	4 Apr 2005	?	?	45.5; 37/39	16.0; 12	21.5; 19/20	–	6.5; 4/5		–	3.5; 1	–	24.0
CIS	29 Mar–4 Apr 2005	1,495	?	42.5; 34/35	17.8; 16/17	22.2; 19	–	6.2; 4		–	2.7; 1	–	20.3
Opina/Cadena SER	3 Apr 2005	?	?	45.0; 38/40	16.0; 12	21.5; 18/19	–	7.0; 4/5		–	3.5; 1	–	23.5
Bergareche/Vocento	1–3 Apr 2005	3,100	?	40.4; 32/35	20.8; 16/19	18.3; 15/17	(6.9)	7.4; 4/6		0.3; 0	3.7; 1/2	–	19.6
Opina/Cadena SER	1 Apr 2005	?	?	44.8; 38/39	16.0; 12	21.0; 19	–	7.0; 4/5		–	3.5; 0/1	–	23.8
Celeste-Tel/La Razón	29 Mar–1 Apr 2005	801	?	42.9; 34/37	18.9; 15/18	22.9; 18/21	–	6.0; 3/4		–	1.6; 1	–	20.0
Opina/Cadena SER	31 Mar 2005	?	?	44.8; 38/39	16.6; 13/14	20.6; 17/18	–	7.0; 4/5		–	3.5; 0/1	–	24.2
CIS	22 Feb–16 Mar 2005	1,499	?	42.8; 35/37	19.1; 17	22.2; 18/19	–	6.2; 3/4		0.5; 0	1.2; 0	–	20.6
PSE	1–11 Mar 2005	?	?	41.2; 33/35	? 15/16	23.7; 21/22	–	? 3		–	? 1	–	17.5
Bergareche/Vocento	1–8 Mar 2005	3,100	?	43.3; 35/36	19.9; 16/18	20.4; 17/20	(5.3)	6.2; 3/5		–	3.2; 1/3	–	22.9
Opina/El País	24–25 Feb 2005	1,500	?	45.5; 36/37	19.5; 17	22.0; 18	–	6.5; 3/4		–	–	–	23.5
Ikertalde/GPS	18 Jan–2 Feb 2005	2,874	75.0	41.1; 32	15.8; 13	22.3; 19	9.4; 7	6.7; 3		0.3; 0	2.9; 1	–	18.8
CPS/EHU	8–26 Nov 2004	1,200	76	42.4; 33/35	18.1; 15/16	23.6; 21/22	–	5.8; 3		–	3.1; 1	–	18.8
2004 EP election	13 Jun 2004	—N/a	44.6	35.3 (26)	21.0 (17)	28.2 (24)	–	4.2 (3)	7.8 (5)	–	1.3 (0)	–	7.1
CPS/EHU	3–28 May 2004	1,800	75	43.7; 32/34	17.5; 14/15	25.6; 22/23	–	6.1; 3		(Note: Within PP.)	4.3; 2	–	18.1
2004 general election	14 Mar 2004	—N/a	75.0	33.7 (25)	18.9 (16)	27.2 (22)	–	8.2 (6)	6.5 (5)	–	3.1 (1)	–	6.5
CPS/EHU	3–21 Nov 2003	1,800	70	44.3; 33	24.1; 21	19.0; 16/17	–	6.7; 3/4			? 1	–	20.2
2003 foral elections	25 May 2003	—N/a	70.0	45.3 (35)	19.6 (16)	21.6 (17)	–	8.1 (5)		0.6 (1)	3.2 (1)	–	23.7
CPS/EHU	1–20 Nov 2002	1,200	?	42.1; 31	21.3; 18	19.0; 16	9.3; 6	6.7; 4			–	–	20.8
CIS	9 Sep–9 Oct 2002	579	74.2	38.8	21.1	19.1	7.9	5.6	5.6	–	–	–	17.7
CPS/EHU	15–30 May 2001	?	?	43.6; 33	20.8; 19	18.0; 14	9.8; 6	6.3; 3			–	–	22.8
CPS/EHU	2–21 Nov 2001	?	?	43.5; 33	21.0; 19	18.1; 13	9.8; 7	6.1; 3			–	–	22.5
2001 regional election	13 May 2001	—N/a	79.0	42.4; 33	22.9; 19	17.8; 13	10.0; 7	5.5; 3			–	–	19.5

=== Voting preferences ===
The table below lists raw, unweighted voting preferences.

Polling firm/Commissioner	Fieldwork date	Sample size	PNV	PP	PSE–EE (PSOE)	EH	EB–B	EA	UA	Aralar	PCTV/EHAK	Question	X mark	Lead
2005 regional election (Note: Does not include non-resident citizens.)	17 Apr 2005	—N/a	26.3	11.9	15.5	–	3.7		0.2	1.6	8.5	—N/a	31.0	10.8
CIS	29 Mar–4 Apr 2005	1,495	30.4	2.8	10.1	5.1 (Note: Results for Aukera Guztiak and Batasuna.)	4.6		0.1	2.2	–	30.4	11.3	20.3
CIS	22 Feb–16 Mar 2005	1,499	31.3	4.1	9.4	–	3.7		0.1	0.8	–	31.1	12.5	21.9
2004 EP election	13 Jun 2004	—N/a	14.0	8.3	11.2	–	1.7	3.1	–	0.5	–	—N/a	54.9	2.8
2004 general election	14 Mar 2004	—N/a	23.6	13.2	19.1	–	5.8	4.6	–	2.2	–	—N/a	24.1	4.5
2003 foral elections	25 May 2003	—N/a	28.4	12.3	13.5	–	5.1		0.4	2.0	–	—N/a	30.0	14.9
CIS	9 Sep–9 Oct 2002	579	20.6	3.8	6.0	3.8	3.8	2.9	–	–	–	40.7	16.1	14.6
2001 regional election	13 May 2001	—N/a	33.1	17.9	13.8	7.9	4.3			–	–	—N/a	20.1	15.2

=== Victory preferences ===
The table below lists opinion polling on the victory preferences for each party in the event of a regional election taking place.

Polling firm/Commissioner	Fieldwork date	Sample size	PNV	PP	PSE–EE (PSOE)	EH	EB–B	UA	Aralar	Other/ None	Question	Lead
Opina/Cadena SER	10 Apr 2005	?	42.5	10.8	16.7	–	–	–	–	10.7	19.2	25.8
Opina/Cadena SER	9 Apr 2005	?	41.1	9.6	16.9	–	–	–	–	11.5	20.8	24.2
Opina/Cadena SER	8 Apr 2005	?	42.2	9.7	16.0	–	–	–	–	10.4	21.6	26.2
Opina/Cadena SER	7 Apr 2005	?	40.8	10.0	16.0	–	–	–	–	10.0	23.3	24.8
Opina/Cadena SER	6 Apr 2005	?	44.0	9.8	14.7	–	–	–	–	8.6	23.0	29.3
Opina/Cadena SER	5 Apr 2005	?	43.9	9.2	14.9	–	–	–	–	8.4	23.6	29.0
Opina/Cadena SER	4 Apr 2005	?	43.1	9.4	15.4	–	–	–	–	8.9	23.2	27.7
CIS	29 Mar–4 Apr 2005	1,495	37.6	3.0	13.4	2.7	4.0	0.2	2.5	12.7	23.9	24.2
Opina/Cadena SER	3 Apr 2005	?	43.1	9.9	15.3	–	–	–	–	9.5	22.2	27.8
Opina/Cadena SER	1 Apr 2005	?	42.4	10.2	16.1	–	–	–	–	9.3	22.0	26.3
Opina/Cadena SER	31 Mar 2005	?	42.5	10.3	16.1	–	–	–	–	9.2	22.0	26.4
CIS	22 Feb–16 Mar 2005	1,499	38.3	5.3	12.6	–	4.6	0.1	1.2	5.7	32.2	25.7

=== Victory likelihood ===
The table below lists opinion polling on the perceived likelihood of victory for each party in the event of a regional election taking place.

Polling firm/Commissioner	Fieldwork date	Sample size	PNV	PP	PSE–EE (PSOE)	EH	EB–B	Aralar	Other/ None	Question	Lead
Opina/Cadena SER	10 Apr 2005	?	86.4	0.9	1.7	–	–	–	0.3	10.6	84.7
Opina/Cadena SER	9 Apr 2005	?	85.7	0.8	1.8	–	–	–	0.6	10.9	83.9
Opina/Cadena SER	8 Apr 2005	?	85.0	0.9	1.7	–	–	–	0.8	11.6	83.3
Opina/Cadena SER	7 Apr 2005	?	82.8	1.0	1.9	–	–	–	1.0	13.3	80.9
Opina/Cadena SER	6 Apr 2005	?	85.3	0.7	1.8	–	–	–	0.8	11.5	83.5
Opina/Cadena SER	5 Apr 2005	?	84.8	0.6	1.6	–	–	–	1.0	12.0	83.2
Opina/Cadena SER	4 Apr 2005	?	84.9	0.5	1.8	–	–	–	1.2	11.5	83.1
CIS	29 Mar–4 Apr 2005	1,495	81.1	0.5	2.7	0.1	0.2	0.1	0.7	14.6	78.4
Opina/Cadena SER	3 Apr 2005	?	85.2	0.9	2.1	–	–	–	0.8	11.0	83.1
Opina/Cadena SER	1 Apr 2005	?	84.1	1.1	2.4	–	–	–	0.5	11.9	81.7
Opina/Cadena SER	31 Mar 2005	?	83.8	1.1	2.4	–	–	–	0.3	12.4	81.4

=== Preferred Lehendakari ===
The table below lists opinion polling on leader preferences to become lehendakari.

Polling firm/Commissioner	Fieldwork date	Sample size										Other/ None/ Not care	Question	Lead
Polling firm/Commissioner	Fieldwork date	Sample size	Ibarretxe PNV	San Gil PP	López PSE–EE	Otegi Batasuna	Madrazo EB–B	Errazti EA	Benito UA	Zabaleta Aralar	Ezenarro Aralar	Other/ None/ Not care	Question	Lead
Opina/Cadena SER	10 Apr 2005	?	44.7	10.5	15.4	–	–	–	–	–	–	8.8	20.6	29.3
Opina/Cadena SER	9 Apr 2005	?	44.3	9.6	15.0	–	–	–	–	–	–	8.8	22.3	29.3
Opina/Cadena SER	8 Apr 2005	?	45.7	9.5	14.5	–	–	–	–	–	–	7.6	22.6	31.2
Opina/Cadena SER	7 Apr 2005	?	44.0	9.8	15.1	–	–	–	–	–	–	7.0	24.1	28.9
Noxa/La Vanguardia	4–7 Apr 2005	900	60.0	9.0	18.0	–	–	–	–	–	–	6.0	7.0	42.0
Opina/Cadena SER	6 Apr 2005	?	47.0	8.7	13.9	–	–	–	–	–	–	6.5	23.9	33.1
Opina/Cadena SER	5 Apr 2005	?	47.3	8.3	13.6	–	–	–	–	–	–	6.6	24.1	33.7
Opina/Cadena SER	4 Apr 2005	?	46.7	8.2	14.4	–	–	–	–	–	–	6.8	24.0	32.3
CIS	29 Mar–4 Apr 2005	1,495	42.9	3.8	11.2	–	3.0	–	0.3	2.1	–	16.1	20.8	31.7
Opina/Cadena SER	3 Apr 2005	?	46.0	9.0	14.2	–	–	–	–	–	–	7.8	23.0	31.8
Opina/Cadena SER	1 Apr 2005	?	44.9	9.1	13.6	–	–	–	–	–	–	8.5	23.9	31.3
Opina/Cadena SER	31 Mar 2005	?	45.1	9.4	13.3	–	–	–	–	–	–	8.1	24.1	31.8
CIS	22 Feb–16 Mar 2005	1,499	31.8	4.2	8.1	3.9	2.9	0.9	0.1	0.3	–	17.1	30.8	23.7
Opina/El País	24–25 Feb 2005	1,500	46.3	–	–	–	–	?						

=== Predicted Lehendakari ===
The table below lists opinion polling on the perceived likelihood for each leader to become lehendakari.

Polling firm/Commissioner	Fieldwork date	Sample size				Other/ None/ Not care	Question	Lead
Polling firm/Commissioner	Fieldwork date	Sample size	Ibarretxe PNV	San Gil PP	López PSE–EE	Other/ None/ Not care	Question	Lead
Opina/Cadena SER	10 Apr 2005	?	85.0	0.8	2.0	0.1	12.1	83.0
Opina/Cadena SER	9 Apr 2005	?	84.2	0.9	1.6	0.7	12.7	82.6
Opina/Cadena SER	8 Apr 2005	?	83.5	1.1	1.6	0.9	13.0	81.9
Opina/Cadena SER	7 Apr 2005	?	80.4	1.8	2.1	1.0	14.6	78.3
Opina/Cadena SER	6 Apr 2005	?	83.3	1.3	2.5	1.0	11.9	80.8
Opina/Cadena SER	5 Apr 2005	?	83.2	1.3	2.2	1.2	12.1	81.0
Opina/Cadena SER	4 Apr 2005	?	83.3	0.9	2.6	1.0	12.1	80.7
Opina/Cadena SER	3 Apr 2005	?	83.0	1.3	1.8	0.7	13.1	81.2
Opina/Cadena SER	1 Apr 2005	?	81.8	1.3	2.3	0.5	14.1	79.5
Opina/Cadena SER	31 Mar 2005	?	81.7	1.3	2.0	0.5	14.5	79.7
Opina/El País	24–25 Feb 2005	1,500	79.8	–	–	–	–	?

== Results ==
=== Overall ===
← Summary of the 17 April 2005 Basque Parliament election results →
Parties and alliances	Popular vote			Seats	
Parties and alliances	Votes	%	±pp	Total	+/−
Basque Nationalist Party–Basque Solidarity (PNV–EA)	468,117	38.38	−4.00	29	−4
Socialist Party of the Basque Country–Basque Country Left (PSE–EE (PSOE))	274,546	22.51	+4.75	18	+5
People's Party (PP)	210,614	17.27	−5.66	15	−4
Communist Party of the Basque Homelands (PCTV/EHAK)^{1}	150,644	12.35	+2.31	9	+2
United Left–Greens (EB–B)^{2}	65,023	5.33	−0.20	3	±0
Aralar (Aralar)	28,180	2.31	New	1	+1
Alavese Unity (UA)	4,117	0.34	New	0	±0
Greens–Anti-Bullfighting Party Against Mistreatment of Animals (B–PACMA)	4,049	0.33	New	0	±0
Internationalist Socialist Workers' Party (POSI)	2,354	0.19	New	0	±0
Humanist Party (PH)	1,514	0.12	−0.14	0	±0
For a Fairer World (PUM+J)	1,261	0.10	New	0	±0
Carlist Party of the Basque Country–Carlist Party (EKA–PC)	179	0.01	−0.03	0	±0
Blank ballots	9,001	0.74	−0.07		
Total	1,219,599			75	±0
Valid votes	1,219,599	99.67	+0.10		
Invalid votes	4,035	0.33	−0.10		
Votes cast / turnout	1,223,634	68.00	−10.97		
Abstentions	575,889	32.00	+10.97		
Registered voters	1,799,523				
Sources
Footnotes: ^{1} Communist Party of the Basque Homelands results are compared to Basque Citizens totals in the 2001 election.; ^{2} United Left–Greens results are compared to United Left totals in the 2001 election.

Popular vote
PNV–EA	38.38%
PSE–EE (PSOE)	22.51%
PP	17.27%
PCTV/EHAK	12.35%
EB–B	5.33%
Aralar	2.31%
Others	1.10%
Blank ballots	0.74%

Seats
PNV–EA	38.67%
PSE–EE (PSOE)	24.00%
PP	20.00%
PCTV/EHAK	12.00%
EB–B	4.00%
Aralar	1.33%

=== Distribution by constituency ===
Constituency	PNV–EA		PSE–EE		PP		EHAK		EB–B		Aralar	
Constituency	%	S	%	S	%	S	%	S	%	S	%	S
Álava	30.4	8	25.3	7	25.8	7	13.2	2	4.9	1	1.5	–
Biscay	40.7	11	23.2	6	17.5	5	10.0	2	5.5	1	1.6	–
Guipúzcoa	38.0	10	20.1	5	13.2	3	18.1	5	5.2	1	3.9	1
Total	38.4	29	22.5	18	17.3	15	12.4	9	5.3	3	2.3	1

== Aftermath ==
=== Government formation ===
Investiture
Ballot →	22 June 2005 (Note: 7 EHAK MPs cast invalid ballots in the 22 and 23 June votes.)		23 June 2005	
Required majority →	38 out of 75		Simple	
Juan José Ibarretxe (PNV): • PNV (21); • EA (8); • EB–B (3); • EHAK (2)	34 / 75	X mark	34 / 75	check
Patxi López (PSE–EE): • PSE–EE (18); • PP (15)	33 / 75	X mark	33 / 75	X mark
Abstentions/Blank ballots: • Aralar (1)	1 / 75		1 / 75	
Absentees	0 / 75		0 / 75	

== Bibliography ==
- Ley Orgánica 3/1979, de 18 de diciembre, de Estatuto de Autonomía para el País Vasco (Organic Law 3/1979). Official State Gazette (in Spanish). 18 December 1979 [version as of 22 December 1979]. BOE-A-1979-30177.
- Ley 7/1981, de 30 de junio, sobre Ley de Gobierno (Law 7/1981). Official State Gazette (in Spanish). 30 June 1981 [version as of 2 March 2005]. BOE-A-2012-5927.
- Ley Orgánica 5/1985, de 19 de junio, del Régimen Electoral General (Organic Law 5/1985). Official State Gazette (in Spanish). 19 June 1985 [version as of 29 November 2003]. BOE-A-1985-11672.
- Ley 5/1990, de 15 de junio, de Elecciones al Parlamento Vasco (Law 5/1990). Official State Gazette (in Spanish). 15 June 1990 [version as of 2 March 2005]. BOE-A-2012-2859.
- Decreto 2/2005, de 21 de febrero, del Lehendakari, por el que se disuelve el Parlamento Vasco y se convocan elecciones (PDF) (Decree 2/2005). Official Gazette of the Basque Country (in Spanish). 21 February 2005.
