= Accession Treaty of Spain to the European Economic Community =

Treaty of 1985

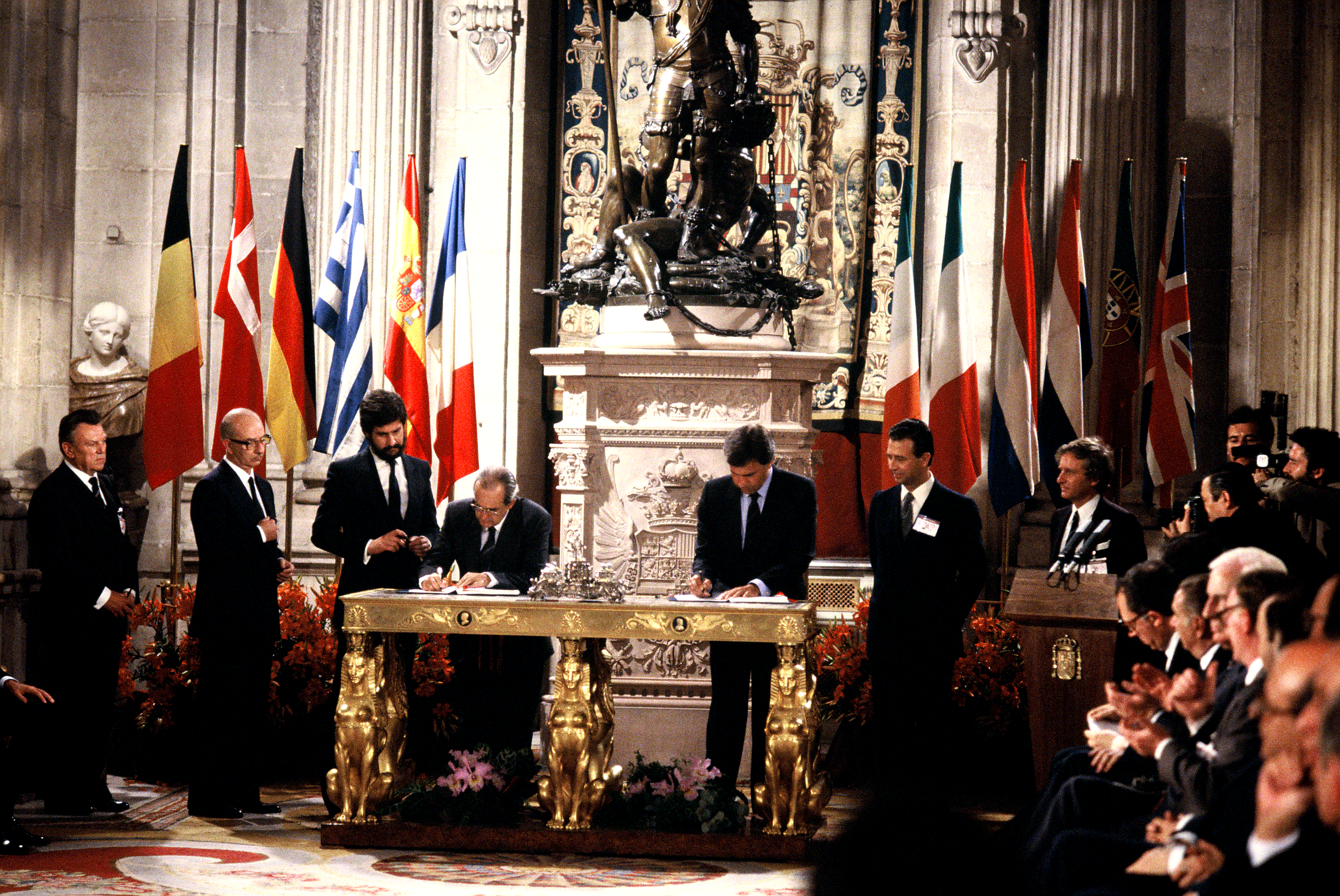
Felipe González and Fernando Morán sign the accession treaty on 12 June 1985, at the Royal Palace, observed by Manuel Marín, among others.

The Accession Treaty of Spain to the European Communities is a treaty for the accession of Spain to the European Economic Community —now the European Union— and was signed on June 12, 1985, in the Hall of Columns of the Royal Palace of Madrid to enter into effect on January 1, 1986. This incorporation was carried out at the same time as that of Portugal. Following this accession, Spain experienced a period of economic prosperity; during five consecutive years, it achieved the highest growth rate of the entire Community. This constituted the completion of liberalization in Spain, opening and rationalization of the Spanish economy after the National Economic Stabilization Plan in 1959. In addition to economic progress, this accession meant the end of the international isolation experienced since the Potsdam Declaration of August 1945, and the stabilization of the recently established democracy, marking the end of the Spanish Transition.

== Chronology of its incorporation ==
The first stance of the Franco government in the face of the constitution of the European institutions was to establish a waiting period in view of the development of events without defining an official policy. At the beginning of 1960, the Spanish Ministry of Foreign Affairs was considering three alternatives: joining the EFTA, joining the European Economic Community, or not opting for either of the two previous institutions. In this sense, in September 1960, a diplomatic mission to the EEC was established with the objective of gathering information and "waiting and seeing.". However, in mid-1961, events linked to the integration process led to a change of strategy in Spanish foreign policy with respect to the European project, as it became clear that the wait-and-see position and the real possibility of Spain's isolation was a dead end. For example, in this sense, the Directorate General of Foreign Policy, in October 1961, drafted a report in which it defended the need to make a political decision regarding the Common Market. Association with the EEC was chosen as the most appropriate way; the Foreign Office authorities thought that the Spanish economy was not ready for accession and that this also required a political homologation, which the Spanish government was not willing to accept.

=== The application for association ===
Spain applied for the status of an associated country to the European Economic Community for the first time on February 9, 1962, in a letter written by the Minister of Foreign Affairs Fernando Maria Castiella to the President of the Council of Ministers of the EEC, the French Maurice Couve de Murville: on the basis of "Spain's European vocation," its geographical situation, and its economic interests, the Francoist government requested in this letter "an association capable of eventually reaching full integration after completing the necessary steps to bring the Spanish economy into line with the conditions of the Common Market". However, since the EEC preferred Spain to have a democratic regime, accession was denied by a mere acknowledgement of receipt by letter on March 6. In fact, by that year, documents were being drawn up demanding that to become a member, they had to be democratic states:

- The Birkelbach report: on January 15, 1962, MEP Willi Birkelbach presented a report in the European Parliament entitled The Political and Institutional Aspects of Accession or Association to the Community, where this requirement was demanded. But it did not preclude other types of relations.
- Saragat Memorandum: in May 1962, the Italian delegation in the Council of Ministers requested that the basis of the political regime should have criteria like those of the founders. In this case it also prevented any association.
- The veto in the Council of Ministers of the Community: the ECSC, EEC, and Euratom Treaties required unanimity of votes in the council for the incorporation of new states. In addition, it had to be ratified by the respective Parliaments.

This requirement was made explicit in 1964 by the European Parliament:

States whose governments lack democratic legitimacy and whose peoples do not participate in government decisions —either directly or through freely elected representatives— cannot be admitted to the Community.

However, this was flexible and ambiguous as demonstrated by the various agreements with Greece and the former African colonies made prior to the Spanish request.

Thus, on February 14, 1964, the Spanish ambassador to the EEC Carlos Miranda y Quartín (Count of Casa Miranda) recalled the previous letter and requested talks with the Community. On this occasion, on July 2, 1964, the Council authorized the commission to carry out these exploratory conversations, which began on November 9, 1964. On November 23, 1966, the Commission issued a detailed report on the talks in which it recommended a two-stage customs formula for integrating the Spanish economy into the Community economy. It was not approved by the Council of Ministers and on July 11, 1967, it established, together with the working groups, a negotiation mandate.

The Spanish position with respect to European integration was one of distrust, since it clashed with the prevailing Spanish nationalism of the time and demanded an unforeseen democratization. Since the Franco regime could not survive in isolation, it had initiated economic liberalization in 1959 with the National Economic Stabilization Plan. In any case, for the Community, Spain was not a priority with respect to the negotiation of new candidacies, instead choosing to prioritize the United Kingdom's negotiations, which would have an effect on Spanish candidacy. There were also differences between the member states, such as Belgium (in which the position of the socialist president Paul-Henri Spaak stood out) and Italy, which did not admit Franco's Spain as an associated state; that of Federal Germany and France, which were in favor; and the undefined position of the Netherlands and Luxembourg. Among these conditioning factors were significant protests of the European left not to enter into relations with a government that did not respect human rights.

For all these reasons, the political solution was to negotiate with a purely economic purpose, which led to the signing of a Preferential Agreement initialed on June 29, 1970, which implied a reduction in tariffs between the EEC and Spain. This agreement provided for a reduction of 21% for agricultural products and 53% for industrial products, and 13% and 22% for industrial products, respectively. This was extended on January 29, 1973, with a Protocol.

=== Application for accession ===
During the political transition, a new application was made by the Spanish Government, presided by Adolfo Suárez, on July 26, 1977. Following this, the Commission approved the commencement of accession negotiations on November 29, 1978, beginning on February 5, 1979. This was a political decision to strengthen the incipient democracies of Greece, Portugal and Spain, but it entailed major economic difficulties given the lesser development of these southern European states and meant that the EEC would now have 329 million inhabitants, which entailed major institutional and economic changes.

At the same time, from the beginning of this new application, between 1977 and 1980, Spain had to fulfill several of the requirements for this adhesion in relation to the common European values and the respect for the dignity of the person:

- It ratified the International Covenants on Civil Rights and on Economic and Cultural Rights of the United Nations.
- It joined the Council of Europe (a body distinct from the European Community), where it signed the European Convention for the Protection of Human Rights and Fundamental Freedoms. It also subscribed to the European Social Charter and recognized the competence of the European Commission of Human Rights to deal with individual complaints.

=== The accession negotiation ===
==== UCD government ====
Enlargement process of what was initially the European Economic Community and later the European Union.

Although none of the nine states that made up the EEC at the time opposed the enlargement, the negotiations lasted more than six years, until March 1985. Greece's negotiations were completed much earlier, signing in May 1979 and joining on January 1, 1981. The European Community then consisted of the six veteran states: the Federal Republic of Germany, Belgium, France, Italy, Luxembourg and the Netherlands; and also those that joined in 1973, Denmark, Ireland and the United Kingdom.

Negotiations began in Brussels on February 5, 1979, with Jean François-Poncet as President of the council, and were attended by Leopoldo Calvo-Sotelo, as Minister of Relations with the European Communities, and Marcelino Oreja, as Minister of Foreign Affairs, on the Spanish side.6 At that time both parties were in a situation of change, both the Community, which was undergoing a profound process of transformation, and Spain, where the political forces were trying to reform the political system to achieve a democratic regime. In Spain there was unanimity among the political forces for joining the EEC, something that did not occur with other foreign policy positions with strong discrepancies in the relationship with the US and NATO membership and relations with the Third World (especially with the Arab and Ibero-America countries).

In relation to economic negotiations, Spanish agricultural production represented an increase of one third of Community production, with large surpluses of wine, fruit and vegetables, which competed with the production of France and Italy. On the other hand, the iron and steel industry and textile production were competitive, although less so than that of the Community, but this meant that there was reluctance on the part of the other member countries. The rest of the industry was made up of small and medium-sized companies that had been highly protected until then and were not problematic. The industrial sector, with decades of protectionism, given its weight in GDP and employment, was key to the economic success of accession, which was technically easier than agriculture, since a few general rules were applied, which was totally different from the latter, which had to be done almost product by product and was highly politically charged.

Subsequently, when Calvo-Sotelo became Vice-president for Economic Affairs on September 8, 1980, Eduard Punset was appointed Minister for Relations with the European Communities, for a short time, since this Ministry disappeared on February 27, 1981, to be taken over by the Ministry of Foreign Affairs, creating within it a Secretariat of State for Relations with the European Communities, which was taken over by the then Spanish Ambassador to the Community, Raimundo Bassols. At that time, negotiations were held on a monthly basis. Progress in the negotiations was conditional on the resolution of the Community's internal problems, as French President Giscard d'Estaing pointed out in a statement made on June 5, 1980. Negotiations were therefore limited to what was not affected by the reform. Following the coup d'état in Spain on February 23, 1981, the European Parliament requested on March 11 an acceleration of the accession negotiations to stabilize the fledgling democracy.

Following this failed coup d'état in March 1981, Leopoldo Calvo-Sotelo succeeded Adolfo Suárez. Unión de Centro Democrático, the political party that held power, was in decay. Foreign policy was centered on Spain's accession to the Atlantic Alliance (NATO), radically dividing the Spanish political forces, contrary to what was happening with the integration into the Community. The Falklands War between the United Kingdom and Argentina (April–May 1982) meant marked differences between the positions of support of the ten Community states with the British position and the lack of definition of the Spanish.

In the summer of 1981, the pace of the negotiations slowed down again, mainly due to the French request for a firm and precise commitment for the introduction of the Value-added tax to be adopted in the Spanish tax system (at the latest at the time of accession, if not before). During the autumn, the European Parliament reaffirmed the political dimension of the enlargement process, and recommended to the European Council and the Council of Ministers the adoption of January 1, 1984 as the latest date for the accession of Spain and Portugal to the Community.

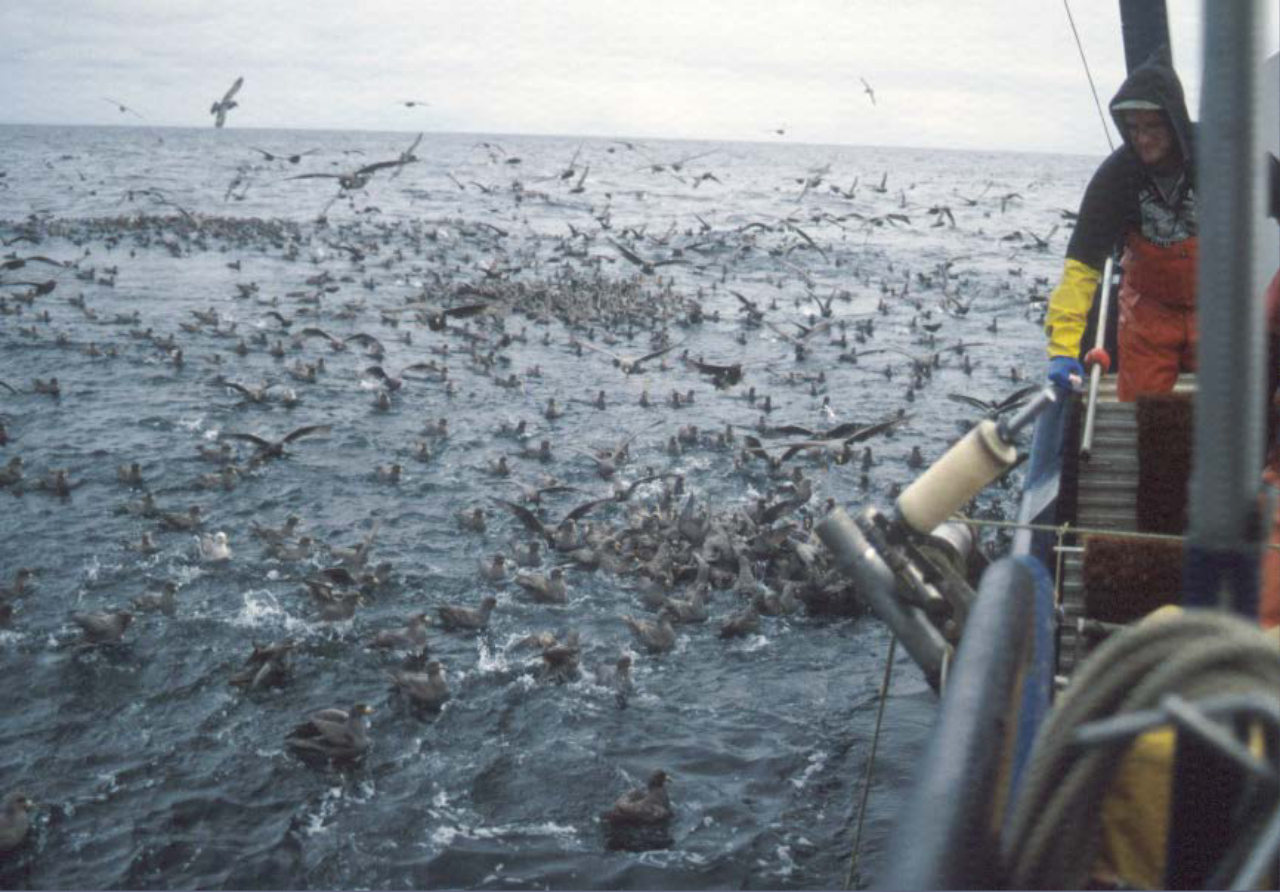
Fisheries, included in the same package as agriculture, was one of the tough battles in the integration negotiations.

==== PSOE government ====
After the elections of October 28, 1982, the Spanish Socialist Workers' Party won with an absolute majority and assumed the Government's reins. Previously, at the beginning of the same month of October, the previous UCD government dismantled another coup d'état. From then on, negotiations were in the hands of President Felipe González, with Fernando Morán in charge of Foreign Affairs and Manuel Marín —former Secretary of State for Fisheries— in charge of relations with the European Communities. This also meant a better understanding and a change of position with France, which in 1981 was also presided over by the Socialist François Mitterrand.

Since 1981, the European Investment Bank had begun to grant important loans to Spain to facilitate the adaptation of its structures, which was initially expected to be completed on the aforementioned date of January 1, 1984, but was successively postponed by the member states, especially by France, which, faced with the competition from Spanish products, pressured for the revision of the Common Agricultural Policy (CAP) prior to accession. At the same time, for budgetary reasons, the EEC was going through an internal crisis that made these negotiations difficult and prolonged. There were two chapters, agriculture and fisheries, that had not been dealt with, due to the Community's internal reforms. The accession negotiations coincided in time with the harsh industrial reconversion of the steel, naval, capital goods, and other sectors, which required significant amounts of public money.

The transitional periods that had to be agreed upon were left for the end of the negotiation. In any case, the negotiation had a global character, which meant that any partial agreements reached in the different chapters were subordinated to the final and global result.

Another attempt by the European Council to relaunch the reform, which was linked to the accession of Spain and Portugal, was made at the Stuttgart meeting on June 17–19, 1983. The reform of the Common Agricultural Policy, the reform of the Structural Funds, the implementation of new Community policies and the increase in own resources were discussed. Finally, the resistance of the EEC members was overcome when Felipe González accepted before Chancellor Helmut Kohl of the Federal Republic of Germany, the commitment of Western defense, with the acceptance of US missiles in the territory of the EEC members, which meant a link between the membership of the European Community and the political-military alliance with the USA. This turn of events meant that the government of the Spanish Socialist Workers' Party gave its support to remaining in NATO, which would be ratified in a referendum held in March 1986, once Spain had joined the EEC.

On March 29, 1985, during the Italian presidency of the Council of Ministers presided over by Giulio Andreotti, the accession negotiations were finalized, although some pending issues, known as "bangs", were left unresolved until June 6, 1985. It took 61 rounds, 29 of them at ministerial level, to reach the final agreement, with marathon negotiations lasting until late at night (this gave the Spanish delegation an advantage, according to the then Minister and later French Prime Minister, Édith Cresson).

Manuel Marín in the final stage of these difficult negotiations stated:

Spain is not willing to break the deck, but neither will it accept to enter the community by signing a treaty that could create a situation of insurmountable inferiority in the future Manuel Marín. Secretary of State for Relations with the European Community. February 17, 1985.

Overall, Spanish productivity was approximately half that of the EEC and in many sectors one third that of the Federal Republic of Germany. Among the agreements were established 10 years of transition for agriculture in general, adaptation aid for sugar beet in particular, as well as export quotas for milk, beef and cereals, and given the African swine fever that contaminated the sector, a special system of market regulation was considered for it. In the agricultural sector, there was a change from a system intervened and protected by Spain to another by the Community with different techniques and in a larger market, but without freeing it. Tariffs for general agricultural products were programmed to gradually disappear. Free trade in fruit, vegetables and olive oil was delayed until 1996 and the possibility of fishing in Community fishing grounds was set for 2003. For Spain's part, it obtained long deadlines for tariff reductions in the industrial sector, for the establishment of banks and insurance companies and for the liberalization of fiscal monopolies, such as petroleum and tobacco. A restriction on the free movement of new Spanish workers was maintained for seven years (ten years in the case of Luxembourg).

In the Accession Treaty there are few references to aspects of relations with Latin America, with the progressive application of the Generalized System of Preferences of Article 178 of the Accession Treaty (which prioritized the Community's relations with the so-called ACP countries: Africa, the Caribbean and the Pacific, granting them preferential treatment). A Joint Declaration of Intent is explicitly made regarding the development and intensification of relations with Latin American countries and the "Declaration of the Kingdom of Spain on Latin America". Exceptions are also included for products that Spain imports, such as tobacco, cocoa and coffee.

The negotiation of Portugal's accession was parallel and independent of this, and with different solutions. Finally, the relationship between these two States that were to join during their transitional periods had yet to be resolved. An agreement was reached between them bilaterally, which was later assumed by the European Commission.

Three particular cases arose in this integration: the Canary Islands, Ceuta and Melilla. The two North African cities would maintain their previous tax and tariff exemptions. In the agreement, the archipelago was excluded from the customs union, from the Community's agricultural policies and from the obligation to pay VAT. However, this was rejected by the Canary Islands Parliament, on June 22, 1985, i.e. after the signing of the Treaty, which meant that further negotiations were necessary, something that was possible since the Treaty of Accession allowed the conditions of integration to be modified on specific issues.

=== The signature ===
The flag of the European Community. It shares this symbol with the Council of Europe that groups almost all the states of Europe.

The accession treaty of Spain to the European Communities was signed in Madrid on June 12, 1985, by the President of the Government Felipe Gonzalez in the Hall Of Columns of the Royal Palace. Also present were the Minister of Foreign Affairs Fernando Morán, the Secretary of State for Relations with the European Communities Manuel Marín, and the Ambassador Permanent Representative to the European Communities Gabriel Ferrán.

Spain brings the know-how of an old nation and the enthusiasm of a young people with the conviction that a future of unity is the only possible one.

The ideal of European construction is more valid than ever, because it is imposed on us by the demands of today's world, and even more so by tomorrow's world.

Felipe González. President of the Government of Spain. June 12, 1985.

On the same day, a similar act took place in Lisbon ratifying the incorporation of Portugal.

A few days after this signature, on June 28 and 29, 1985, the Council met in Milan to initiate the reform of the EEC that would lead to the Single European Act in February 1986.

== The text ==
The text begins with an outline of the economic situation of both the Community and Spain, and points out the most problematic areas of accession in industry, agriculture and fisheries. Social, regional and foreign relations aspects are also described. A second part details all the points, described with some relevant data:

- Customs Union.
  - The European Economic Community-Spain Agreement.
  - Reassumption of the Common Customs Tariff and customs legislation.
  - Territorial application of the Customs Union.
- Agriculture and fisheries.
  - Agriculture: Spain's entry meant an increase of 30% of its agricultural area, 31% of its agricultural population and 31% of the number of its farms.
    - Structures: The structure was less efficient than that of the Community, with a deficit trade balance.
    - Production: Spanish agricultural production was 9% (4% in the Community) of its GDP and employed 20% (8% in the Community) of the active population.
    - Potential: there were good possibilities for improvement. The best assets are to be found in the products with surpluses (citrus fruits, fresh fruit, fresh vegetables, olive oil, rice, wheat and wine) with possibilities for revaluation. On the other hand, there was a deficit of others (barley, corn, vegetable oils and fats, eggs and beef, pork and poultry). Surpluses would be created in which the Community was sufficient (wine, olive oil and some fruits and vegetables) and, on the other hand, other surpluses would be placed in Spain (dairy and meat).
      - Prices.
  - Fishing: The Spanish fishing fleet ranked first in Europe and third in the world. Its gross tonnage represented two thirds of the Community fleet.
- Industry and energy.
  - Industry.
    - Iron and steel industry: with a competitiveness lower than that of the Community. With restructuring problems both in Spain and in the Community.
    - Shipbuilding: Spanish shipyards occupy third place in world production with a high level of competitiveness. It is another sector undergoing restructuring both in Spain and in the Community.
    - Textiles: also undergoing restructuring in both communities. It is similar to that of Italy and the United Kingdom, but lower than the rest.
    - Footwear: considered to be competitive.
    - Automobile: it is considered that the production can be assumed by the internal demand given that it had a deficit in motorization.
    - Ceramics: considered very competitive.
  - Energy: with greater dependence than the Community.
    - Nuclear energy: there was a plan to build nuclear power plants.
    - Solid fuels.
    - Hydrocarbons: oil refining capacity would increase the Community's existing surplus.
    - Gas.
    - New energies.
    - Non-proliferation treaty.
- Social aspects and movement of workers.
  - Social aspects.
  - Free movement of workers: it was considered that there was a risk of emigration from Spain.
- Regional aspects: it entailed an increase in the proportion of less developed regions.
- Foreign relations.
- Banks and Insurance.
  - Banking.
  - Insurance.
- Transportation.
- Competition and aid.
  - Rules applicable to companies.
  - Aid granted by States.
  - State monopolies.
  - Public enterprises.
- Taxation.
- Community budget.
  - Integration of the resources aspect.
  - Global financial impact.
- Other community policies.

== Political agreements ==
After Spain's accession, institutional changes were made to accommodate Spanish representation:

- In the Council: Spain, which was the fifth most populous country in the Community, obtained eight votes in the council, compared to ten for the four most populous countries. The qualified majority was set at 54 votes.
- In the Commission: Spain had two of the 17 commissioners who became members of the European Commission. The first were Manuel Marín and Abel Matutes.
- In the Parliament: 60 MEPs out of a total of 518 seats went to Spain. The first elections were to be held within two years. These were held on June 10, 1987. Until then, Spain would be represented in the European Parliament by 60 delegates elected on a proportional basis from the parliamentarians (deputies and senators) of each party.
- In the European Court of Justice: the number of Judges increased from 11 to 13, and the number of Advocates General from 5 to 6.
- In the Economic and Social Committee: Spain had 21 members.
- In the Court of Auditors: One representative from each of the member states was appointed.
- In the European Investment Bank: The number of vice-presidents was increased from five to six. This new vice-presidency was shared by Spain and Portugal. In the board of directors, Spain was assigned two seats and Portugal one. The alternate was to be shared by these two states. The Spanish Governor of the Bank is the Second Vice-president and Minister of Economy.

== Economic development after entry ==
=== In the first five years ===
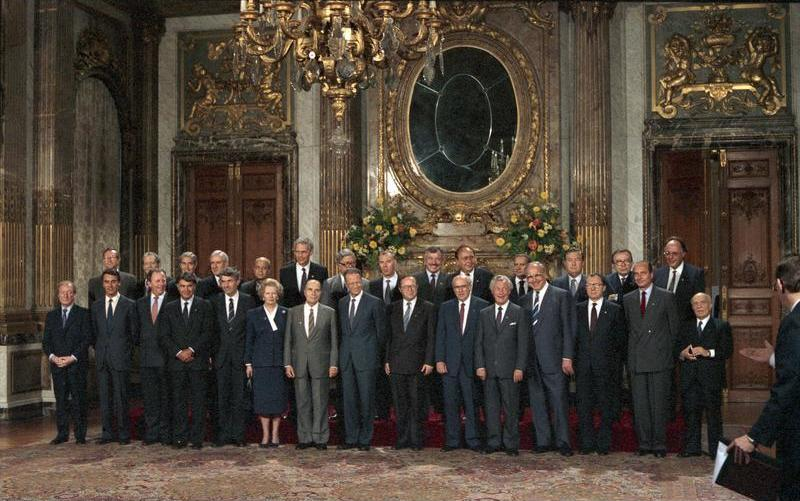
Family photo of the European summit held in Brussels in June 1987. Felipe González is fourth from the left in the front row.

Spain's post-accession economy grew faster than that of the other eleven member states. In 1985 the gross domestic product (GDP) was $164.25 billion and in 1989 (after four years in the EEC) it grew 2.3 times to $379.36 billion. Per capita income rose from US$4,290 to US$9,330. Investment in the industrial sector remained above 10%. This was especially significant in the three autonomous communities (Andalusia, Extremadura and Castilla-La Mancha) where there were extensive agricultural productions. On the other hand, livestock production in the northern communities suffered the most negative effect due to the high level of competition.

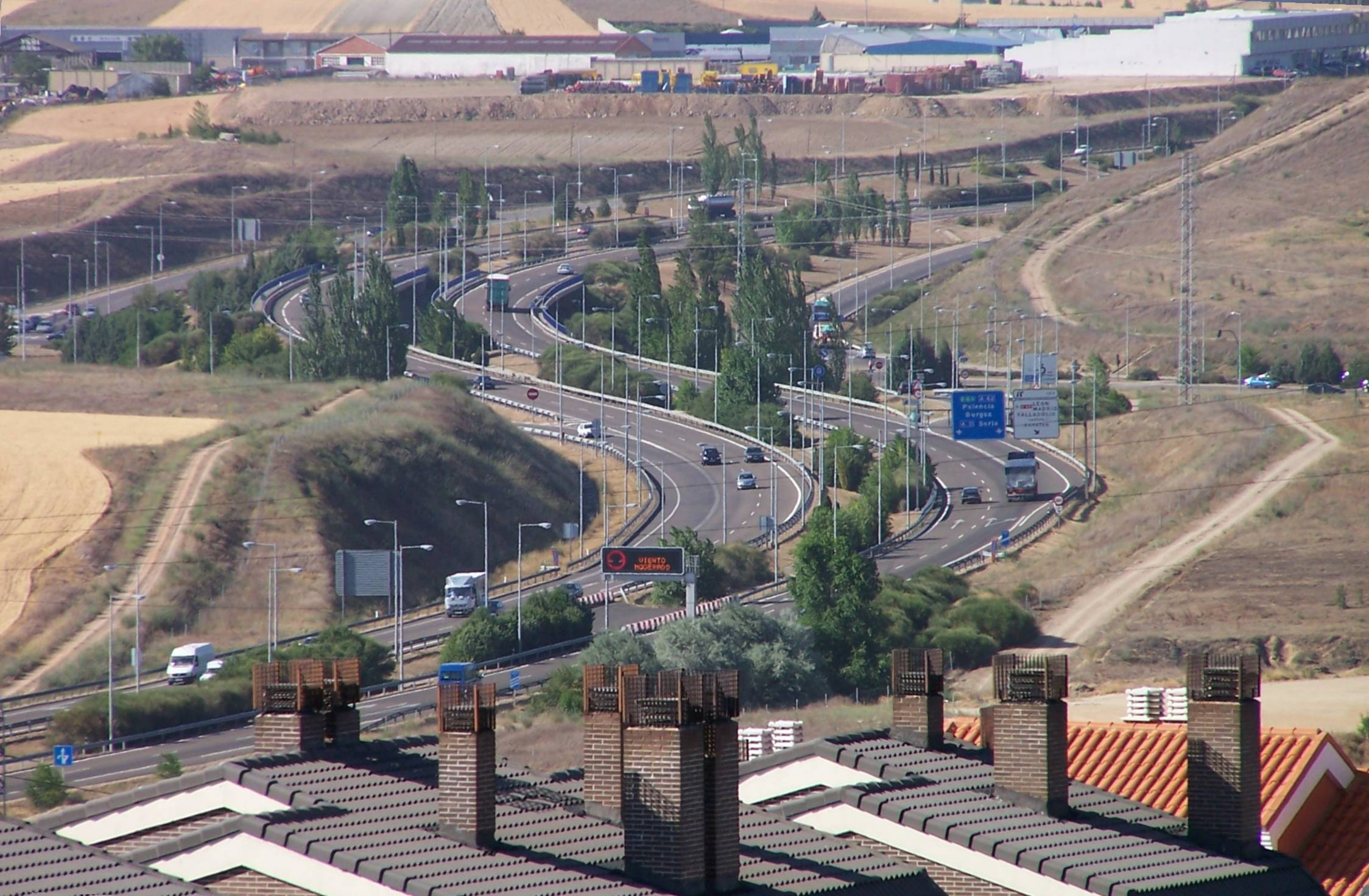
Forty percent of Spanish highways, like other infrastructures in recent years, are due to direct aid from the European Union.

The fishing fleet in the 1970s had become the fourth largest in the world (after the USSR, Japan and the US), but in this decade a significant drop began after the adoption of the 200-mile patrimonial sea of the Mediterranean and Atlantic countries. This led from a positive balance of 39 million dollars in 1978 to a negative balance of 228 million dollars in 1982. In the accession treaty, Spain had to comply with a series of limitations and controls until 1996. Although the first year of accession saw a recovery in fish production, the downward trend was not interrupted.

In terms of industry, modernization took place with foreign investment and the use of new technologies. The most dynamic sectors such as textiles, automobiles, shipbuilding and iron and steel had fewer obstacles than expected.

Unemployment rates, which in the 1980s were in double digits, reached over 20%. By 1991 it was at 16%. The trade deficit tripled between 1986 and 1991, more was bought from abroad than was exported.

=== Over a period of fifteen years ===
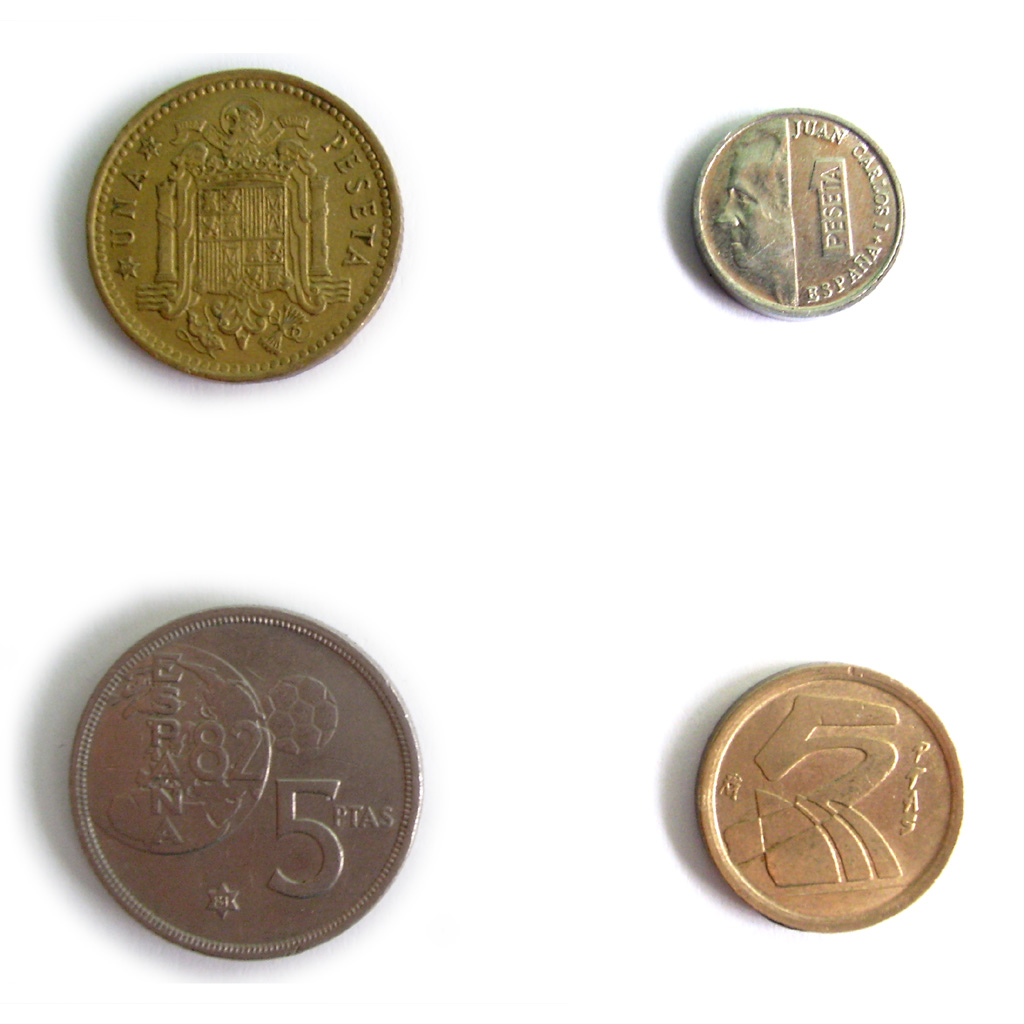
The value of the peseta, as well as its physical size, decreased until it was physically replaced by the euro.

In a period of fifteen years, this substitution was one of the main driving forces of the Spanish economy. In terms of trade flow, the sum of exports and imports, which in 1986 was 35.9%, rose to 62.2% in 2000. On the other hand, foreign direct investment in Spain increased from 1.4% to 6.6% of GDP, and Spanish investment in other areas of the world increased from 0.2% to 9.6% of GDP. This was mainly after sharing the macroeconomic pattern of the other members of the monetary union, i.e. the Spanish economy, traditionally an importer of capital, became a net exporter of capital. During this period, there was a sustained increase in the working population in Spain, exceeding that recorded in the EU, and only interrupted by the recession of 1992–1993. However, the labor market continued to suffer from several negative aspects, such as high rates of temporary employment and job rotation, high levels of female, youth and low-skilled unemployment. The criteria for economic convergence for the monetary union of the European Union Treaty — in Maastricht on February 7, 1992, where the EEC became the European Community— was a determining factor in the transformation of the Spanish economy, making it one of the most competitive in Europe. This adjustment took place mainly in 1997 and 1998, when there was economic growth accompanied by job creation. In addition, during this period, prices stabilized.

=== In twenty years ===
In twenty years the funds received from the now European Union (EU) were 0.8% of the Spanish annual GDP. The per capita income went from 68% of the EU average in 1986, to 89.6% in a Europe of the 15 richest countries and 97.7% of the EU 25. This direct aid from the EU created approximately 300,000 jobs per year, with major infrastructures built during these years, such as highways (40% of them), airport extensions, subways, ports and other public works. On the other hand, 90% of the investment made in Spain in 2006 is from the EU. Within Spain, growth was most pronounced in the community of Madrid, where the index increased by more than 30 points in the last two decades, above the European average, as did the Autonomous Community of Navarre, the autonomous community of the Basque Country, the Balearic Islands and Catalonia. When the Maastricht Treaty was signed in 1992, convergence conditions were created in which Spain did not seem to be able to enter the first phase of the euro. Since then, by the PSOE government and continued by the People's Party when it took office in 1996, a policy of controlling inflation, long-term interest rates and the public deficit was implemented, which led to meeting these criteria in 1998. On January 1, 1999, the third phase of the European Economic and Monetary Union began, in which the euro —initially called ECU— became the currency of Spain, together with other states of the Eurozone, although the peseta was physically replaced in the first half of 2002.

== Political aspects ==
The autonomous development took place at the same time as European integration. By 1988 Europe moved away from being a mere economic entity and in 1989 the construction of the European Social Space was formulated with the approach of the participation of all the citizens of the Community in local elections.

=== Remaining in NATO ===
NATO had vetoed Spain's entry due to its incompatibility with Francoism. This veto was not due to the dictatorial condition of the regime, since first with Portugal and then Greece and Turkey were part with those systems, but because the pro-Axis relationship in the Second World War was not forgiven. When the Spanish transition began, the facilities for joining this organization were maximum, quite the opposite compared to the obstacles for joining the EEC. Spanish society had no interest in this membership, since anti-militarist and anti-American attitudes predominated. The debates in public opinion and in the political class remained in ideological terms, while for NATO the interest was strategic because the enclave of the Iberian Peninsula is a vital trade and communication route, with a mountainous territory that would serve as a refuge in case of conventional war and many kilometers of coastline that give support to possible naval operations and also took into account the strategic Canary and Balearic Islands. The UCD and the president of the government Adolfo Suárez were in favor of the entry, because, given its geographical situation, neutrality would be impossible in case of conflict with the then USSR and thinking about the modernization of the Armed Forces in the technical and ideological field (in which a distrust of the democratic system dominated). It was also thought to include the usefulness in a hypothetical protection of the North African cities Ceuta and Melilla (claimed by Morocco, protection that NATO has always excluded) and to facilitate the possible recovery of Gibraltar (which NATO would never admit to leave its orbit) and finally it was linked to the integration in the EEC.

After the coup d'état of 1981, this entrance was prioritized by the government of Leopoldo Calvo-Sotelo, making the entry. Felipe González, from the opposition, defended a contrary position and requested a referendum. When Gonzalez came to power, after another advanced conspiracy to carry out another coup d'état in 1982, which took place in spite of being integrated into NATO, he found the EEC membership negotiations at a standstill and that they could only be unblocked by linking them with the support to this permanence. The latter limited it to a participation in the Military Committee and asked to comply with the promised referendum, conditioning it to the fact that it would be easier to win it if Spain was already integrated in the European Community. In 1985 there was another coup conspiracy planned for June 2, that is to say, for the eve of the signing of this treaty.

Felipe González, to fulfill the commitment to remain in NATO, to which he linked himself to advance in the integration negotiations, replaced Fernando Morán in the Ministry of Foreign Affairs by the more Atlantist Fernández Ordóñez, and called the promised referendum for March 12, 1986, actively supporting it. The result of the Referendum on the permanence of Spain in NATO was favorable in almost all the provinces, with the exception of nine provinces in which the result was negative: in the Basque Country, in Navarra, in Catalonia and in Las Palmas of the Canary Islands.

After the entry into the current European Union, no other conspiracy of the Armed Forces against the constituted civilian power is publicly known to have taken place. Although the one produced on the eve of this treaty was kept secret, without arresting or investigating the culprits.

=== Canary Islands ===
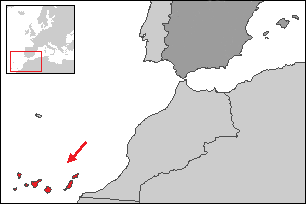
The African location of the Canary Islands, remote and dispersed in several islands, meant that the conditions for their integration into the EEC extended beyond the official entry.

During the integration negotiations there was unanimity that the Canary archipelago should be a point and apart given its African location and to maintain its historical, economic policy and fiscal peculiarities. This was assumed by the Spanish and Community negotiators, who had already considered special situations in the past, such as the overseas territories, the Faroe Islands, the Isle of Man or Greenland. However, in the archipelago the positions in terms of form and intensity became very varied and even antagonistic, marked also by the association between NATO membership and EEC membership. The position of the government of the Canary Islands, the socialist, Jerónimo Saavedra, was that of joining the Community but without Customs Union and without VAT. On December 1, 1983, the Canary Islands Parliament approved a directive in which it was in favor of accession but with specific negotiations, with economic and fiscal exceptions, protecting certain productive sectors and ensuring the investment of structural funds.

On June 22, after the signing of the Treaty, the Canary Islands Parliament met and rejected the agreement reached with respect to the Canary Islands, because it did not respect what had been approved in 1983, because it adversely affected agriculture and fishing and because it did not contemplate the economic and fiscal regime.

This meant continuing negotiations, since, according to the Accession Treaty, the EEC allowed the conditions of integration to be modified. At the end of 1989 the Canary Islands Parliament approved a change in relations with the EC, and in 1990 Francisco Fernández Ordóñez, Minister of Foreign Affairs, initiated the revision process. In December 1990, the Commission of the European Communities decided to modify a series of measures of the agricultural and fishing policy of the Community, the customs union and the fiscal regime, which implied an agreed timetable and a progressive implementation. A Specific Options Program for the Canary Islands (in Spanish: Programa de Opciones Específicas para las Islas Canarias, POSEICAN) was also submitted to the council. These measures were debated and modified by the Parliament of the Canary Islands in March 1991 and would become the legal basis for the Canary Islands' relations with the EU. These are complementary measures and financial commitments because the Canary Islands are considered an outermost region (together with the French overseas departments, Madeira and the Azores) and therefore have special conditions with preference in various areas: transport and communications; taxation; social aid; research and development and environmental protection. In addition, a Specific Supply Regime (REA) was approved, given the difficulties for the same.

=== The struggle against ETA ===
After Spain's entry into the EEC, one of the political changes that took place was the change in the fight against the ETA organization (very active during the political transition, which produced many fatal victims), both from the strategy applied in Spain and that of the European States, especially France. In 1986 the use of counter-terrorist terrorism was terminated, which in the last stage, that of the 1980s, was by means of the GAL (the last victim was in 1987), but which under other names had been carried out previously, with numerous fatalities.

From then on, the use of the dirty war was discarded and it was approached from the judicial, police and negotiation spheres. France began with an active collaboration with extraditions of ETA members that forced others to escape to South America and Algeria. Throughout this period, police actions have been combined (with very significant actions such as the arrests of its leadership), with legislative changes (Ley de Partidos, enforcement of the penal code) and its judicial application, with various negotiating episodes. These actions were also directed at organizations considered to belong to their environment, as was the one that led to the illegalization of Batasuna in 2003 (judicially this illegalization had been initiated in 2002) and the same negotiation with it prior to the truce of 2006. The most significant negotiations with ETA truces were three —1989, 1998 and 2006— however, there were contacts, some with truces not made public in 1988, 1992 and 1995.

=== European sentiment ===
Undoubtedly, Spain's entry into the EEC meant the end of political marginalization by the rest of the European states. In the first years, between 1986 and 1991, Spaniards had a very high European sentiment; in surveys they felt more European than the rest of the Community's inhabitants. From 1992 onwards, this feeling normalized and since then there have been the usual ups and downs.

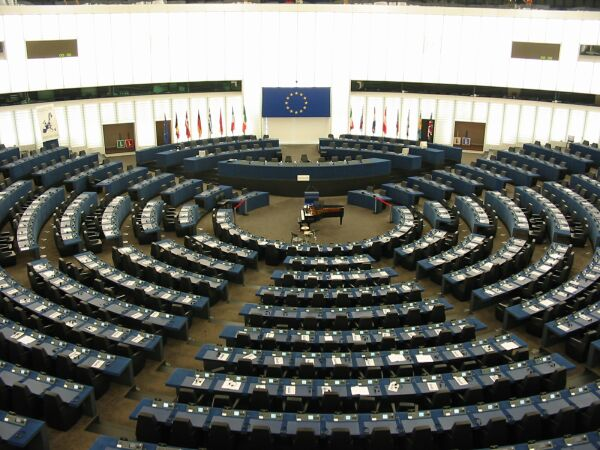
Interior of the European Parliament in Strasbourg. Participation in the election of its representatives is decreasing, both in Spain and in the rest of the European Union.

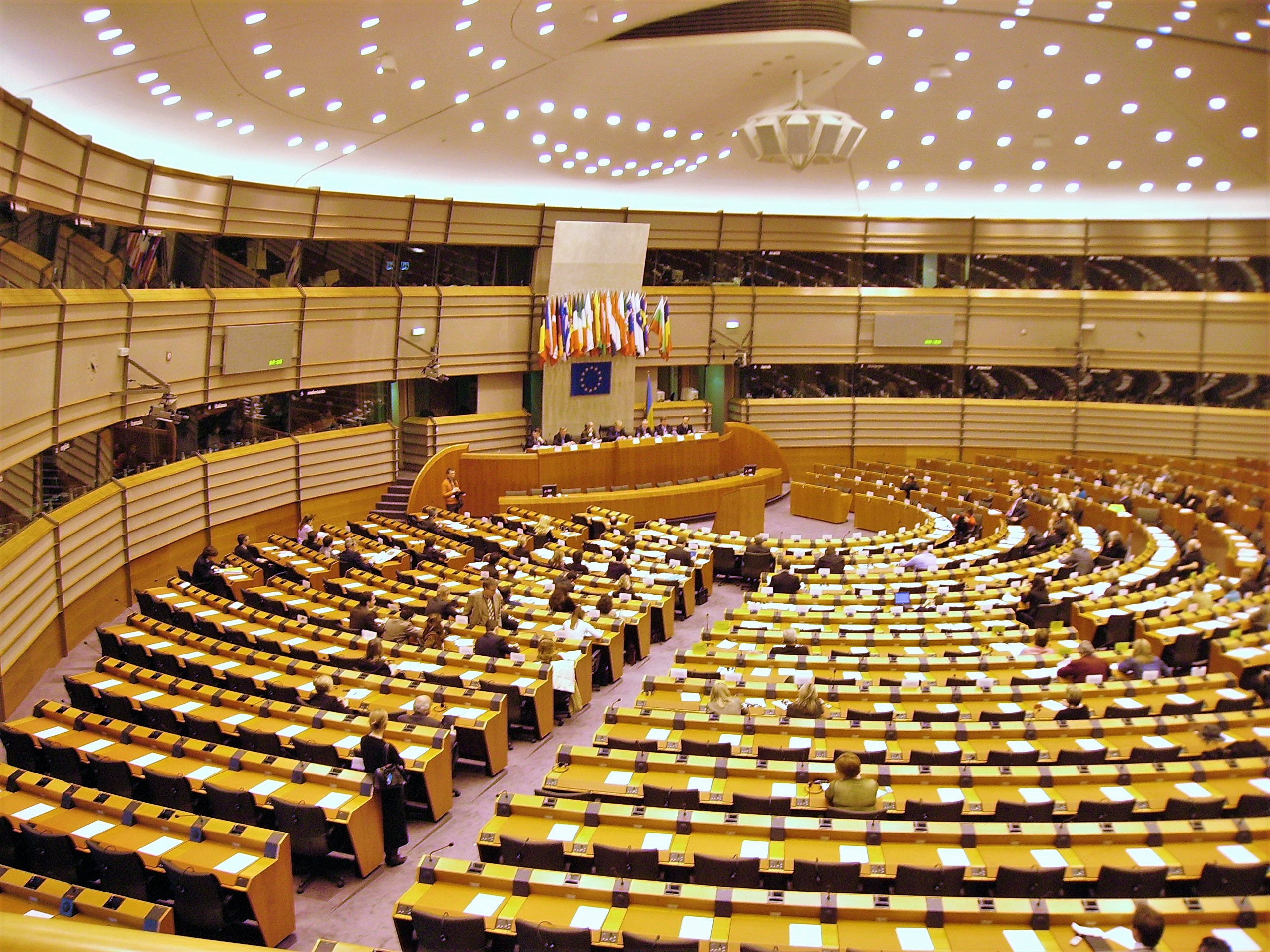
Inside the Brussels headquarters of the European Parliament.

In the 2007 Eurobarometer survey, 73% of Spaniards surveyed considered membership of the European Union to be a good thing, with 57% confidence in its institutions. This last perception is reflected in a drop in participation in the elections to the European Parliament, where in 2004 only 45.94% of the electoral roll voted, while in 1999 63.05% did so, a fact that was generalizable to the whole EU, with a participation of 45.5%. Moreover, this drop in turnout is not an exceptional occurrence, but a sustained trend since the first direct elections to the European Parliament. This profound disengagement from the European institutions is explained by the fact that the relevant decisions seem to be taken in the council, where the representatives of the governments of the States are already present, and no mechanisms of voter control are seen to exist. This trend of lower participation was confirmed in the Referendum on the European Constitution in Spain in 2005, where only 42.32% of the census went to the ballot box. In this referendum, where the "yes" vote won with 76.73% of the valid votes, in addition to the high abstention rate, the high percentage of "no" voters in the Basque Country (33.6%), Navarra (29.2%) and Catalonia (28.07%) stood out. In these autonomous communities a sector of the Basque and Catalan nationalist parties presented a position against the text because of the dominance of the States in the EU as opposed to the Peoples of Europe.

With respect to identification with Europe, in a 1996 survey, there were no significant differences between the voters of the different parties, with the only exception of the voters of Herri Batasuna who showed a significantly greater disaffection.

A qualitative survey, published in 2007, was carried out to deepen the feelings about Europe and Spain, where groups of Spaniards in contact with other European territories are analyzed in depth. It was carried out by two members of the Universidad Nacional de Educación a Distancia with 24 individual in-depth interviews and three discussion groups, conducted with former Erasmus students, returned emigrants and executives of European capital companies located in Spain. This study reveals the perception shared by all those involved that Spain has undergone an important and very positive change in recent decades, which has led to the disappearance of the "inferiority complex" towards the rest of Europe that it apparently suffered in the past. With a European identification, that in almost all cases is identified with the EU, at the same time with the Spanish feeling when outside Spain, although a difficulty of most Spaniards to identify with the official symbols, such as the flag or the anthem, relating it to the Francoist past and in general, there is a rejection of Spanish nationalism. In general, the interviewees share a very positive view of the influence that the EU has had on Spain, both in economic and modernization terms and in symbolic or prestige terms. In this study there is a significant difference between the interviewees who emigrated to work in low occupational echelons with a reinforcement of Spanish sentiment, but not of European sentiment, with respect to executives, current emigrants of qualified professionals and students of the Erasmus plan in which both sentiments are reinforced.

=== Latin America ===
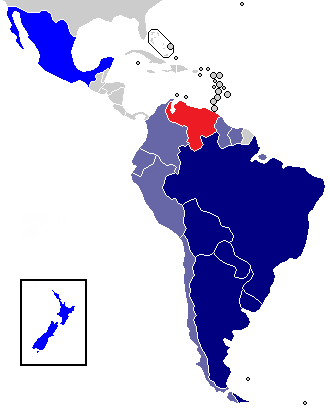
Member countries Associate countries Observer countries The creation of Mercosur, in addition to the Spanish initiatives after joining the EEC, was a determining factor in the strengthening of the relationship between Latin America and the European Union.

Initially, Spain wanted to include aspects of its special historical relationship with Latin America in the negotiations. It intended to use its advantages as a bridge country in foreign relations, as a Mediterranean country, as a neighbor of North Africa and its special relations with Latin America.

Previously, the EEC had a poor commercial relationship with Latin America for various reasons, some of which stand out:

- The world economic crisis in the 1970s, which caused a severe recession in EEC member states and led Europe to adopt a series of protectionist measures.
- The Lomé Convention and the Generalized System of Preferences, which prioritized the Community's relations with the so-called ACP countries (Africa, Caribbean, Pacific), granting them preferential treatment, marginalizing others.
- The indebtedness of Latin American states.

However, Spain at that time prioritized the internal situation of stabilizing its incipient democracy over foreign policy. Therefore, in the negotiations it was not possible to defend Latin America as a preferential area of action for the Community, neither in the sphere of its trade policy nor in that of development cooperation. The links between Spain and the countries of Latin America (especially those of Latin America) were much more intense in the political than in the economic sphere, something different from the relationship with the former colonies of other European Community States. This meant that there was no possibility of integrating this relationship into the negotiations. In the words of Fernando Morán, who later became Minister of Foreign Affairs in the final negotiations, and who had already discarded the idea of a bridging role in 1980:

The truth is that if the Spanish awakens more and more interest in Europe because of Latin America, the integration of Spain in the EEC requires a more accurate consideration of our relations. The adoption of the common tariff barrier and the effects of Community policies prevent us from maintaining a privileged regime for eventual overseas imports. England had to tackle the problem head-on, which is not our case: our relationship with Latin America does not enjoy a special regime and the Community countries with tariff barriers have increased their trade with Latin American countries in the same proportion as we have. Fernando Morán. 1980

In the Treaty, Spain only succeeded in having references to Latin America included in two annexed declarations:

- Joint Declaration of Intent concerning the development and intensification of relations with the countries of Latin America, common to the ten Member States of the European Communities, in addition to Spain and Portugal.
- Declaration of the Kingdom of Spain on Latin America.

A few exceptions are also included for products that Spain traditionally imports from these countries and to which the Spanish Declaration refers, such as tobacco, cocoa and coffee.

In this regard, there was no commitment in the Treaty that after Spain's accession, like that of Portugal, there would be a change in the Community's economic relations with Latin America and that it would no longer occupy the last place in the framework of its relations with the Third World.

Subsequently, once integrated into the Community, there was a Spanish initiative at the Council of Ministers in The Hague in the same year of accession, 1986, with proposals on the relations of the European Community with Latin America. This took the form of a document in June 1987 entitled New Guidelines for the European Community in its relations with Latin America. One year later, in 1986, the Council of Ministers in The Hague, at the initiative of Spain, entrusted the European Commission with the preparation of a proposal on the European Community's relations with Latin America, which was to take the form of the adoption by the Council of Ministers of Foreign Affairs of the European Community, held in June 1987, of a first document on Latin America entitled New Guidelines for the European Community in its relations with Latin America.

In the 1990s, with the incorporation of Spain and Portugal already consolidated, relations between the EU and Latin America were to intensify increasingly, producing a qualitative leap in terms of trade and economic negotiations. The third generation agreements were signed, based on the principles of democracy and human rights, in which the material areas of cooperation were expanded, as well as by the notable increase in trade, European investment and the unprecedented enlargement of development aid. The 1992 Treaty on European Union and the 1991 Treaty of Asunción establishing Mercosur made a decisive contribution. From 1994 onwards, with the fourth generation agreements, especially the Interregional Framework Cooperation Agreement between the European Union and MERCOSUR, signed on December 15, 1995, the situation of Latin America took on an increasingly prominent position in the EU's external relations, albeit with a certain stagnation in recent years.

=== Position of the political parties ===
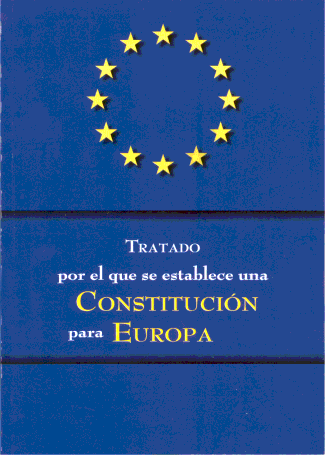
Cover of an edition of the Treaty establishing a Constitution for Europe. This Constitution was finally rejected in the French and Dutch referendums. In Spain it was not rejected, but participation was low.

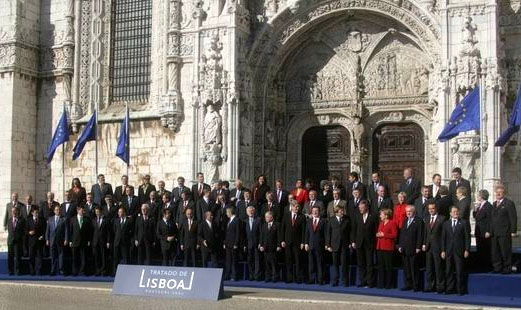
The new Lisbon Treaty of 2007, approved in Lisbon on December 13, 2007, most of the States will approve it in their parliaments, without holding a referendum, except Ireland because it is required by its Constitution. Although the latter rejected it in the referendum held on June 12, 2008, it was ratified in a second referendum held on October 2, 2009.

The accession to the European Communities had a consensus of all political forces. In the vote carried out in 1985 in the Congress of Deputies, there was a unanimous vote in favor. This was not the case in the accession of Portugal and previously in that of Greece, where the parties of the left were opposed (in the case of Portugal, the Communist Party and in Greece almost the entire left). In Greece and Portugal they were exclusive transitions characterized by the disaffection of part of the armed forces with respect to the dictatorial regime that caused them to put an end to it, and this reduced the risk of regression to authoritarianism; while in Spain it was an inclusive transition, resulting from a dictatorial crisis that did not imply a military disaffection, and therefore with a greater risk of involution.

- Parties throughout Spain (in some cases with an independent party but associated to the main one in some Autonomous Community):
  - For the Unión de Centro Democrático (UCD), with politicians coming from Francoism who wished to reform the regime with the leader Adolfo Suárez and who held power at the initial moment of negotiation, the political and economic model sought in the transition was that of Western Europe and therefore was the party that initiated the accession negotiations. This party disappeared from the political spectrum in 1983, before accession. Its leader later founded the Democratic and Social Center, a party that after several splits has little electoral weight.
  - The Spanish Socialist Workers Party (PSOE) and its associated Socialist Party of Catalonia (PSC) was simultaneously anti-capitalist, neutralist (rejecting NATO membership), democratic and pro-European. As already described, the PSOE subsequently changed its position with respect to NATO and was the one who led, from 1982 with Felipe Gonzalez as Prime Minister, the final negotiations for membership and subsequently remained in government and therefore responsible for the development of integration from 1986 to 1996 (which included 4 of the 6 years that were required for Spain to meet the criteria for monetary unification) and again since 2004 with José Luis Rodríguez Zapatero, until the present day. He maintains a pragmatic stance in favor of European federalism. It supported the referendum on the Treaty to establish a Constitution for Europe on February 20, 2005. On June 26, 2008, he supported the new Lisbon Treaty of 2007, approved in Lisbon, which on this occasion will not be endorsed.
  - During the transition, the party aligned with UCD was Alianza Popular (AP) with the leader Manuel Fraga, a former Francoist minister, who was also in favor of integration because they admired the Community economic model although they requested that the Spanish specificity be guaranteed against eventual European interference. This party evolved by merging with other liberal parties into the Partido Popular (PP) and its associate until 2008, Unión del Pueblo Navarro, which maintained Europeanism but sought in integration a reinforcement of the power of the States. This party was in the Spanish government from 1996 to 2004, with José María Aznar as Prime Minister, and achieved the fulfillment of the criteria for Spain to be in the first group of States to use the euro, a process that began with the previous PSOE government. He was also in favor of the European Constitution in the 2005 referendum. Favorable to the Lisbon Treaty that replaces the previous attempt.
  - The Communist Party of Spain (PCE) during the transition also had an anti-capitalist, neutralist (rejecting NATO membership), democratic and pro-European discourse. This party later joined the coalition Izquierda Unida (IU) and its associate in Catalonia Iniciativa per Catalunya Verds (ICV) together with other left-wing and ecologist forces. They maintain Europeanism but through a federal Europe in which priority is given to the citizens and a social component, rather than to the States. It did not support the Constitution for Europe for considering it antisocial and codifying in the law of laws the dismantling of the social conquests obtained during the second half of the 20th century. IU also rejected the Lisbon Treaty, while ICV abstained.
  - Unión Progreso y Democracia (UPyD) emerged in 2007. It voted in favor of the new EU Treaty.
- Nationalist parties in the autonomous communities: in general they have pro-European positions, but are critical of the political construction carried out. They make coalitions for the European Parliament since Spain is a single constituency:
  - Galeusca coalition constituted by Convergencia i Unió (CiU) and Partido Nacionalista Vasco (PNV) that were present in the transition supporting the accession. In the referendum on the European Constitution they supported it critically. The Bloc Nacionalista Valencià (BLOC), Partit Socialista de Mallorca – Entesa Nacionalista and finally the Bloque Nacionalista Galego (BNG) are also part of the coalition, which was Eurosceptic and against the entry into the EEC because it considered this organization complementary to NATO and of the same imperialist character. For this reason, the latter was against the European Constitution. PNV and CIU approved the Lisbon Treaty of 2007. While BNG rejected it.
  - Europe of the Peoples, coalition of parties that did not have representation in the Congress of Deputies during the integration process. Esquerra Republicana de Catalunya (ERC), Eusko Alkartasuna (EA), Chunta Aragonesista (CHA), Partido Socialista de Andalucía (PSA), Andecha Astur (AA), Conceju Nacionaliegu Cántabru (CNC) and Iniciativa Ciudadana de La Rioja (ICLR). They are in favor of the EU but took a position against the European Constitution because they considered that it consolidated the power of the States, closing the way to the peoples and Euroregions. Nafarroa Bai (Na Bai) is in the same position. Na Bai, the only one present in the Congress of Deputies, abstained on the 2007 Lisbon Treaty.
  - Herri Batasuna, considered Eurosceptic, presented an undefined position with respect to the accession. Subsequently, it participated in the elections to the European Parliament obtaining 363,000 votes, of which 112,000 from outside Euskal Herria, being the most voted force in the whole of this territory Hegoalde (Basque Country and Navarra). It won seats on three occasions (1987, 1989 and 1999). In 2000 it split into two parties: Batasuna, which did not reject the terrorist actions of ETA until 2010 and was outlawed in 2002 and Aralar, which rejects these actions and with a pro-European stance advocating a Europe based on the right of self-determination of peoples and in defense of all human and social rights. For this reason it rejected the European Constitution. Both Aralar and the outlawed nationalist left obtained representation in the 2011 elections in the Amaiur coalition, with one deputy belonging to Aralar, one to Eusko Alkartasuna, a former ANV mayor, a professor and former HB and EH parliamentarian, a lawyer for Basque prisoners, an EHNE (Euskal Herriko Nekazarien Elkartasuna) trade unionist and an LAB trade unionist.
- Regionalist parties, also of scope in some autonomous communities: pro-European and that supported the Treaty of the European Constitution in the referendum of 2005:
  - Those grouped in European Coalition in the 2004 elections, are center-right regionalists, which include Coalición Canaria (CC), Partido Aragonés (PA), Partido Andalucista, Unió Valenciana, Convergencia de Demócratas de Navarra and Unió Mallorquina. Of these, the CC, which is represented in the Congress of Deputies, was in favor of the Lisbon Treaty.
  - Those integrated in the Federation of Regional Parties also of center-right: Unión Valenciana (UV), Partido Regionalista de Cantabria (PRC), Extremadura Unida (EU), Partido Riojano Progresista (PRP), Unión del Pueblo Melillense (UPM) and Partido Regional de Madrid (PRM). They are not represented in the Congress of Deputies.
  - Unión del Pueblo Navarro (UPN), right-wing, which until 2008 carried out common policy with the PP. UPN supported the new Lisbon Treaty in the Congress of Deputies.

== See also ==
- Potential enlargement of the European Union
- Enlargement of the European Union
