= 2007 Basque foral elections =

Elections in the Spanish region of the Basque Country

Foral elections were held in the Basque Country on 27 May 2007 to elect the 8th General Assemblies of Álava, Biscay and Guipúzcoa. All 153 seats in the three General Assemblies were up for election. They were held concurrently with regional elections in thirteen autonomous communities and local elections all across Spain.

== Overall ==
← Summary of the 27 May 2007 Basque foral election results →
Parties and alliances	Popular vote			Seats	
Parties and alliances	Votes	%	±pp	Total	+/−
Basque Nationalist Party (EAJ/PNV)^{1}	320,087	34.05	n/a	53	+1
Socialist Party of the Basque Country–Basque Country Left (PSE–EE (PSOE))	245,996	26.17	+4.60	44	+9
People's Party (PP)	159,645	16.98	−2.62	29	−5
United Left–Greens–Aralar (EB–B–Aralar)^{2}	88,112	9.37	−1.89	12	+2
Basque Solidarity (EA)^{1}	69,945	7.44	n/a	10	−11
Basque Nationalist Action (EAE/ANV)	28,227	3.00	New	5	+5
The Greens (B/LV)	4,895	0.52	New	0	±0
We, the Women of the Plaza (Plazandreok)	1,533	0.16	+0.07	0	±0
Humanist Party (PH)	1,068	0.11	+0.03	0	±0
Carlist Party of the Basque Country–Carlist Party (EKA–PC)	464	0.05	±0.00	0	±0
Democratic Innovation (InnDe)	136	0.01	New	0	±0
Alavese Unity (UA)	n/a	n/a	−0.56	0	−1
Blank ballots	19,810	2.11	+0.65		
Total	939,918			153	±0
Valid votes	939,918	87.47	−2.11		
Invalid votes	134,604	12.53	+2.11		
Votes cast / turnout	1,074,522	60.65	−9.32		
Abstentions	697,250	39.35	+9.32		
Registered voters	1,771,772				
Sources
Footnotes: ^{1} Within the Basque Nationalist Party–Basque Solidarity alliance in the 2003 elections.; ^{2} United Left–Greens–Aralar results are compared to the combined totals of United Left and Aralar in the 2003 elections.

Popular vote
EAJ/PNV	34.05%
PSE–EE (PSOE)	26.17%
PP	16.98%
EB–B–Aralar	9.37%
EA	7.44%
EAE/ANV	3.00%
Others	0.86%
Blank ballots	2.11%

== Deputation control ==
The following table lists party control in the foral deputations. Gains for a party are highlighted in that party's colour.

Province	Population	Previous control	New control
Álava	301,926	People's Party (PP)	Basque Nationalist Party (EAJ/PNV)
Biscay	1,139,863	Basque Nationalist Party (EAJ/PNV)	Basque Nationalist Party (EAJ/PNV)
Guipúzcoa	691,895	Basque Nationalist Party (EAJ/PNV)	Basque Nationalist Party (EAJ/PNV)

== Historical territories ==
=== Álava ===
← Summary of the 27 May 2007 General Assembly of Álava election results →
Parties and alliances	Popular vote			Seats	
Parties and alliances	Votes	%	±pp	Total	+/−
People's Party (PP)	39,765	25.93	−2.55	15	−1
Socialist Party of the Basque Country–Basque Country Left (PSE–EE (PSOE))	39,596	25.82	+4.32	14	+2
Basque Nationalist Party (EAJ/PNV)^{1}	39,055	25.46	n/a	14	±0
Basque Nationalist Action (EAE/ANV)	13,151	8.57	New	4	+4
United Left–Greens–Aralar (EB–B–Aralar)^{2}	10,201	6.65	−2.66	2	−1
Basque Solidarity (EA)^{1}	8,692	5.67	n/a	2	−3
Democratic Innovation (InnDe)	136	0.09	New	0	±0
Alavese Unity (UA)	n/a	n/a	−3.83	0	−1
Blank ballots	2,772	1.81	+0.46		
Total	153,368			51	±0
Valid votes	153,368	96.99	+3.43		
Invalid votes	4,756	3.01	−3.43		
Votes cast / turnout	158,124	63.82	−8.20		
Abstentions	89,634	36.18	+8.20		
Registered voters	247,758				
Sources
Footnotes: ^{1} Within the Basque Nationalist Party–Basque Solidarity alliance in the 2003 election.; ^{2} United Left–Greens–Aralar results are compared to the combined totals of United Left and Aralar in the 2003 election.

=== Biscay ===
← Summary of the 27 May 2007 General Assembly of Biscay election results →
Parties and alliances	Popular vote			Seats	
Parties and alliances	Votes	%	±pp	Total	+/−
Basque Nationalist Party (EAJ/PNV)^{1}	209,237	40.08	n/a	23	+1
Socialist Party of the Basque Country–Basque Country Left (PSE–EE (PSOE))	129,532	24.81	+4.30	14	+3
People's Party (PP)	84,863	16.26	−3.36	8	−2
United Left–Greens–Aralar (EB–B–Aralar)^{2}	41,122	7.88	−3.21	4	+1
Basque Solidarity (EA)^{1}	27,104	5.19	n/a	1	−4
Basque Nationalist Action (EAE/ANV)	15,076	2.89	New	1	+1
The Greens (B/LV)	3,881	0.74	New	0	±0
Humanist Party (PH)	1,068	0.20	+0.06	0	±0
Carlist Party of the Basque Country–Carlist Party (EKA–PC)	464	0.09	+0.03	0	±0
Blank ballots	9,704	1.86	+0.39		
Total	522,051			51	±0
Valid votes	522,051	90.17	−1.65		
Invalid votes	56,885	9.83	+1.65		
Votes cast / turnout	578,936	60.35	−10.06		
Abstentions	380,339	39.65	+10.06		
Registered voters	959,275				
Sources
Footnotes: ^{1} Within the Basque Nationalist Party–Basque Solidarity alliance in the 2003 election.; ^{2} United Left–Greens–Aralar results are compared to the combined totals of United Left and Aralar in the 2003 election.

=== Guipúzcoa ===
← Summary of the 27 May 2007 General Assembly of Guipúzcoa election results →
Parties and alliances	Popular vote			Seats	
Parties and alliances	Votes	%	±pp	Total	+/−
Socialist Party of the Basque Country–Basque Country Left (PSE–EE (PSOE))	76,868	29.06	+5.46	16	+4
Basque Nationalist Party (EAJ/PNV)^{1}	71,795	27.14	n/a	16	±0
United Left–Greens–Aralar (EB–B–Aralar)^{2}	36,789	13.91	+1.35	6	+2
People's Party (PP)	35,017	13.24	−1.87	6	−2
Basque Solidarity (EA)^{1}	34,149	12.91	n/a	7	−4
We, the Women of the Plaza (Plazandreok)	1,533	0.58	+0.29	0	±0
The Greens (B/LV)	1,014	0.38	New	0	±0
Blank ballots	7,334	2.77	+1.26		
Total	264,499			51	±0
Valid votes	264,499	78.59	−5.33		
Invalid votes	72,063	21.41	+5.33		
Votes cast / turnout	336,562	59.60	−8.75		
Abstentions	228,177	40.40	+8.75		
Registered voters	564,739				
Sources
Footnotes: ^{1} Within the Basque Nationalist Party–Basque Solidarity alliance in the 2003 election.; ^{2} United Left–Greens–Aralar results are compared to the combined totals of United Left and Aralar in the 2003 election.
