= 1995 Basque foral elections =

Elections in the Spanish region of the Basque Country

Foral elections were held in the Basque Country on 28 May 1995 to elect the 5th General Assemblies of Álava, Biscay and Guipúzcoa. All 153 seats in the three General Assemblies were up for election. They were held concurrently with regional elections in thirteen autonomous communities and local elections all across Spain.

== Overall ==
← Summary of the 28 May 1995 Basque foral election results →
Parties and alliances	Popular vote			Seats	
Parties and alliances	Votes	%	±pp	Total	+/−
Basque Nationalist Party (EAJ/PNV)	315,621	28.37	−1.19	47	±0
Socialist Party of the Basque Country–Basque Country Left (PSE–EE (PSOE))^{1}	185,972	16.72	−9.84	26	−14
People's Party (PP)	171,973	15.46	+7.42	25	+16
Popular Unity (HB)	160,552	14.43	−2.97	20	−7
Basque Solidarity (EA)	120,960	10.87	−1.54	15	−4
United Left (IU/EB)	90,434	8.13	+6.33	9	+9
Alavese Unity (UA)	23,442	2.11	−0.14	9	−2
Basque Citizen Initiative (ICV–Gorordo)	20,383	1.83	New	2	+2
Abanto Municipal Group (AMA)	824	0.07	New	0	±0
Platform of Independents of Spain (PIE)	601	0.05	New	0	±0
Basque Country Greens (EHB)	472	0.04	−0.29	0	±0
Public Hats (Herri-Hats)	446	0.04	New	0	±0
Carlist Party (EKA/PC)	185	0.02	−0.04	0	±0
Democratic and Social Centre (CDS)	123	0.01	−0.52	0	±0
Blank ballots	20,352	1.83	+0.88		
Total	1,112,340			153	±0
Valid votes	1,112,340	99.07	−0.09		
Invalid votes	10,399	0.93	+0.09		
Votes cast / turnout	1,122,739	63.92	+4.89		
Abstentions	633,796	36.08	−4.89		
Registered voters	1,756,535				
Sources
Footnotes: ^{1} Socialist Party of the Basque Country–Basque Country Left results are compared to the combined totals of the Socialist Party of the Basque Country and Basque Country Left in the 1991 elections.

Popular vote
EAJ/PNV	28.37%
PSE–EE (PSOE)	16.72%
PP	15.46%
HB	14.43%
EA	10.87%
IU/EB	8.13%
UA	2.11%
ICV–Gorordo	1.83%
Others	0.24%
Blank ballots	1.83%

== Deputation control ==
The following table lists party control in the foral deputations. Gains for a party are highlighted in that party's colour.

Province	Population	Previous control	New control
Álava	281,703	Basque Nationalist Party (EAJ/PNV)	Basque Nationalist Party (EAJ/PNV)
Biscay	1,164,772	Basque Nationalist Party (EAJ/PNV)	Basque Nationalist Party (EAJ/PNV)
Guipúzcoa	684,714	Basque Nationalist Party (EAJ/PNV)	Basque Nationalist Party (EAJ/PNV)

== Historical territories ==
=== Álava ===
← Summary of the 28 May 1995 General Assembly of Álava election results →
Parties and alliances	Popular vote			Seats	
Parties and alliances	Votes	%	±pp	Total	+/−
Basque Nationalist Party (EAJ/PNV)	38,126	26.04	+0.20	15	+1
People's Party (PP)	25,077	17.13	+8.34	9	+6
Alavese Unity (UA)	23,442	16.01	−2.29	9	−2
Socialist Party of the Basque Country–Basque Country Left (PSE–EE (PSOE))^{1}	21,099	14.41	−8.18	7	−6
Popular Unity (HB)	13,330	9.10	−2.27	4	−3
Basque Solidarity (EA)	11,500	7.85	−0.81	4	+1
United Left (IU/EB)	11,400	7.79	+6.70	3	+3
Blank ballots	2,458	1.68	+0.68		
Total	146,432			51	±0
Valid votes	146,432	99.03	+0.06		
Invalid votes	1,435	0.97	−0.06		
Votes cast / turnout	147,867	64.33	+6.62		
Abstentions	82,006	35.67	−6.62		
Registered voters	229,873				
Sources
Footnotes: ^{1} Socialist Party of the Basque Country–Basque Country Left results are compared to the combined totals of the Socialist Party of the Basque Country and Basque Country Left in the 1990 election.

=== Biscay ===
← Summary of the 28 May 1995 General Assembly of Biscay election results →
Parties and alliances	Popular vote			Seats	
Parties and alliances	Votes	%	±pp	Total	+/−
Basque Nationalist Party (EAJ/PNV)	201,469	33.22	−2.60	20	−1
Socialist Party of the Basque Country–Basque Country Left (PSE–EE (PSOE))^{1}	102,575	16.91	−10.65	10	−4
People's Party (PP)	99,662	16.43	+7.62	9	+5
Popular Unity (HB)	71,967	11.87	−3.56	5	−3
United Left (IU/EB)	56,515	9.32	+6.90	4	+4
Basque Solidarity (EA)	42,278	6.97	−0.98	1	−3
Basque Citizen Initiative (ICV–Gorordo)	20,383	3.36	New	2	+2
Abanto Municipal Group (AMA)	824	0.14	New	0	±0
Platform of Independents of Spain (PIE)	601	0.10	New	0	±0
Blank ballots	10,166	1.68	+0.71		
Total	606,440			51	±0
Valid votes	606,440	99.05	−0.08		
Invalid votes	5,814	0.95	+0.08		
Votes cast / turnout	612,254	63.69	+5.56		
Abstentions	348,992	36.31	−5.56		
Registered voters	961,246				
Sources
Footnotes: ^{1} Socialist Party of the Basque Country–Basque Country Left results are compared to the combined totals of the Socialist Party of the Basque Country and Basque Country Left in the 1990 election.

=== Guipúzcoa ===
← Summary of the 28 May 1995 General Assembly of Guipúzcoa election results →
Parties and alliances	Popular vote			Seats	
Parties and alliances	Votes	%	±pp	Total	+/−
Basque Nationalist Party (EAJ/PNV)	76,026	21.15	+0.41	12	±0
Popular Unity (HB)	75,255	20.94	−1.89	11	−1
Basque Solidarity (EA)	67,182	18.69	−2.38	10	−2
Socialist Party of the Basque Country–Basque Country Left (PSE–EE (PSOE))^{1}	62,298	17.33	−9.05	9	−4
People's Party (PP)	47,234	13.14	+6.62	7	+5
United Left (IU/EB)	22,519	6.26	+5.21	2	+2
Basque Country Greens (EHB)	472	0.13	−0.09	0	±0
Public Hats (Herri-Hats)	446	0.12	New	0	±0
Carlist Party (EKA/PC)	185	0.05	New	0	±0
Democratic and Social Centre (CDS)	123	0.03	−0.27	0	±0
Blank ballots	7,728	2.15	+1.27		
Total	359,468			51	±0
Valid votes	359,468	99.13	−0.16		
Invalid votes	3,150	0.87	+0.16		
Votes cast / turnout	362,618	64.13	+3.06		
Abstentions	202,798	35.87	−3.06		
Registered voters	565,416				
Sources
Footnotes: ^{1} Socialist Party of the Basque Country–Basque Country Left results are compared to the combined totals of the Socialist Party of the Basque Country and Basque Country Left in the 1990 election.
