= Communist Party of the Basque Homelands =

Communist Party of the Basque Homelands Euskera: Euskal Herrialdeetako Alderdi Komunista Spanish: Partido Comunista de las Tierras Vascas
- Leader: Juan Carlos Ramos
- Founded: 27 July 2002
- Banned: 18 September 2008
- Headquarters: Vitoria-Gasteiz, Alava, Basque Country, Spain
- Ideology: Communism; Independentism; Marxism-Leninism; Ezker abertzalea Left-wing nationalism
- Colors: Red, White
- Basque Parliament: 7 / 75 (2005)

Website
- www.ehak.org

The Communist Party of the Basque Homelands (Basque: Euskal Herrialdeetako Alderdi Komunista, EHAK; Spanish: Partido Comunista de las Tierras Vascas, PCTV) was a Marxist-Leninist party Basque separatist party in the Basque Country, Spain. The party was outlawed by the Spanish Supreme Court in 2008 after it was judicially proven to be part of Batasuna and, therefore, ETA.

== History ==
EHAK was legally registered for the first time in 2002 but had no known activity until 2005, remaining inactive during these years. In this year, within weeks of the regional Basque election EHAK suddenly rose to national prominence when it publicly announced that it would assume the program of the banned abertzale lists of Aukera Guztiak and Batasuna. EHAK was then widely considered to be a proxy to circumvent the recent ruling which had outlawed Batasuna. Like Batasuna, their representatives refused to explicitly condemn the ETA attacks, being the only important political party not to do so in the Basque Country and Spain. Batasuna representatives asked their supporters to vote for EHAK, which obtained 150,188 votes (12.5%), entering the Basque Parliament with nine seats.

The People's Party requested that the Spanish government conducted investigations to ban EHAK too, though the initially State Legal Service (Abogacía General del Estado) and the Attorney General's Office (Fiscalía General del Estado) found no evidence to support legal actions against the party.

== Outlawing ==
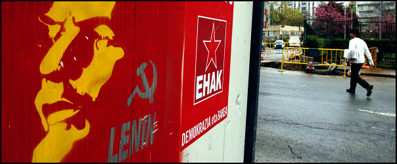
Election poster of EHAK-PCTV with a painted portrait of the communist leader Lenin

On 18 September 2008, the party was outlawed by the Spanish Supreme Court. According to the legal inquiry, EHAK was "instrumental in continuing the illegal action designed by ETA/Ekin/Batasuna", rapidly losing its autonomy to replace Batasuna's role in the institutional front of ETA's activities. Batasuna got, via EHAK, 837,000 euros corresponding to the public funding given to political parties with parliamentary representation; with no less than 34 Batasuna members (including some of their top officers) were hired by EHAK and paid with this public funding. In the end, according to the judicial inquiry, EHAK followed Batasuna's instructions to the point that there wasn't any difference.

On 4 August 2009, the judge Baltasar Garzón announced his intention to put a number of PCTV members on trial for ETA membership. Among them were two former Basque parliament deputies Karmele Berasategi and Nekane Erauskin; the party president Juan Carlos Ramos and the two party treasurers Jesús María Aguirre and Sonia Jacinto. Several other members, including Basque parliament deputy Maite Aranburu, were forced to testify in front of the Superior Court of Justice of the Basque Country.
