= 1991 Basque foral elections =

Elections in the Spanish region of the Basque Country

Foral elections were held in the Basque Country on 26 May 1991 to elect the 4th General Assemblies of Álava, Biscay and Guipúzcoa. All 153 seats in the three General Assemblies were up for election. They were held concurrently with regional elections in thirteen autonomous communities and local elections all across Spain.

== Overall ==
← Summary of the 26 May 1991 Basque foral election results →
Parties and alliances	Popular vote			Seats	
Parties and alliances	Votes	%	±pp	Total	+/−
Basque Nationalist Party (EAJ/PNV)	293,683	29.56	+7.78	47	+15
Socialist Party of the Basque Country (PSE–PSOE)	195,691	19.70	+0.80	32	±0
Popular Unity (HB)	172,844	17.40	−1.81	27	−5
Basque Solidarity (EA)	123,334	12.41	−5.20	19	−16
People's Party (PP)^{1}	79,877	8.04	+1.66	9	+3
Basque Country Left (EE)	68,139	6.86	−3.03	8	−4
Alavese Unity (UA)	22,342	2.25	New	11	+11
United Left (IU/EB)	17,864	1.80	+0.99	0	±0
Democratic and Social Centre (CDS)	5,225	0.53	−2.87	0	−4
Basque Country Greens (EHB)	3,325	0.33	New	0	±0
Green Union (UVE)	732	0.07	New	0	±0
Carlist Party (EKA/PC)	567	0.06	New	0	±0
Vitorian Youth (JV)	465	0.05	New	0	±0
Blank ballots	9,415	0.95	−0.07		
Total	993,503			153	±0
Valid votes	993,503	99.16	+0.09		
Invalid votes	8,407	0.84	−0.09		
Votes cast / turnout	1,001,910	59.03	−8.42		
Abstentions	695,489	40.97	+8.42		
Registered voters	1,697,399				
Sources
Footnotes: ^{1} People's Party results are compared to the combined totals of People's Alliance and People's Democratic Party–Liberal Party in the 1987 elections.

Popular vote
EAJ/PNV	29.56%
PSE–PSOE	19.70%
HB	17.40%
EA	12.41%
PP	8.04%
EE	6.86%
UA	2.25%
IU/EB	1.80%
Others	1.04%
Blank ballots	0.95%

== Deputation control ==
The following table lists party control in the foral deputations. Gains for a party are highlighted in that party's colour.

Province	Population	Previous control	New control
Álava	277,734	Socialist Party of the Basque Country (PSE–PSOE)	Basque Nationalist Party (EAJ/PNV)
Biscay	1,184,049	Basque Nationalist Party (EAJ/PNV)	Basque Nationalist Party (EAJ/PNV)
Guipúzcoa	697,918	Basque Solidarity (EA)	Basque Nationalist Party (EAJ/PNV)

== Historical territories ==
=== Álava ===
← Summary of the 26 May 1991 General Assembly of Álava election results →
Parties and alliances	Popular vote			Seats	
Parties and alliances	Votes	%	±pp	Total	+/−
Basque Nationalist Party (EAJ/PNV)	31,535	25.84	+8.44	14	+4
Alavese Unity (UA)	22,342	18.30	New	11	+11
Socialist Party of the Basque Country (PSE–PSOE)	22,080	18.09	−1.60	11	±0
Popular Unity (HB)	13,872	11.37	−2.63	7	−1
People's Party (PP)^{1}	10,725	8.79	−0.91	3	−1
Basque Solidarity (EA)	10,570	8.66	−12.30	3	−9
Basque Country Left (EE)	5,497	4.50	−3.50	2	−1
Democratic and Social Centre (CDS)	1,685	1.38	−5.71	0	−3
United Left (IU/EB)	1,329	1.09	New	0	±0
Green Union (UVE)	732	0.60	New	0	±0
Vitorian Youth (JV)	465	0.38	New	0	±0
Blank ballots	1,224	1.00	−0.16		
Total	122,056			51	±0
Valid votes	122,056	98.97	+0.14		
Invalid votes	1,270	1.03	−0.14		
Votes cast / turnout	123,326	57.71	−10.55		
Abstentions	90,361	42.29	+10.55		
Registered voters	213,687				
Sources
Footnotes: ^{1} People's Party results are compared to the combined totals of People's Alliance and People's Democratic Party in the 1987 elections.

=== Biscay ===
← Summary of the 26 May 1991 General Assembly of Biscay election results →
Parties and alliances	Popular vote			Seats	
Parties and alliances	Votes	%	±pp	Total	+/−
Basque Nationalist Party (EAJ/PNV)	193,413	35.82	+8.54	21	+5
Socialist Party of the Basque Country (PSE–PSOE)	113,380	21.00	+1.38	12	±0
Popular Unity (HB)	83,306	15.43	−2.20	8	−2
People's Party (PP)^{1}	47,552	8.81	+2.49	4	+3
Basque Solidarity (EA)	42,918	7.95	−4.93	4	−3
Basque Country Left (EE)	35,432	6.56	−2.80	2	−2
United Left (IU/EB)	13,061	2.42	+1.25	0	±0
Basque Country Greens (EHB)	2,587	0.48	New	0	±0
Democratic and Social Centre (CDS)	2,547	0.47	−3.22	0	−1
Carlist Party (EKA/PC)	567	0.10	New	0	±0
Blank ballots	5,262	0.97	−0.11		
Total	540,025			51	±0
Valid votes	540,025	99.13	+0.06		
Invalid votes	4,756	0.87	−0.06		
Votes cast / turnout	544,781	58.13	−8.72		
Abstentions	392,340	41.87	+8.72		
Registered voters	937,121				
Sources
Footnotes: ^{1} People's Party results are compared to the combined totals of People's Alliance and People's Democratic Party in the 1987 elections.

=== Guipúzcoa ===
← Summary of the 26 May 1991 General Assembly of Guipúzcoa election results →
Parties and alliances	Popular vote			Seats	
Parties and alliances	Votes	%	±pp	Total	+/−
Popular Unity (HB)	75,666	22.83	−0.98	12	−2
Basque Solidarity (EA)	69,846	21.07	−3.22	12	−4
Basque Nationalist Party (EAJ/PNV)	68,735	20.74	+6.54	12	+6
Socialist Party of the Basque Country (PSE–PSOE)	60,231	18.17	+0.77	9	±0
Basque Country Left (EE)	27,210	8.21	−3.28	4	−1
People's Party (PP)^{1}	21,600	6.52	+1.28	2	+1
United Left (IU/EB)	3,474	1.05	+0.53	0	±0
Democratic and Social Centre (CDS)	993	0.30	−1.23	0	±0
Basque Country Greens (EHB)	738	0.22	New	0	±0
Blank ballots	2,929	0.88	+0.01		
Total	331,422			51	±0
Valid votes	331,422	99.29	+0.14		
Invalid votes	2,381	0.71	−0.14		
Votes cast / turnout	333,803	61.07	−7.09		
Abstentions	212,788	38.93	+7.09		
Registered voters	546,591				
Sources
Footnotes: ^{1} People's Party results are compared to the combined totals of People's Alliance and People's Democratic Party–Liberal Party in the 1987 elections.
