= 1999 Basque foral elections =

Elections in the Spanish region of the Basque Country

Foral elections were held in the Basque Country on 13 June 1999 to elect the 6th General Assemblies of Álava, Biscay and Guipúzcoa. All 153 seats in the three General Assemblies were up for election. They were held concurrently with regional elections in thirteen autonomous communities and local elections all across Spain, as well as the 1999 European Parliament election.

== Overall ==
← Summary of the 13 June 1999 Basque foral election results →
Parties and alliances	Popular vote			Seats	
Parties and alliances	Votes	%	±pp	Total	+/−
Basque Nationalist Party–Basque Solidarity (PNV–EA)^{1}	401,965	34.70	−4.54	56	−6
Basque Citizens (EH)^{2}	228,528	19.73	+5.30	29	+9
People's Party (PP)	220,859	19.06	+3.60	34	+9
Socialist Party of the Basque Country–Basque Country Left (PSE–EE (PSOE))	212,167	18.31	+1.59	29	+3
United Left (IU/EB)	53,525	4.62	−3.51	3	−6
Alavese Unity (UA)	9,448	0.82	−1.29	2	−7
Basque Citizen Initiative (ICV/EHE)	8,243	0.71	−1.12	0	−2
We, the Women of the Plaza (Plazandreok)	2,177	0.19	New	0	±0
The Greens (B/LV)	2,034	0.18	New	0	±0
Humanist Party (PH)	1,146	0.10	New	0	±0
Basque Country Greens (EHB)	360	0.03	−0.01	0	±0
Blank ballots	18,081	1.56	−0.27		
Total	1,158,533			153	±0
Valid votes	1,158,533	99.07	±0.00		
Invalid votes	10,917	0.93	±0.00		
Votes cast / turnout	1,169,450	64.83	+0.91		
Abstentions	634,355	35.17	−0.91		
Registered voters	1,803,805				
Sources
Footnotes: ^{1} Basque Nationalist Party–Basque Solidarity results are compared to the combined totals of Basque Nationalist Party and Basque Solidarity in the 1995 elections.; ^{2} Basque Citizens results are compared to Popular Unity totals in the 1995 elections.

Popular vote
PNV–EA	34.70%
EH	19.73%
PP	19.06%
PSE–EE (PSOE)	18.31%
IU/EB	4.62%
Others	2.02%
Blank ballots	1.56%

== Deputation control ==
The following table lists party control in the foral deputations. Gains for a party are highlighted in that party's colour.

Province	Population	Previous control	New control
Álava	284,595	Basque Nationalist Party (EAJ/PNV)	People's Party (PP)
Biscay	1,137,594	Basque Nationalist Party (EAJ/PNV)	Basque Nationalist Party (EAJ/PNV)
Guipúzcoa	676,019	Basque Nationalist Party (EAJ/PNV)	Basque Nationalist Party (EAJ/PNV)

== Historical territories ==
=== Álava ===
← Summary of the 13 June 1999 General Assembly of Álava election results →
Parties and alliances	Popular vote			Seats	
Parties and alliances	Votes	%	±pp	Total	+/−
People's Party (PP)	44,607	28.75	+11.62	16	+7
Basque Nationalist Party–Basque Solidarity (PNV–EA)^{1}	44,166	28.46	−5.43	16	−3
Socialist Party of the Basque Country–Basque Country Left (PSE–EE (PSOE))	26,122	16.83	+2.42	9	+2
Basque Citizens (EH)^{2}	21,154	13.63	+4.53	6	+2
Alavese Unity (UA)	9,448	6.09	−9.92	2	−7
United Left (IU/EB)	7,181	4.63	−3.16	2	−1
Blank ballots	2,500	1.61	−0.07		
Total	155,178			51	±0
Valid votes	155,178	99.03	±0.00		
Invalid votes	1,522	0.97	±0.00		
Votes cast / turnout	156,700	64.38	+0.05		
Abstentions	86,688	35.62	−0.05		
Registered voters	243,388				
Sources
Footnotes: ^{1} Basque Nationalist Party–Basque Solidarity results are compared to the combined totals of Basque Nationalist Party and Basque Solidarity in the 1995 election.; ^{2} Basque Citizens results are compared to Popular Unity totals in the 1995 election.

=== Biscay ===
← Summary of the 13 June 1999 General Assembly of Biscay election results →
Parties and alliances	Popular vote			Seats	
Parties and alliances	Votes	%	±pp	Total	+/−
Basque Nationalist Party–Basque Solidarity (PNV–EA)^{1}	227,768	36.56	−3.63	21	±0
People's Party (PP)	121,223	19.46	+3.03	10	+1
Socialist Party of the Basque Country–Basque Country Left (PSE–EE (PSOE))	117,872	18.92	+2.01	10	±0
Basque Citizens (EH)^{2}	102,341	16.43	+4.56	9	+4
United Left (IU/EB)	32,705	5.25	−4.07	1	−3
Basque Citizen Initiative (ICV/EHE)	8,243	1.32	−2.04	0	−2
Humanist Party (PH)	1,146	0.18	New	0	±0
The Greens (B/LV)	1,119	0.18	New	0	±0
We, the Women of the Plaza (Plazandreok)	923	0.15	New	0	±0
Blank ballots	9,686	1.55	−0.13		
Total	623,026			51	±0
Valid votes	623,026	99.14	+0.09		
Invalid votes	5,398	0.86	−0.09		
Votes cast / turnout	628,424	64.32	+0.63		
Abstentions	348,666	35.68	−0.63		
Registered voters	977,090				
Sources
Footnotes: ^{1} Basque Nationalist Party–Basque Solidarity results are compared to the combined totals of Basque Nationalist Party and Basque Solidarity in the 1995 election.; ^{2} Basque Citizens results are compared to Popular Unity totals in the 1995 election.

=== Guipúzcoa ===
← Summary of the 13 June 1999 General Assembly of Guipúzcoa election results →
Parties and alliances	Popular vote			Seats	
Parties and alliances	Votes	%	±pp	Total	+/−
Basque Nationalist Party–Basque Solidarity (PNV–EA)^{1}	130,031	34.19	−5.65	19	−3
Basque Citizens (EH)^{2}	105,033	27.62	+6.68	14	+3
Socialist Party of the Basque Country–Basque Country Left (PSE–EE (PSOE))	68,173	17.92	+0.59	10	+1
People's Party (PP)	55,029	14.47	+1.33	8	+1
United Left (IU/EB)	13,639	3.59	−2.67	0	−2
We, the Women of the Plaza (Plazandreok)	1,254	0.33	New	0	±0
The Greens (B/LV)	915	0.24	New	0	±0
Basque Country Greens (EHB)	360	0.09	−0.04	0	±0
Blank ballots	5,895	1.55	−0.60		
Total	380,329			51	±0
Valid votes	380,329	98.96	−0.17		
Invalid votes	3,997	1.04	+0.17		
Votes cast / turnout	384,326	65.89	+1.76		
Abstentions	199,001	34.11	−1.76		
Registered voters	583,327				
Sources
Footnotes: ^{1} Basque Nationalist Party–Basque Solidarity results are compared to the combined totals of Basque Nationalist Party and Basque Solidarity in the 1995 election.; ^{2} Basque Citizens results are compared to Popular Unity totals in the 1995 election.
