= Maite Aranburu =

Spanish Basque politician

Member of the Basque Parliament for Biscay
- In office 7 June 2005 – 6 January 2009

Personal details
- Party: EHAK

Maite Aranburu Olabarrieta is a Spanish Basque politician who served in the Basque Parliament from 2005 until 2009, representing the Biscay constituency as a member of the Communist Party of the Basque Homelands.

== Biography ==
Maite Aranburu Olabarrieta, a web manager and the leader of the Communist Party of the Basque Homelands (EHAK), was elected to the Basque Parliament following the 2005 Basque regional election. Elected to represent the Biscay constituency, she campaigned on a pro-independence platform, vowed to give a voice to the recently banned political party Batasuna, and refused to condemn the terrorist activities of ETA. Eight other EHAK candidates were also elected, a "surprise" performance for the recently formed party.

In parliament, Aranburu sat as a member of the Left Nationalist Group and was a member of the Committee on Women and Youth. EHAK was officially banned in 2008, forcing Aranburu and the other deputies to sit as members of a different party. Aranburu left parliament in 2009. Later that year, Aranburu was forced to testify before a judge of the Superior Court of Justice of the Basque Country who was investigating the relationship between EHAK "with the alleged crimes of collaboration with a terrorist organization, illegal association, fraud of subsidies and embezzlement of public funds ... to contribute to the activity and allegedly terrorist purposes of Batasuna-ETA".
