= 2003 Basque foral elections =

Elections in the Spanish region of the Basque Country

Foral elections were held in the Basque Country on 25 May 2003 to elect the 7th General Assemblies of Álava, Biscay and Guipúzcoa. All 153 seats in the three General Assemblies were up for election. They were held concurrently with regional elections in thirteen autonomous communities and local elections all across Spain.

== Overall ==
← Summary of the 25 May 2003 Basque foral election results →
Parties and alliances	Popular vote			Seats	
Parties and alliances	Votes	%	±pp	Total	+/−
Basque Nationalist Party–Basque Solidarity (PNV–EA)	512,645	45.34	+10.64	73	+17
Socialist Party of the Basque Country–Basque Country Left (PSE–EE (PSOE))	243,855	21.57	+3.26	35	+6
People's Party (PP)	221,580	19.60	+0.54	34	±0
United Left (EB/IU)	91,266	8.07	+3.45	9	+6
Aralar (Aralar)	36,091	3.19	New	1	+1
Alavese Unity (UA)	6,373	0.56	−0.26	1	−1
We, the Women of the Plaza (Plazandreok)	973	0.09	−0.10	0	±0
Humanist Party (PH)	880	0.08	−0.02	0	±0
Carlist Party (EKA/PC)	566	0.05	New	0	±0
Basque Citizens (EH)	n/a	n/a	−19.73	0	−29
Blank ballots	16,551	1.46	−0.10		
Total	1,130,780			153	±0
Valid votes	1,130,780	89.58	−9.49		
Invalid votes	131,593	10.42	+9.49		
Votes cast / turnout	1,262,373	69.97	+5.14		
Abstentions	541,873	30.03	−5.14		
Registered voters	1,804,246				

Popular vote
PNV–EA	45.34%
PSE–EE (PSOE)	21.57%
PP	19.60%
EB/IU	8.07%
Aralar	3.19%
Others	0.78%
Blank ballots	1.46%

== Deputation control ==
The following table lists party control in the foral deputations. Gains for a party are highlighted in that party's colour.

Province	Population	Previous control	New control
Álava	291,860	People's Party (PP)	People's Party (PP)
Biscay	1,133,444	Basque Nationalist Party (EAJ/PNV)	Basque Nationalist Party (EAJ/PNV)
Guipúzcoa	682,977	Basque Nationalist Party (EAJ/PNV)	Basque Nationalist Party (EAJ/PNV)

== Historical territories ==
=== Álava ===
← Summary of the 25 May 2003 General Assembly of Álava election results →
Parties and alliances	Popular vote			Seats	
Parties and alliances	Votes	%	±pp	Total	+/−
Basque Nationalist Party–Basque Solidarity (PNV–EA)	59,068	35.53	+7.07	19	+3
People's Party (PP)	47,346	28.48	−0.27	16	±0
Socialist Party of the Basque Country–Basque Country Left (PSE–EE (PSOE))	35,733	21.50	+4.67	12	+3
United Left (EB/IU)	11,886	7.15	+2.52	3	+1
Alavese Unity (UA)	6,373	3.83	−2.26	1	−1
Aralar (Aralar)	3,588	2.16	New	0	±0
Basque Citizens (EH)	n/a	n/a	−13.63	0	−6
Blank ballots	2,238	1.35	−0.26		
Total	166,232			51	±0
Valid votes	166,232	93.56	−5.47		
Invalid votes	11,451	6.44	+5.47		
Votes cast / turnout	177,683	72.02	+7.64		
Abstentions	69,017	27.98	−7.64		
Registered voters	246,700				

=== Biscay ===
← Summary of the 25 May 2003 General Assembly of Biscay election results →
Parties and alliances	Popular vote			Seats	
Parties and alliances	Votes	%	±pp	Total	+/−
Basque Nationalist Party–Basque Solidarity (PNV–EA)	297,279	47.12	+10.56	27	+6
Socialist Party of the Basque Country–Basque Country Left (PSE–EE (PSOE))	129,381	20.51	+1.59	11	+1
People's Party (PP)	123,814	19.62	+0.16	10	±0
United Left (EB/IU)	56,093	8.89	+3.64	3	+2
Aralar (Aralar)	13,883	2.20	New	0	±0
Humanist Party (PH)	880	0.14	−0.04	0	±0
Carlist Party (EKA/PC)	363	0.06	New	0	±0
Basque Citizens (EH)	n/a	n/a	−16.43	0	−9
Blank ballots	9,261	1.47	−0.08		
Total	630,954			51	±0
Valid votes	630,954	91.82	−7.32		
Invalid votes	56,204	8.18	+7.32		
Votes cast / turnout	687,158	70.41	+6.09		
Abstentions	288,749	29.59	−6.09		
Registered voters	975,907				

=== Guipúzcoa ===
← Summary of the 25 May 2003 General Assembly of Guipúzcoa election results →
Parties and alliances	Popular vote			Seats	
Parties and alliances	Votes	%	±pp	Total	+/−
Basque Nationalist Party–Basque Solidarity (PNV–EA)	156,298	46.85	+12.66	27	+8
Socialist Party of the Basque Country–Basque Country Left (PSE–EE (PSOE))	78,741	23.60	+5.68	12	+2
People's Party (PP)	50,420	15.11	+0.64	8	±0
United Left (EB/IU)	23,287	6.98	+3.39	3	+3
Aralar (Aralar)	18,620	5.58	New	1	+1
We, the Women of the Plaza (Plazandreok)	973	0.29	−0.04	0	±0
Carlist Party (EKA/PC)	203	0.06	New	0	±0
Basque Citizens (EH)	n/a	n/a	−27.62	0	−14
Blank ballots	5,052	1.51	−0.04		
Total	333,594			51	±0
Valid votes	333,594	83.92	−15.04		
Invalid votes	63,938	16.08	+15.04		
Votes cast / turnout	397,532	68.35	+2.46		
Abstentions	184,107	31.65	−2.46		
Registered voters	581,639				
