= Aintzane Ezenarro =

Spanish politician

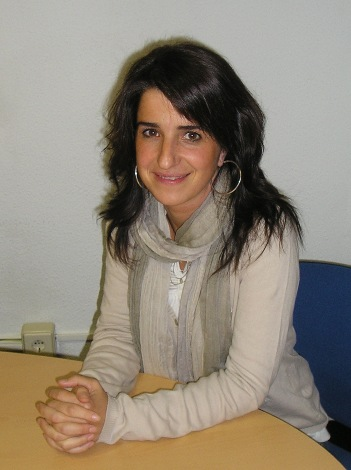
Aintzane Ezenarro in 2009

Aintzane Ezenarro Egurbide (Getaria, Basque Country, Spain, 1971) is a former Spanish politician and peace activist. She was a member of the Aralar party, and its spokeswoman in the Basque Parliament between the 2005 Basque parliamentary election and her expulsion from the party in 2012. She also was a councillor of her hometown, Getaria.

Aintzane Ezenarro studied sociology and journalism and she took part in Elkarri, the social movement for the dialogue and peace in the Basque Country.

In the 2009 Basque regional election Aralar increased both its votes and seats, passing from 28,000 votes to 62,000 and from one only seat (occupied by Ezenarro herself) to four seats. With those results, Ezenarro became leader of the Aralar parliamentary group.

After she supported the creation of a new Forum for Peace and Coexistence, which excluded the Basque nationalist Batasuna party, she was ousted from her party in 2012, and ended her political career after the 2012 Basque regional election. She joined the forum, she helped to create. In 2015 she joined the newly formed Gogora Institute for Memory, Coexistence and Human Rights, and became its director. She held this role until 2024, when she was replaced by Alberto Alonso.
