= Reforma o ruptura =

"Reform or Rapture" Spanish political philosophy after Franco's death

Reforma o ruptura (transl. "reform or rupture"; meaning "reform or breaking away [from Francoism]") is the expression used to synthesize the political dilemma faced by Spanish society in the aftermath of the death of Spanish leader Francisco Franco.

After the death of Franco, Spanish society as a whole was not politically active, especially compared to other Western European countries, due to Francoist Spain's sheer length (36 years); citizen political affiliation was very low. There were some demonstrations, especially demanding the amnesty of political prisoners; however, the protests never were a threat to the political stability of Spain. The political and social unrest was concentrated in the Basque Country and in Navarre (due to the repression of Basque nationalism) and, to a lesser extent, in Catalonia.

However, the uncertainty regarding the continuity of the Francoist State boosted political activism, leading to the configuration of a debate on the political future of Spain in which there were essentially two options, with the possibility of a "Francoism without Franco" (Spanish: Franquismo sin Franco) being rejected early on:

- Rupture (Spanish: Ruptura): essentially, this would mean fully breaking away from the Francoist state and everything that it represented, with immediate measures aimed at democratization, such as: a referendum on the form of the state (monarchy or republic), a full amnesty for those imprisoned for political motives, the recognition of Basque, Catalan and Galician national identities, or the total secularization of the state, which would mean abolishing the Concordat of 1953.
- Reform (Spanish: Reforma): This was the option that would eventually triumph, since it was the path supported by the Spanish institutions, particularly figureheads such as King Juan Carlos and Adolfo Suárez. It was based on a "pact" or "agreement" with the Francoist statesmen, in order to gradually transition from an autocratic government towards a parliamentary monarchy while maintaining social peace and public order. It would eventually gain the support of the PSOE and the Communist Party.

== See also ==
- Adolfo Suárez
- Francisco Franco
- Francoist Spain
- Juan Carlos I of Spain
- Santiago Carrillo
- Spanish general election, 1977
- Spanish transition to democracy
