= María San Gil =

Spanish politician

María San Gil Noain
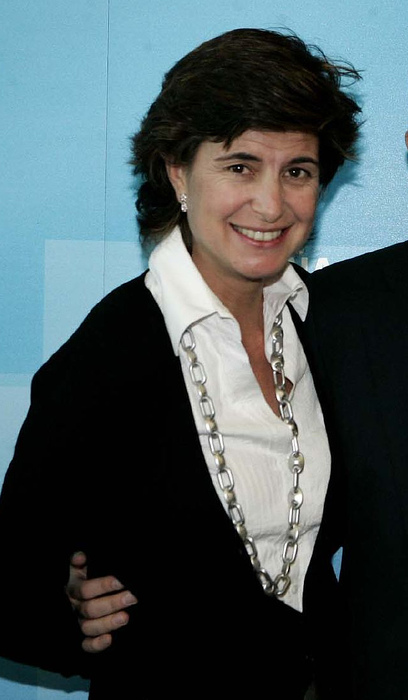

Personal details
- Born: 15 January 1965 (age 61) San Sebastián, Gipuzkoa, Basque, Spain
- Party: People's Party
- Children: 2
- Education: Pontifical University of Salamanca

María San Gil Noain (born 15 January 1965, in San Sebastián) is a Spanish Basque politician.

== Career ==
Born in San Sebastián, San Gil graduated with a degree in Trilingual Biblical Philology from the Universidad Pontificia de Salamanca. In 1991 she began working for the San Sebastián city council, representing the conservative Partido Popular. On January 23, 1995, she witnessed the assassination of her colleague Gregorio Ordóñez by the Basque separatist group ETA, and thereafter decided that she would spend her political career fighting terrorism.

Rising steadily in prominence, in 2003 she became the leader of the Partido Popular's regional representation in the Basque Country. In the regional elections of 2005 she was a candidate for Basque regional president or lehendakari, but lost out to the nationalist candidate Juan Jose Ibarretxe of the EAJ-PNV.

On April 18, 2007, she announced that she had been diagnosed with breast cancer and had already been operated on once. On May 21, 2008, after a meeting with Mariano Rajoy she informed him of her intention to resign from the leadership position in the regional representation of the Partido Popular.

== Personal life ==
San Gil is married and has two children.
