= Aralar (Basque political party) =

- Leader: Patxi Zabaleta
- Founded: 30 June 2001
- Dissolved: 2 December 2017
- Merged into: EH Bildu
- Headquarters: Rincón de la Aduana 16-18, 31001, Pamplona, Navarre
- Youth wing: Iratzarri
- Ideology: Socialism; Basque independence Left-wing nationalism Pacifism; Ecologism
- Political position: Left-wing
- National affiliation: Nafarroa Bai (2004–2011); Amaiur (2011–2015); EH Bildu (since 2011)
- European affiliation: European Free Alliance
- Colours: Red, White

Website
- www.aralar.eus

Aralar was a Basque socialist and separatist political party in Spain. It was opposed to the violent struggle of ETA.

== History ==
Aralar was born in the 1990s from a critical tendency within Herri Batasuna (HB) and Euskal Herritarrok (EH), led by Patxi Zabaleta. The tendency had its main base in Navarre. The breaking of ETA's truce in 2000 provoked Herri Batasuna's reformation into Batasuna, to have presence in all Euskal Herria. Following disagreements over the internal organization of Batasuna, Aralar broke away to form a separate political party. In 2004 the youth wing of Aralar, Iratzarri, was founded.

In the May 2003 election for the Navarre Assembly, Aralar obtained 24,068 votes (8.02% of the valid votes) and four seats and in the same community obtained 4.76% of the valid votes in the municipal elections and 18 local councillors. In the Basque Autonomous Community it obtained 30 councillors and 1.51% of the valid votes. Aralar contested the Spanish general election, 2004 in the Basque Autonomous Community in coalition with Zutik but failed to win any seats, polling 3.09% of the valid votes. The party contested in Navarre as part of the coalition Nafarroa Bai (NaBai), together with Eusko Alkartasuna (EA), Batzarre, the Basque Nationalist Party (PNV) and independents, obtaining a seat for the independent Uxue Barkos and 18.04% of the whole of valid votes, which was the highest percentage and number of votes for a Basque nationalist list in Spanish General Elections in Navarre. In the 2005 Basque elections, Aralar entered the Basque Parliament with one seat and 2.33% of the votes. This seat was held by Aintzane Ezenarro. In 2007, it won four local Assembly seats and 130 local council seats in the Basque Autonomous Community, in coalition with Ezker Batua, and five local Assembly seats and 30 council seats in Navarre, within Navarre Yes. Aralar contested the 2008 General Elections in the Basque Autonomous Community polling 2.67% of the total votes, 0.42% less than Aralar-Zutik coalition's result four years ago. In Navarre the party kept the Nafarroa Bai coalition, which obtained the 18.53% (+0.55) and one seat, still held by Barkos. In the 2009 Basque elections, Aralar increased its presence in the Basque Parliament with four seats and 6.04% of votes. The head of the parliamentary group is still Aintzane Ezenarro.

On 2 December 2017, Aralar leaders unanimously dissolved the party as part of merging into the EH Bildu party, with which it was in coalition. This was done as the party's goal of defense and recognition of all human rights was deemed accomplished, and Alar found EH Bildu's internal democracy improved and allowing for multiple ideological currents.

== See also ==
- EH Bildu
