= Next Basque regional election =

Election in the Spanish region of the Basque Country

- No later than 21 May 2028

All 75 seats in the Basque Parliament 38 seats needed for a majority
- Opinion polls
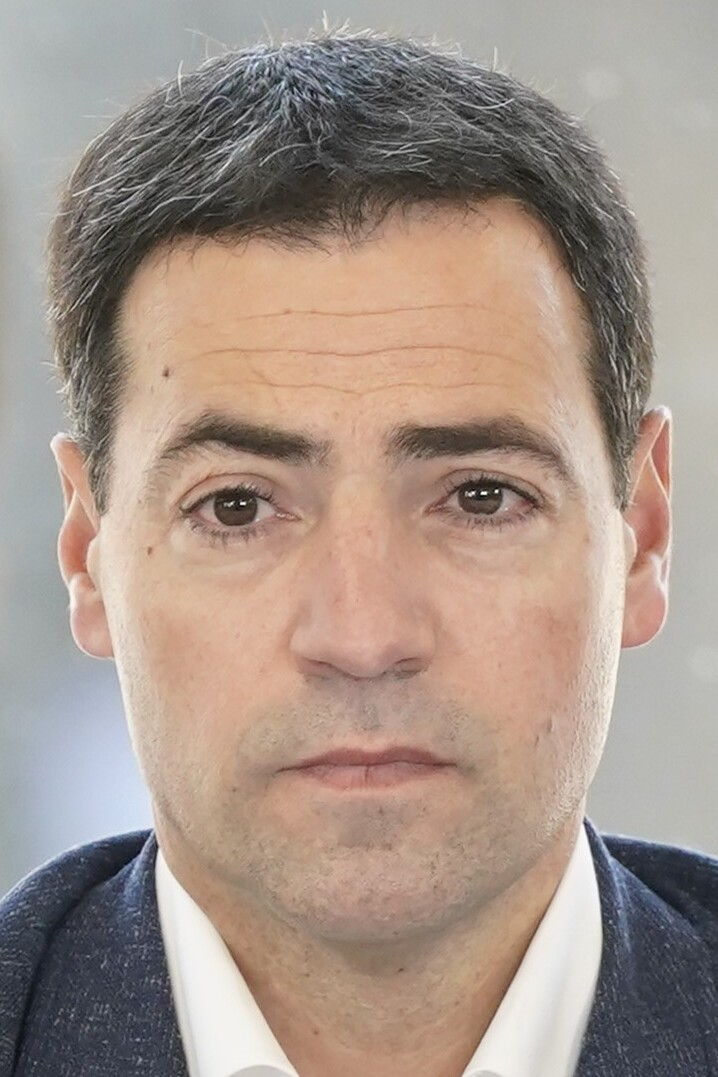

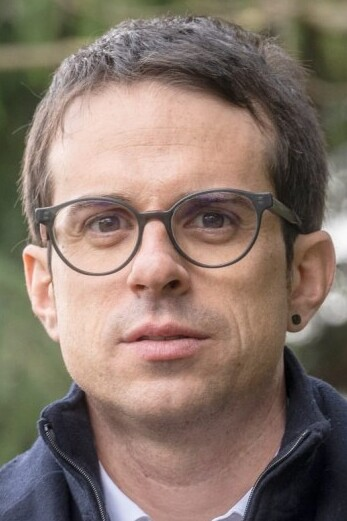

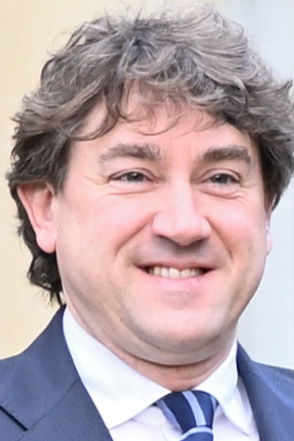

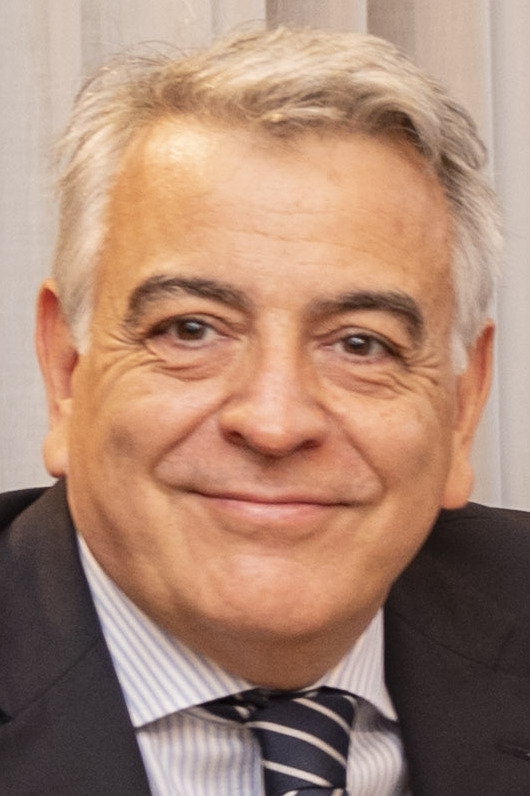

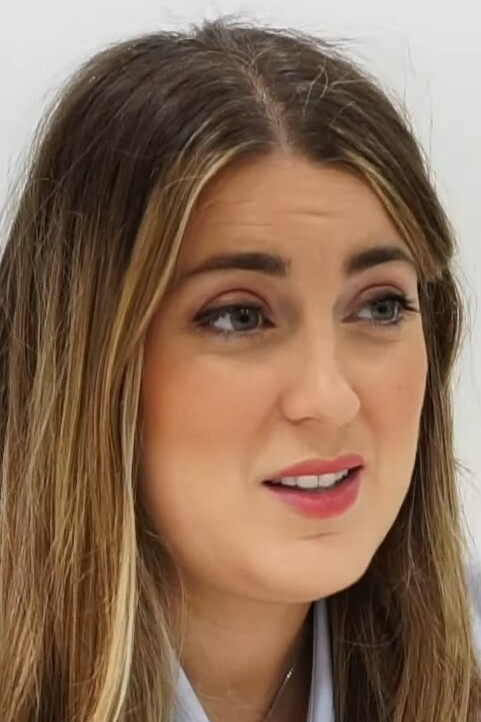

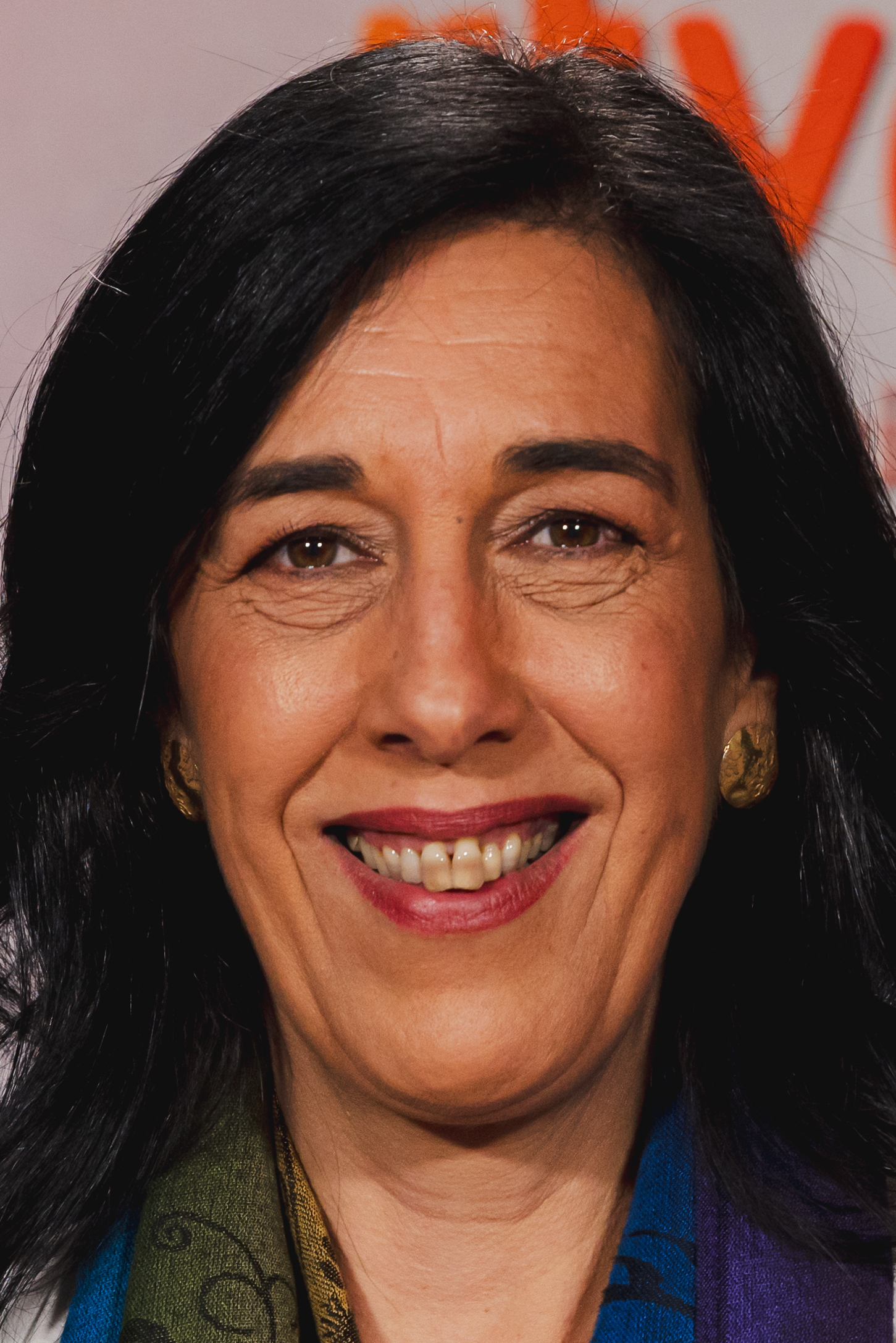
Leader	Imanol Pradales	Pello Otxandiano	Eneko Andueza
Party	EAJ/PNV	EH Bildu	PSE–EE (PSOE)
Leader since	27 January 2024	11 December 2023	30 October 2021
Leader's seat	Biscay	Álava	Biscay
Last election	27 seats, 34.8%	27 seats, 32.1%	12 seats, 14.1%
Current seats	27	27	12
Seats needed	▲11	▲11	▲26
Leader	Javier de Andrés	Alba García	Amaia Martínez
Party	PP	Sumar	Vox
Leader since	4 November 2023	9 January 2024	3 August 2020
Leader's seat	Álava	—	Álava
Last election	7 seats, 9.2%	1 seat, 3.3%	1 seat, 2.0%
Current seats	7	1	1
Seats needed	▲31	▲37	▲37
Incumbent Lehendakari
Imanol Pradales
EAJ/PNV

A regional election will be held in the Basque Country no later than 21 May 2028 to elect the 14th Parliament of the autonomous community. All 75 seats in the Parliament will be up for election.

== Overview ==
Under the 1979 Statute of Autonomy, the Basque Parliament is the unicameral legislature of the Basque Autonomous Community, having legislative power in devolved matters, as well as the ability to grant or withdraw confidence from a lehendakari. The electoral and procedural rules are supplemented by national law provisions.

=== Date ===
The term of the Basque Parliament expires four years after the date of its previous election, unless it is dissolved earlier. The election decree shall be issued no later than 25 days before the scheduled expiration date of parliament and published on the following day in the Official Gazette of the Basque Country (BOPV), with election day taking place 54 days after the decree's publication. The previous election was held on 21 April 2024, which means that the chamber's term will expire on 21 April 2028. The election decree shall be published in the BOPV no later than 28 March 2028, setting the latest possible date for election day on 21 May 2028.

The lehendakari has the prerogative to dissolve the Basque Parliament at any given time and call a snap election, provided that no motion of no confidence is in process. In the event of an investiture process failing to elect a lehendakari within a 60-day period from the Parliament's reconvening, the chamber is to be automatically dissolved and a fresh election called.

=== Electoral system ===
Voting for the Parliament is based on universal suffrage, comprising all Spanish nationals over 18 years of age, registered in the Basque Country and with full political rights, provided that they have not been deprived of the right to vote by a final sentence.

The Basque Parliament has 75 seats. All are elected in three multi-member constituencies—corresponding to the provinces of Álava, Biscay and Gipuzkoa, each of which is assigned a fixed number of 25 seats to provide for an equal parliamentary representation of the three provinces—using the D'Hondt method and closed-list proportional voting, with a three percent-threshold of valid votes (including blank ballots) in each constituency. The use of this electoral method may result in a higher effective threshold depending on district magnitude and vote distribution.

The law does not provide for by-elections to fill vacant seats; instead, any vacancies arising after the proclamation of candidates and during the legislative term will be filled by the next candidates on the party lists or, when required, by designated substitutes.

=== Current parliament ===
The table below shows the composition of the parliamentary groups in the chamber at the present time.

Current parliamentary composition
Groups	Parties	Legislators	
Groups	Parties	Seats	Total
Basque Nationalists Parliamentary Group	EAJ/PNV	27	27
EH Bildu Parliamentary Group	EH Bildu	27	27
Basque Socialists Parliamentary Group	PSE–EE (PSOE)	12	12
Basque People's Parliamentary Group	PP	7	7
Mixed Group	EzAn–IU	1	2
Mixed Group	Vox	1	2

== Parties and candidates ==
The electoral law allows for parties and federations registered in the interior ministry, alliances and groupings of electors to present lists of candidates. Parties and federations intending to form an alliance are required to inform the relevant electoral commission within 10 days of the election call, whereas groupings of electors need to secure the signature of at least one percent of the electorate in the constituencies for which they seek election, disallowing electors from signing for more than one list. Amendments in 2024 required a balanced composition of men and women in the electoral lists through the use of a zipper system.

Below is a list of the main parties and alliances which will likely contest the election:

Candidacy	Parties and alliances	Leading candidate	Ideology	Previous result		Gov.	Ref.
Candidacy	Parties and alliances	Leading candidate	Ideology	Vote %	Seats	Gov.	Ref.
EAJ/PNV	List: Basque Nationalist Party (EAJ/PNV)	Imanol Pradales	Basque nationalism Christian democracy Social democracy	34.8%	27	Yes	
EH Bildu	List: Basque Country Gather (EH Bildu) – Create (Sortu) – Basque Solidarity (EA) – Alternative (Alternatiba)	Pello Otxandiano	Basque independence Abertzale left Socialism	32.1%	27	No	
PSE–EE (PSOE)	List: Socialist Party of the Basque Country–Basque Country Left (PSE–EE (PSOE))	Eneko Andueza	Social democracy	14.1%	12	Yes	
PP	List: People's Party (PP)	Javier de Andrés	Conservatism; Christian democracy	9.2%	7	No	
Sumar	List: Unite Movement (MS); Plural Left–United Left (EzAn–IU) – Communist Party of the Basque Country (PCE/EPK) – The Dawn Marxist Organization (La Aurora (OM)) – Republican Left (IR); Greens Equo (VQ)	Alba García	Progressivism; Left-wing populism Green politics	3.3%	1	No	
Vox	List: Vox (Vox)	Amaia Martínez	Right-wing populism Ultranationalism; National conservatism	2.0%	1	No	

== Opinion polls ==
The tables below list opinion polling results in reverse chronological order, showing the most recent first and using the dates when the survey fieldwork was done, as opposed to the date of publication. Where the fieldwork dates are unknown, the date of publication is given instead. The highest percentage figure in each polling survey is displayed with its background shaded in the leading party's colour. If a tie ensues, this is applied to the figures with the highest percentages. The "Lead" column on the right shows the percentage-point difference between the parties with the highest percentages in a poll.

=== Voting intention estimates ===
The table below lists weighted voting intention estimates. Refusals are generally excluded from the party vote percentages, while question wording and the treatment of "don't know" responses and those not intending to vote may vary between polling organisations. When available, seat projections determined by the polling organisations are displayed below (or in place of) the percentages in a smaller font; 38 seats are required for an absolute majority in the Basque Parliament.

Polling firm/Commissioner	Fieldwork date	Sample size	Turnout	PNV	EH Bildu	PSE–EE (PSOE)	PP	Sumar	Podemos	Vox	Lead
Sigma Dos/El Mundo	7–16 Apr 2026	1,411	?	34.7; 27/28	32.1; 25/27	14.0; 12/13	8.5; 6/7	3.4; 1/2	–	2.7; 1/2	2.6
Ikerfel/GPS	23–26 Mar 2026	3,030	59.8	35.3; 28	32.2; 27	14.3; 12	8.7; 7	2.3; 0	2.0; 0	2.9; 1	3.1
Aztiker/EH Bildu	24 Dec 2025	2,990	?	? 27	? 28	? 11	? 7	–	–	? 2	?
Ikerfel/GPS	11–14 Nov 2025	3,030	60.2	36.2; 29	31.7; 27	13.6; 11	8.4; 6	3.0; 1	1.9; 0	3.2; 1	4.5
Ikerfel/GPS	17–20 Jun 2025	3,030	59.3	36.1; 28	31.3; 28	13.9; 11	8.9; 7	2.5; 0	2.0; 0	3.1; 1	4.8
NC Report/La Razón	16–31 May 2025	350	?	? 26	? 28	? 11	? 8	–	? 1	? 1	?
Sigma Dos/El Mundo	Feb 2025	?	?	34.5	32.5	14.1	9.0	–	–	–	2.0
Ikerfel/GPS	28–31 Jan 2025	3,030	58.2	35.3; 28	32.0; 27	14.0; 11	9.2; 8	2.5; 0	2.5; 0	2.0; 1	3.3
EM-Analytics/Electomanía	29 Dec–28 Jan 2025	1,450	?	34.5; 28	31.9; 28	12.9; 10	9.1; 7	2.9; 0	3.5; 2	1.6; 0	2.6
Ikerfel/GPS	5–8 Nov 2024	3,030	60.2	35.2; 28	32.0; 27	14.6; 13	9.1; 7	2.6; 0	2.2; 0	2.0; 0	3.2
EM-Analytics/Electomanía	29 Sep–27 Oct 2024	1,450	?	34.0; 27	31.8; 27	12.4; 10	9.5; 7	3.4; 1	4.5; 3	1.7; 0	2.2
2024 EP election	9 Jun 2024	—N/a	48.8	22.4 (17)	26.3 (22)	26.0 (23)	11.6 (9)	3.3 (2)	3.2 (1)	2.7 (1)	0.3
2024 regional election	21 Apr 2024	—N/a	60.0	34.8; 27	32.1; 27	14.1; 12	9.2; 7	3.3; 1	2.2; 0	2.0; 1	2.7

=== Voting preferences ===
The table below lists raw, unweighted voting preferences.

Polling firm/Commissioner	Fieldwork date	Sample size	PNV	EH Bildu	PSE–EE (PSOE)	PP	Sumar	Podemos	Vox	Question	X mark	Lead
Ikerfel/GPS	23–26 Mar 2026	3,030	20.9	18.3	6.7	2.2	0.6	1.3	1.7	32.8	11.8	2.6
Ikerfel/GPS	11–14 Nov 2025	3,030	24.0	18.9	6.5	2.2	1.3	1.5	2.0	30.4	10.7	5.1
Ikerfel/GPS	17–20 Jun 2025	3,030	23.2	18.2	7.1	2.5	0.8	1.3	1.9	29.6	12.4	5.0
CIS	7–31 Mar 2025	1,023	27.2	18.8	12.8	3.9	1.4	1.8	2.7	20.3	7.4	8.4
Ikerfel/GPS	28–31 Jan 2025	3,030	22.1	19.6	6.9	2.3	0.9	1.4	0.7	28.1	14.1	2.5
Ikerfel/GPS	5–8 Nov 2024	3,030	22.9	20.1	7.7	1.8	1.0	1.6	0.8	29.4	11.6	2.8
2024 EP election (Note: Does not include non-resident citizens.)	9 Jun 2024	—N/a	13.1	13.3	11.4	5.8	1.7	1.6	1.4	—N/a	49.1	0.2
2024 regional election	21 Apr 2024	—N/a	21.6	20.0	8.7	5.7	2.0	1.4	1.2	—N/a	37.5	1.6

=== Preferred Lehendakari ===
The table below lists opinion polling on leader preferences to become lehendakari.

Polling firm/Commissioner	Fieldwork date	Sample size							Other/ None/ Not care	Question	Lead
Polling firm/Commissioner	Fieldwork date	Sample size	Pradales PNV	Otxan. EH Bildu	Andueza PSE–EE	De Andrés PP	Hernández Sumar	Martínez Vox	Other/ None/ Not care	Question	Lead
Ikerfel/GPS	20–26 May 2026	3,485	25.0	11.0	5.0	3.0	1.0	5.0	15.0	35.0	14.0
CIS (Note: Responses denoting a party's generic candidate are aggregated to that party's main candidate/leader at the time of the poll.)	7–31 Mar 2025	1,023	25.0	11.4	7.3	2.1	–	–	7.3	47.0	13.6

== Bibliography ==
- Ley Orgánica 3/1979, de 18 de diciembre, de Estatuto de Autonomía para el País Vasco (Organic Law 3/1979). Official State Gazette (in Spanish). 18 December 1979 [version as of 22 December 1979]. BOE-A-1979-30177.
- Ley 7/1981, de 30 de junio, sobre Ley de Gobierno (Law 7/1981). Official State Gazette (in Spanish). 30 June 1981 [version as of 26 December 2022]. BOE-A-2012-5927.
- Ley Orgánica 5/1985, de 19 de junio, del Régimen Electoral General (Organic Law 5/1985). Official State Gazette (in Spanish). 19 June 1985 [version as of 2 July 2026]. BOE-A-1985-11672.
- Ley 5/1990, de 15 de junio, de Elecciones al Parlamento Vasco (Law 5/1990). Official State Gazette (in Spanish). 15 June 1990 [version as of 7 January 2016]. BOE-A-2012-2859.
