= 2024 Basque regional election =

Election in the Spanish region of the Basque Country

- 21 April 2024

All 75 seats in the Basque Parliament 38 seats needed for a majority
- Opinion polls
- Registered: 1,795,213 ▲0.0%
- Turnout: 1,077,456 (60.0%) ▲9.2 pp
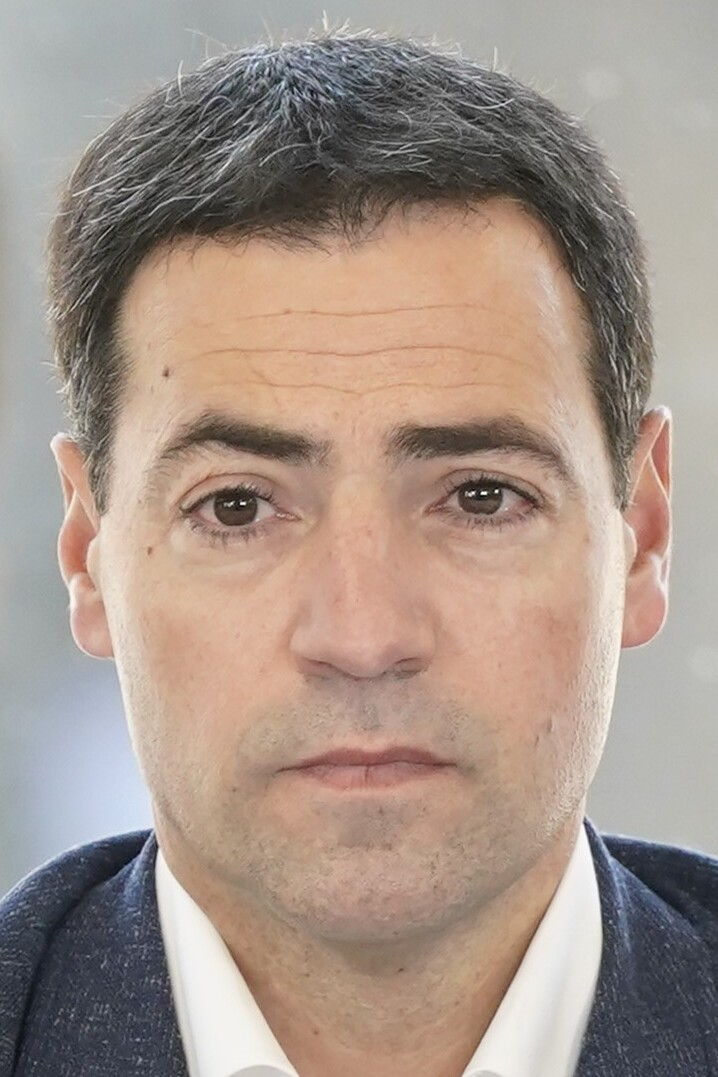

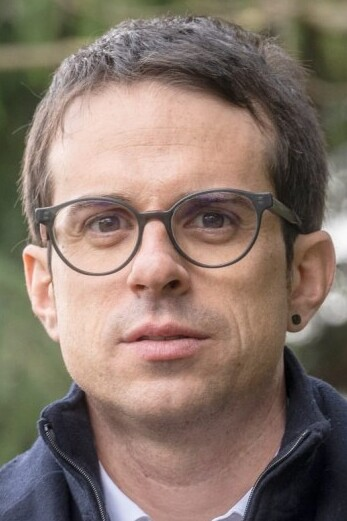

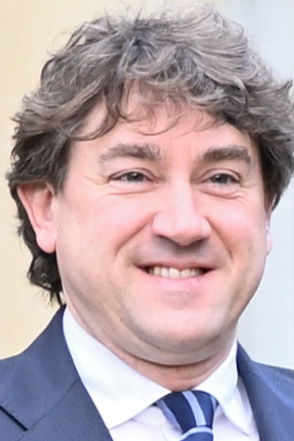

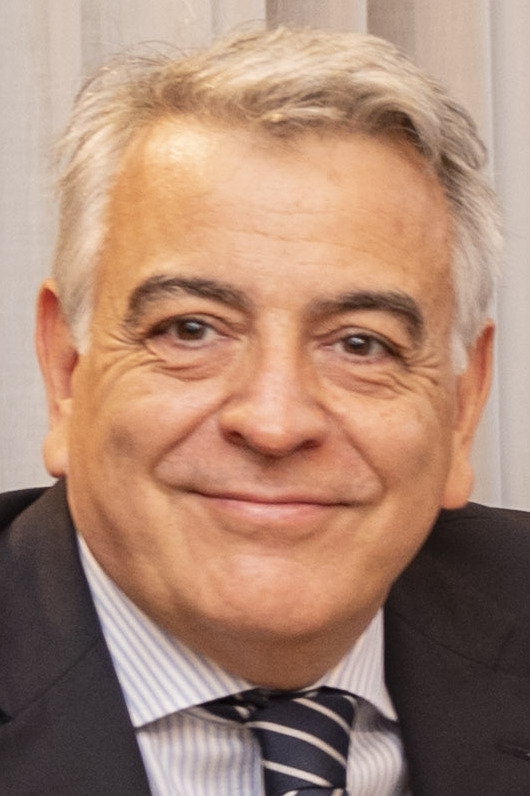

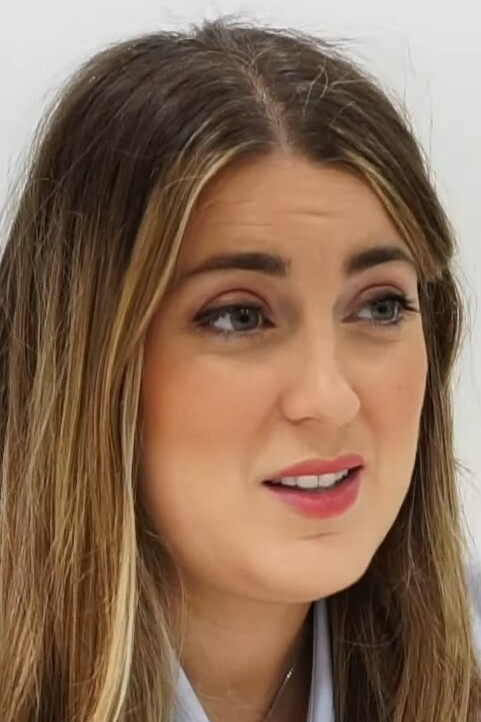

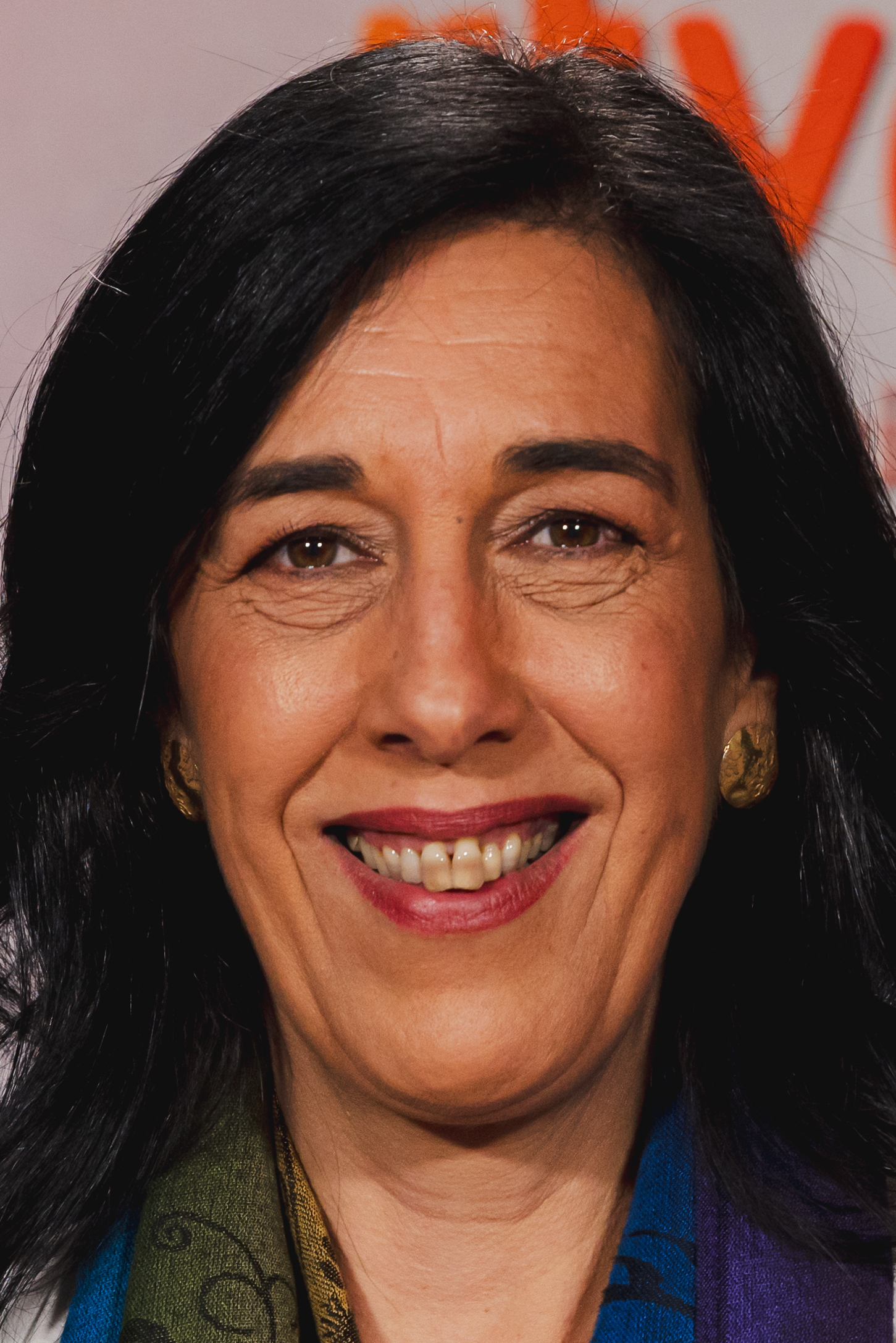
	First party	Second party	Third party
Leader	Imanol Pradales	Pello Otxandiano	Eneko Andueza
Party	EAJ/PNV	EH Bildu	PSE–EE (PSOE)
Leader since	27 January 2024	11 December 2023	30 October 2021
Leader's seat	Biscay	Álava	Biscay
Last election	31 seats, 38.7%	21 seats, 27.6%	10 seats, 13.5%
Seats won	27	27	12
Seat change	▼4	▲6	▲2
Popular vote	372,456	343,609	150,752
Percentage	34.8%	32.1%	14.1%
Swing	▼3.9 pp	▲4.5 pp	▲0.6 pp
	Fourth party	Fifth party	Sixth party
Leader	Javier de Andrés	Alba García	Amaia Martínez
Party	PP	Sumar	Vox
Leader since	4 November 2023	9 January 2024	3 August 2020
Leader's seat	Álava	Biscay (lost)	Álava
Last election	6 seats, 6.7% (Note: Results for PP+Cs in the 2020 election.)	2 seats (EP) (Note: Within the Elkarrekin Podemos alliance in the 2020 election.)	1 seat, 1.9%
Seats won	7	1	1
Seat change	▲1	▼1	0
Popular vote	98,144	35,402	21,696
Percentage	9.2%	3.3%	2.0%
Swing	▲2.5 pp	n/a	▲0.1 pp
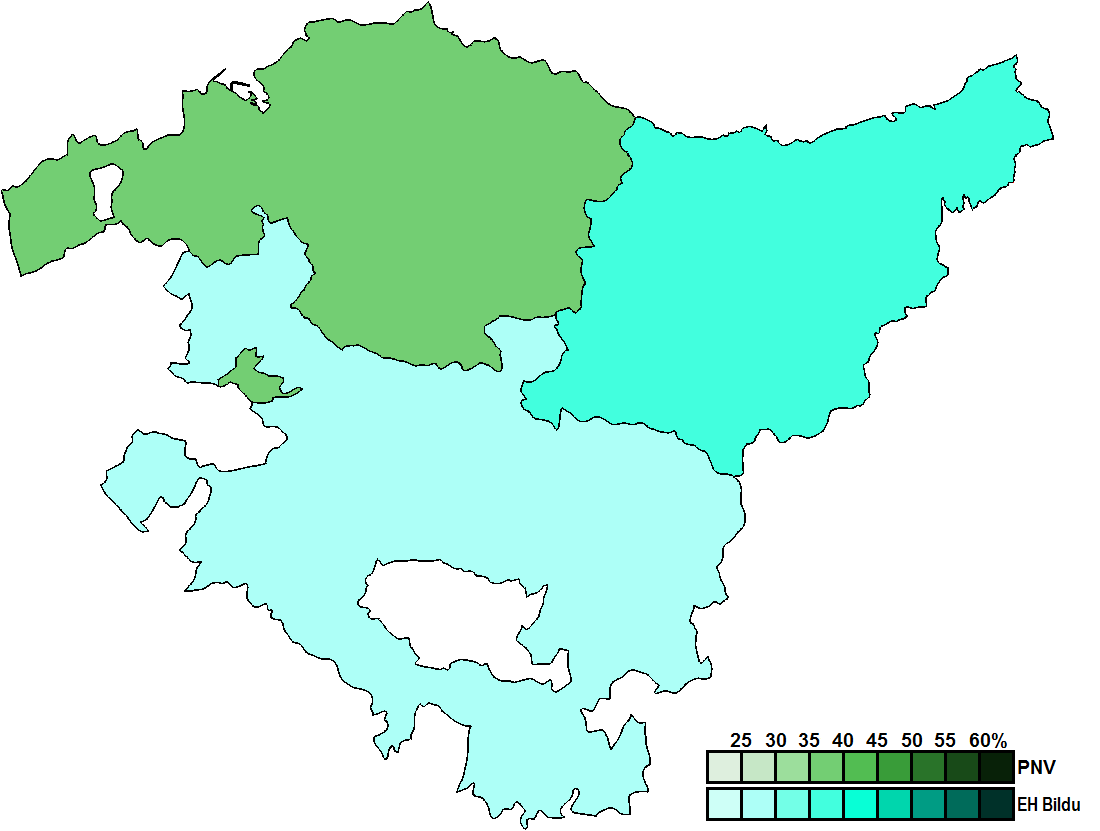
Lehendakari before election
Iñigo Urkullu
EAJ/PNV
Lehendakari after election
Imanol Pradales
EAJ/PNV

A regional election was held in the Basque Country on 21 April 2024 to elect the 13th Parliament of the autonomous community. All 75 seats in the Parliament were up for election.

This election was the first since 2009 not to see Iñigo Urkullu as the leading candidate of the Basque Nationalist Party (PNV), after the party chose to replace the incumbent Lehendakari with a low profile politician at the provincial level, Imanol Pradales, following 12 years of uninterrupted government. The main opposition, EH Bildu, also ran under a new candidate, Pello Otxandiano, amid speculation that long-time leader Arnaldo Otegi could have led the candidacy following the end of his disqualification from running for public office. All other parliamentary parties but Podemos and Vox also ran under new candidates: Eneko Andueza by the Socialist Party of the Basque Country–Basque Country Left (PSE–EE), Javier de Andrés by the People's Party (PP)—with the PP+Cs alliance being discontinued and Citizens (CS) deciding not to contest the election—and Alba García by Sumar.

The results showed a close race between the PNV and EH Bildu, with the latter slightly underperforming opinion polls but securing a large increase in its popular support. The PSE–EE, which had been the junior partner to the PNV-led government since 2016, saw an unexpected increase in support to secure its best result since 2012. The PP increased its seat totals by one compared to the PP+Cs results in 2020, whereas the dissolution of the Elkarrekin Podemos alliance saw Sumar clinging on to one seat and Podemos losing all its representation. Vox was able to retain its seat for Álava.

== Overview ==
Under the 1979 Statute of Autonomy, the Basque Parliament was the unicameral legislature of the Basque Autonomous Community, having legislative power in devolved matters, as well as the ability to grant or withdraw confidence from a lehendakari. The electoral and procedural rules were supplemented by national law provisions.

=== Date ===
The term of the Basque Parliament expired four years after the date of its previous election, unless it was dissolved earlier. The election decree was required to be issued no later than 25 days before the scheduled expiration date of parliament and published on the following day in the Official Gazette of the Basque Country (BOPV), with election day taking place 54 days after the decree's publication. The previous election was held on 12 July 2020, which meant that the chamber's term would have expired on 12 July 2024. The election decree was required to be published in the BOPV no later than 18 June 2024, setting the latest possible date for election day on 11 August 2024.

The lehendakari had the prerogative to dissolve the Basque Parliament at any given time and call a snap election, provided that no motion of no confidence was in process. In the event of an investiture process failing to elect a lehendakari within a 60-day period from the Parliament's reconvening, the chamber was to be automatically dissolved and a fresh election called.

Following the announcement by Galician president Alfonso Rueda of a snap election in Galicia for 18 February 2024, Urkullu was asked whether he would follow suit and make both elections be held simultaneously—as it had been the case since 2009. To this, he simply stated that "the Basque Country is not Galicia", distancing himself from Rueda's decision. Instead, it was expected that the Basque election would most likely be held in March or April 2024, to allow for more time to approve a final set of bills in the Basque Parliament as well as to avoid a simultaneous call with the European Parliament election on 9 June.

The Basque Parliament was officially dissolved on 27 February 2024 with the publication of the corresponding decree in the BOPV, setting election day for 21 April.

=== Electoral system ===
Voting for the Parliament was based on universal suffrage, comprising all Spanish nationals over 18 years of age, registered in the Basque Country and with full political rights, provided that they had not been deprived of the right to vote by a final sentence. Amendments in 2022 abolished the "begged" voting system (Spanish: Voto rogado), under which non-resident citizens were required to apply for voting. The expat vote system was attributed responsibility for a major decrease in the turnout of Spaniards abroad during the years it was in force.

The Basque Parliament had 75 seats. All were elected in three multi-member constituencies—corresponding to the provinces of Álava, Biscay and Gipuzkoa, each of which was assigned a fixed number of 25 seats to provide for an equal parliamentary representation of the three provinces—using the D'Hondt method and closed-list proportional voting, with a three percent-threshold of valid votes (including blank ballots) in each constituency. The use of this electoral method resulted in a higher effective threshold depending on district magnitude and vote distribution.

The law did not provide for by-elections to fill vacant seats; instead, any vacancies arising after the proclamation of candidates and during the legislative term were filled by the next candidates on the party lists or, when required, by designated substitutes.

=== Outgoing parliament ===
The table below shows the composition of the parliamentary groups in the chamber at the time of dissolution.

Parliamentary composition in February 2024
Groups	Parties	Legislators	
Groups	Parties	Seats	Total
Basque Nationalists Parliamentary Group	EAJ/PNV	31	31
EH Bildu Parliamentary Group	EH Bildu	21	21
Basque Socialists Parliamentary Group	PSE–EE (PSOE)	10	10
Elkarrekin Podemos–IU Parliamentary Group	Podemos	4	6
Elkarrekin Podemos–IU Parliamentary Group	EzAn–IU	2	6
Basque People's Parliamentary Group	PP	5 (Note: Luis Gordillo, former Cs legislator, joined the PP in October 2021.)	5
Mixed Group	Vox	1	2
Mixed Group	CS	1	2

== Parties and candidates ==
The electoral law allowed for parties and federations registered in the interior ministry, alliances and groupings of electors to present lists of candidates. Parties and federations intending to form an alliance were required to inform the relevant electoral commission within 10 days of the election call, whereas groupings of electors needed to secure the signature of at least one percent of the electorate in the constituencies for which they sought election, disallowing electors from signing for more than one list. Additionally, a balanced composition of men and women was required in the electoral lists, so that candidates of either sex made up at least 40 percent of the total composition.

Below is a list of the main parties and alliances which contested the election:

Candidacy	Parties and alliances	Leading candidate	Ideology	Previous result		Gov.	Ref.
Candidacy	Parties and alliances	Leading candidate	Ideology	Vote %	Seats	Gov.	Ref.
EAJ/PNV	List: Basque Nationalist Party (EAJ/PNV)	Imanol Pradales	Basque nationalism Christian democracy Social democracy	38.7%	31	Yes	
EH Bildu	List: Basque Country Gather (EH Bildu) – Create (Sortu) – Basque Solidarity (EA) – Alternative (Alternatiba)	Pello Otxandiano	Basque independence Abertzale left Socialism	27.6%	21	No	
PSE–EE (PSOE)	List: Socialist Party of the Basque Country–Basque Country Left (PSE–EE (PSOE))	Eneko Andueza	Social democracy	13.5%	10	Yes	
Podemos–AV	List: We Can (Podemos); Green Alliance (AV)	Miren Gorrotxategi	Left-wing populism Democratic socialism	9.3% (Note: Results for Elkarrekin Podemos–IU (8.0%, 6 seats) and Equo Berdeak (1.3%, 0 seats) in the 2020 election.)	6	No	
Sumar	List: Unite Movement (SMR); Plural Left–United Left (EzAn–IU) – Communist Party of the Basque Country (PCE/EPK) – The Dawn Marxist Organization (La Aurora (OM)) – Republican Left (IR); Greens Equo (VQ); More Basque Country–Build the Basque Country (ME/EE)	Alba García	Progressivism; Green politics Democratic socialism	9.3%	6	No	
PP	List: People's Party (PP)	Javier de Andrés	Conservatism; Christian democracy	6.7%	6	No	
Vox	List: Vox (Vox)	Amaia Martínez	Right-wing populism Ultranationalism; National conservatism	1.9%	1	No	

== Campaign ==
=== Timetable ===
The key dates are listed below (all times are CET):

- 26 February: The election decree is issued with the countersign of the lehendakari, after deliberation in the Government.
- 27 February: Formal dissolution of parliament and start of prohibition period on the inauguration of public works, services or projects.
- 1 March: Initial constitution of historical territory and zone electoral commissions with judicial members.
- 4 March: Division of constituencies into polling sections and stations.
- 8 March: Deadline for parties and federations to report on their electoral alliances.
- 11 March: Deadline for electoral register consultation for the purpose of possible corrections.
- 18 March: Deadline for parties, federations, alliances, and groupings of electors to present electoral lists.
- 20 March: Publication of submitted electoral lists in the Official Gazette of the Basque Country (BOPV).
- 25 March: Official proclamation of validly submitted electoral lists.
- 26 March: Publication of proclaimed electoral lists in the BOPV.
- 27 March: Deadline for the selection of polling station members by sortition.
- 4 April: Deadline for the appointment of non-judicial members to historical territory and zone electoral commissions.
- 5 April: Official start of electoral campaigning.
- 11 April: Deadline to apply for postal voting.
- 16 April: Start of legal ban on electoral opinion polling publication; deadline for non-resident citizens (electors residing abroad (CERA) and citizens temporarily absent from Spain) to vote by mail.
- 17 April: Deadline for postal and temporarily absent voting.
- 18 April: Deadline for CERA voting.
- 19 April: Last day of electoral campaigning.
- 20 April: Official election silence ("reflection day").
- 21 April: Election day (polling stations open at 9 am and close at 8 pm or once voters present in a queue at/outside the polling station at 8 pm have cast their vote); provisional vote counting.
- 26 April: Start of general vote counting, including CERA votes.
- 30 April: Deadline for the general vote counting.
- 11 May: Deadline for the proclamation of elected members.
- 18 May: Deadline for the publication of definitive election results in the BOPV.

=== Party slogans ===
Party or alliance	Original slogan	English translation	Ref.
EAJ/PNV	« Aukeratu Euskadi. Elige Bienestar »	"Choose the Basque Country. Choose wellbeing"	
EH Bildu	« Aldaketa da orain. El futuro en tus manos »	"The change is now. The future in your hands"	
PSE–EE (PSOE)	« Vota al que decide. Erabakia zurea »	"Vote for the one who decides. The decision is yours"	
Podemos–AV	« Elige izquierda »	"Choose the left"	
Sumar	« Es tu tiempo. Euskadi berria »	"It's your time. The new Basque Country"	
PP	« Por una Euskadi abierta/Euskadi ireki baten alde »	"For an open Basque Country"	
Vox	« Sabes que es verdad »	"You know it's true"	

=== Debates ===
2024 Basque regional election debates
Date	Organizer(s)	Moderator(s)	P Present (Note: Denotes a main invitee attending the event.) S Surrogate (Note: Denotes a main invitee not attending the event, sending a surrogate in their place.) NI Not invited A Absent invitee								
Date	Organizer(s)	Moderator(s)	PNV	EH Bildu	PSE–EE	Podemos	Sumar	PP	Vox	Audience	Ref.
9 April	Coordinadora de ONGD de Euskadi	Begoña Beristain	S Legarreta	S Urrea	S Gallastegi	S Gorritxo	S Martínez	S Garrido	NI	—	
9 April	RTVE	Xabier Fortes; Teresa Aguiló	S Díez	S Kortajarena	P Andueza	S De Uralde	P García	P De Andrés	P Martínez	14.2% (83,000) (Note: In the Basque Country, the debate was broadcast on La 1 (62,000; 10.6%) and 24 Horas (21,000; 3.6%). Nationwide, the debate was broadcast on 24 Horas (82,000; 0.7%).)	
10 April	Cadena SER	Eva Domaika	S Díez	S De Eguilaz	S Jilete	NI	NI	S López	NI	—	
10 April	EITB (Note: Basque-spoken debate.)	Nerea Reparaz	P Pradales	P Otxandiano	P Andueza	P Gorrotxategi	S Larrea	S Garrido	A	4.0%	
12 April	AMPEA	Eva Silván	S Melgosa	S Etxebarrieta	S Jilete	S González	S García	S Garrido	NI	—	
12 April	Cadena SER	Eva Domaika	S Díez	S Rodriguez	S Itxaso	S Soto	S Martínez	S Morales	A	—	
15 April	El Diario Vasco	Estrella Vallejo; Javier Roldán	P Pradales	P Otxandiano	P Andueza	S Soto	P García	P De Andrés	NI	—	
16 April	EITB	África Baeta; Xabier García Ramsden	P Pradales	P Otxandiano	P Andueza	P Gorrotxategi	P García	P De Andrés	P Martínez	17.4% (86,000)	
17 April	UN Etxea; EGK	Iratxe Uriarte	S Díez	S Del Valle	S Blanco	S Mestraitua	S Alonso	S Velasco	NI	—	
17 April	Cadena SER	Eva Domaika	S Olano	S Rodriguez	S Corcuera	S Soto	S Hernández	S Gotxi	A	—	
18 April	El Correo	Marta Madruga; Olatz Barriuso	P Pradales	P Otxandiano	P Andueza	P Gorrotxategi	P García	P De Andrés	P Martínez	—	
19 April	Cadena SER	Jon Egaña	P Pradales	P Otxandiano	P Andueza	P Gorrotxategi	P García	P De Andrés	P Martínez	—	

== Opinion polls ==
The tables below list opinion polling results in reverse chronological order, showing the most recent first and using the dates when the survey fieldwork was done, as opposed to the date of publication. Where the fieldwork dates are unknown, the date of publication is given instead. The highest percentage figure in each polling survey is displayed with its background shaded in the leading party's colour. If a tie ensues, this is applied to the figures with the highest percentages. The "Lead" column on the right shows the percentage-point difference between the parties with the highest percentages in a poll.

=== Graphical summary ===
Local regression trend line of poll results from 12 July 2020 to 21 April 2024, with each line corresponding to a political party.

=== Voting intention estimates ===
The table below lists weighted voting intention estimates. Refusals are generally excluded from the party vote percentages, while question wording and the treatment of "don't know" responses and those not intending to vote may vary between polling organisations. When available, seat projections determined by the polling organisations are displayed below (or in place of) the percentages in a smaller font; 38 seats were required for an absolute majority in the Basque Parliament.

Color key:

Poll conducted after legal ban on opinion polls

Polling firm/Commissioner	Fieldwork date	Sample size	Turnout	PNV	EH Bildu	PSE–EE (PSOE)	Podemos	PP+Cs	Vox	PP	CS	Sumar	Lead
2024 regional election	21 Apr 2024	—N/a	60.0	34.8; 27	32.1; 27	14.1; 12	2.2; 0	–	2.0; 1	9.2; 7	–	3.3; 1	2.7
Gizaker/EITB	15–21 Apr 2024	3,608	?	35.7; 26/28	32.9; 26/28	14.3; 10/12	3.6; 1/2	–	1.6; 0	8.4; 7	–	2.6; 0/2	2.8
Sigma Dos/El Mundo	13–20 Apr 2024	2,104	?	34.2; 26/28	33.4; 27/29	13.7; 10/11	3.0; 0/2	–	2.0; 0/1	8.6; 7/8	–	3.6; 1/3	0.8
KeyData/Público	15 Apr 2024	?	62.7	34.7; 28	34.5; 29	13.2; 10	2.3; 0	–	1.8; 0/1	8.5; 6/7	–	3.1; 1	0.2
Data10/OKDiario	14–15 Apr 2024	1,500	61	34.2; 27	34.4; 29	13.1; 10	2.2; 0	–	2.3; 1	8.4; 7	–	3.1; 1	0.2
SocioMétrica/El Español	10–14 Apr 2024	1,500	?	33.9; 27/28	34.8; 28/29	13.5; 10/11	2.3; 0	–	2.0; 0/1	8.1; 6/7	–	3.4; 0/3	0.9
EM-Analytics/Crónica Vasca	27 Mar–13 Apr 2024	1,391	?	34.7; 28	34.1; 29	12.9; 10	2.8; 0	–	2.0; 1	9.4; 7	–	2.9; 0	0.6
Target Point/El Debate	9–12 Apr 2024	1,001	?	35.2; 28/29	33.9; 27/28	13.3; 10/11	2.0; 0	–	1.7; 0/1	8.3; 7/8	–	3.5; 0/2	1.3
DYM/Henneo	8–12 Apr 2024	1,221	?	35.6; 28/29	36.0; 28/29	13.7; 9/10	1.8; 0/1	–	? 0	9.6; 7/8	–	2.3; 0/1	0.4
NC Report/La Razón	8–12 Apr 2024	1,000	66.7	35.3; 28/29	34.3; 28/29	12.3; 10	2.4; 0	–	1.9; 0/1	8.8; 7/8	–	3.2; 0/1	1.0
GAD3/ABC	8–12 Apr 2024	800	?	35.6; 27/29	34.2; 28/30	12.6; 10	2.6; 0/1	–	2.2; 0/1	7.5; 6/7	–	2.9; 0/2	1.3
Sigma Dos/El Mundo	1–12 Apr 2024	1,489	?	34.8; 26/28	34.1; 28/30	13.6; 10/11	2.0; 0/1	–	2.4; 0/1	8.5; 7/8	–	3.3; 0/2	0.7
Hamalgama Métrica/Vozpópuli	8–11 Apr 2024	1,000	66.1	34.8; 28	33.9; 29	12.5; 10	2.3; 0	–	2.3; 1	8.3; 7	–	2.9; 0	0.9
Gizaker/EITB	5–11 Apr 2024	1,800	60.8	34.2; 26/27	34.9; 28/29	14.0; 10/12	2.4; 0	–	1.5; 0	7.7; 7	–	3.8; 1/2	0.5
40dB/Prisa	5–10 Apr 2024	1,200	?	34.5; 27/28	35.4; 28/31	13.4; 10/11	2.3; 0	–	1.9; 0/1	8.2; 6/7	–	2.2; 0	0.9
Simple Lógica/elDiario.es	3–10 Apr 2024	946	56.0	33.8; 27/28	34.4; 28/29	12.8; 9/10	3.0; 0/1	–	2.0; 0	7.8; 6/7	–	3.6; 2/3	0.6
Celeste-Tel/Onda Cero	4–9 Apr 2024	1,100	65.2	35.5; 28	33.9; 29	13.2; 10	1.9; 0	–	1.8; 0	8.4; 7	–	3.0; 1	1.6
CIS	4–8 Apr 2024	4,025	?	32.6– 33.5	34.2– 35.1	13.3– 14.1	3.1– 3.2	–	2.7– 3.0	6.7– 7.0	–	3.1– 3.6	1.6
Data10/OKDiario	5–6 Apr 2024	1,500	?	33.7; 27	33.6; 28	13.2; 10	2.7; 1	–	2.2; 1	8.7; 7	–	3.2; 1	0.1
GAD3/Mediaset	1–5 Apr 2024	800	?	35.8; 28/29	34.2; 28/30	14.2; 10/12	2.4; 0	–	? 0	7.8; 6/7	–	? 0	1.6
Ikerfel/El Diario Vasco	26 Mar–5 Apr 2024	2,400	63.2	33.8; 27	34.2; 27/28	13.3; 10/11	2.6; 0	–	2.1; 0/1	8.6; 6/7	–	3.8; 3	0.5
NC Report/La Razón	25 Mar–5 Apr 2024	1,000	62.6	35.9; 28/29	33.0; 27/28	13.0; 10	2.8; 0	–	1.7; 0/1	8.6; 8	–	3.0; 0/1	2.9
KeyData/Público	4 Apr 2024	?	61.6	35.3; 28/29	33.2; 29	13.3; 10	2.5; 0	–	1.9; 0/1	8.7; 7	–	3.0; 0/1	2.1
Sigma Dos/El Mundo	18 Mar–4 Apr 2024	2,089	?	35.0; 28	32.6; 26/28	13.4; 10/11	2.0; 0	–	2.1; 0	9.8; 7/8	–	3.6; 1/3	2.4
Sigma Dos/El Mundo	18–26 Mar 2024	1,798	?	34.8; 27/28	32.9; 26/27	13.3; 10/11	2.9; 0/1	–	1.8; 0	10.0; 7/10	–	3.2; 0/2	1.9
EM-Analytics/Crónica Vasca	1–26 Mar 2024	1,391	?	34.1; 28	33.9; 28	12.4; 10	2.6; 0	–	2.3; 1	8.6; 7	–	3.2; 1	0.2
CIS (SocioMétrica) (Note: Alternative projection based on raw CIS data.)	18–22 Mar 2024	4,998	?	37.8; 30/31	31.1; 27/28	11.3; 8/9	2.2; 0	–	3.3; 1	8.2; 6/7	–	3.0; 1	6.7
CIS	18–22 Mar 2024	4,998	?	36.1; 30/31	33.0; 28/29	13.1; 10/11	2.5; 0/1	–	1.9; 0/1	7.7; 5/6	–	3.7; 0/2	3.1
Ikerfel/GPS	15–20 Mar 2024	3,030	61.2	35.7; 29	33.7; 29	13.1; 10	2.4; 0	–	1.9; 0	7.5; 6	–	2.8; 1	2.0
40dB/Prisa	15–19 Mar 2024	1,200	?	34.2; 25/28	33.7; 27/28	13.8; 11/12	2.8; 0/1	–	2.1; 1	8.1; 6/7	–	3.0; 0/2	0.5
Aztiker/Gara	11–18 Mar 2024	1,800	?	33.4; 26/28	34.0; 28/30	13.9; 11/12	3.0; 0/1	–	2.2; 0/1	8.5; 6/7	–	3.1; 1/2	0.6
Gizaker/EITB	8–14 Mar 2024	1,800	61.2	36.0; 27/28	32.7; 27/28	14.2; 11	3.7; 2	–	1.4; 0	8.3; 7	–	2.9; 0	3.3
EM-Analytics/Crónica Vasca	1–14 Mar 2024	1,284	?	34.0; 28	34.4; 28	12.0; 10	2.4; 0	–	2.5; 1	9.3; 7	–	3.4; 1	0.4
Sigma Dos/El Mundo	1–14 Mar 2024	1,207	?	34.3; 26/28	32.3; 26/27	14.7; 11	0.9; 0	–	1.3; 0	10.1; 7/8	–	6.0; 3	2.0
EM-Analytics/Crónica Vasca	16–28 Feb 2024	1,301	?	33.9; 27	34.2; 28	11.5; 9	2.4; 0	–	2.5; 1	9.0; 7	–	4.0; 3	0.3
EM-Analytics/Crónica Vasca	2–15 Feb 2024	1,287	?	34.1; 27	31.5; 26	14.6; 11	2.1; 0	–	2.6; 1	8.9; 7	–	5.1; 3	2.6
Ikerfel/GPS	30 Jan–2 Feb 2024	3,030	60.9	34.6; 27	32.4; 27	14.2; 11	3.0; 1	–	2.5; 1	7.7; 6	–	2.7; 2	2.2
EM-Analytics/Crónica Vasca	18 Jan–1 Feb 2024	1,392	?	33.5; 25	31.0; 26	15.3; 13	0.8; 0	–	2.2; 1	9.2; 7	–	5.3; 3	2.5
Gizaker/EITB	24–29 Jan 2024	1,800	64.2	35.8; 28	32.1; 26	14.8; 12	4.0; 2	–	1.6; 0	7.3; 6	–	3.2; 1	3.7
Gizaker/EITB	24–29 Jan 2024	1,800	64.2	35.8; 27	32.1; 26	14.8; 11	(Note: Within Sumar.)	–	1.6; 0	7.3; 6	–	7.2; 5	3.7
Ikerfel/El Diario Vasco	19–26 Jan 2024	2,400	?	? 25/26	? 27/28	? 11/12	? 0	–	? 0/1	? 6/8	–	? 3	?
Ikerfel/El Diario Vasco	19–26 Jan 2024	2,400	59.9	34.3; 25/26	33.0; 27	15.0; 11/12		–	1.6; 0/1	7.2; 5/6	–	7.1; 4/6	1.3
EM-Analytics/Crónica Vasca	1 Dec–17 Jan 2024	1,470	?	33.4; 26	31.7; 27	14.4; 11	1.0; 0	–	2.5; 1	8.9; 7	–	5.7; 3	1.7
Sigma Dos/El Mundo	26 Dec–9 Jan 2024	1,200	?	35.8; 28	32.0; 24/25	15.2; 11/13	–	–	1.3; 0	8.3; 6/7	–	7.0; 4	3.8
EM-Analytics/Crónica Vasca	1 Dec–4 Jan 2024	1,470	?	32.8; 26	31.9; 27	14.2; 11	1.4; 0	–	2.5; 1	9.6; 7	–	6.3; 3	0.9
Hamalgama Métrica/Vozpópuli	20–27 Dec 2023	1,000	65	37.1; 28	32.1; 26	10.6; 8		–	2.9; 1	10.6; 9	–	4.9; 3	5.0
Aztiker/Gara	7–20 Dec 2023	1,800	?	31.5; 24/25	32.1; 24/27	15.3; 11/12		–	2.8; 1	9.4; 6/8	–	7.7; 6	0.6
Ikerfel/GPS	21–24 Nov 2023	3,030	62.0	37.1; 29	29.9; 25	14.3; 11	6.5; 3	–	2.1; 0	8.0; 7	–	–	7.2
EM-Analytics/Electomanía	29 Oct–24 Nov 2023	1,390	?	32.4; 25	32.9; 26	14.4; 11	7.6; 5	–	2.5; 1	9.5; 7	–	–	0.5
Sigma Dos/El Mundo	13–15 Sep 2023	800	?	32.1; 25	32.5; 27	17.0; 13	5.1; 3	–	2.8; 1	7.9; 6	1.1; 0	–	0.4
2023 general election	23 Jul 2023	—N/a	65.1	24.0 (17)	23.9 (18)	25.3 (20)		–	2.6 (1)	11.6 (10)	–	11.1 (9)	1.3
EM-Analytics/Electomanía	28 May–15 Jun 2023	5,804	?	34.7; 28	31.2; 24	12.3; 9	9.2; 6	–	2.6; 1	9.5; 7	–	–	3.5
2023 foral elections	28 May 2023	—N/a	60.0	34.5 (26)	28.8 (24)	16.2 (13)	7.0 (5)	–	1.5 (1)	8.9 (7)	–	–	5.7
EM-Analytics/Electomanía	15 Mar–29 Apr 2022	228	?	36.2; 28	29.0; 24	12.2; 9	8.8; 6	8.6; 7	2.0; 1	(Note: Within PP+Cs.)		–	7.2
Ikerfel/GPS	21–25 Feb 2022	3,333	55.2	39.3; 31	27.3; 22	14.3; 12	7.0; 4	–	2.7; 1	6.2; 5	–	–	12.0
Ikerfel/GPS	29 Nov–3 Dec 2021	3,333	55.5	39.6; 31	27.5; 23	14.0; 10	6.7; 4	–	2.2; 1	6.7; 6	–	–	12.1
Ikerfel/GPS	27 Sep–1 Oct 2021	3,333	56.2	39.4; 31	27.7; 23	13.9; 11	6.8; 4	6.9; 5	1.9; 1			–	11.7
EM-Analytics/Electomanía	15 Sep 2021	?	?	40.0; 31	27.3; 23	13.5; 10	6.4; 4	8.2; 7	1.7; 0			–	12.7
Ikerfel/GPS	17–21 May 2021	3,333	55.1	39.0; 31	27.5; 22	13.6; 10	6.6; 4	7.7; 7	1.7; 1			–	11.5
2020 regional election	12 Jul 2020	—N/a	50.8	38.7; 31	27.6; 21	13.5; 10	8.0; 6	6.7; 6	1.9; 1			–	11.1

=== Voting preferences ===
The table below lists raw, unweighted voting preferences.

Polling firm/Commissioner	Fieldwork date	Sample size	PNV	EH Bildu	PSE–EE (PSOE)	Podemos	PP+Cs	Vox	PP	Sumar	Question	X mark	Lead
2024 regional election (Note: Does not include non-resident citizens.)	21 Apr 2024	—N/a	21.6	20.0	8.7	1.2	–	1.4	5.7	2.0	—N/a	37.5	1.6
DYM/Henneo	8–12 Apr 2024	1,221	17.7	25.2	8.3	3.9	–	1.5	7.6	3.6	20.9	8.2	7.5
Gizaker/EITB	5–11 Apr 2024	1,800	23.0	28.0	4.0	1.0	–	–	2.0	2.0	–	–	5.0
40dB/Prisa	5–10 Apr 2024	1,200	19.6	19.9	12.0	3.5	–	2.6	5.6	3.7	19.5	8.9	0.3
Simple Lógica/elDiario.es	3–10 Apr 2024	946	18.7	22.3	9.8	–	–	–	4.9	–	18.6	–	3.6
CIS	4–8 Apr 2024	4,025	22.8	25.2	8.9	1.9	–	1.5	4.6	1.4	26.3	5.2	2.4
CIS	18–22 Mar 2024	4,998	27.9	25.9	10.1	1.9	–	1.6	4.9	2.3	19.4	3.5	2.0
Ikerfel/GPS	15–20 Mar 2024	3,030	18.7	18.7	5.0	0.8	–	0.5	1.7	0.9	40.3	11.7	Tie
40dB/Prisa	15–19 Mar 2024	1,200	20.9	18.9	9.7	3.3	–	3.4	3.8	3.2	25.2	5.7	2.0
Gizaker/EITB	8–14 Mar 2024	1,800	22.5	26.9	5.0	1.3	–	0.3	1.4	1.2	29.9	9.7	4.4
Ikerfel/GPS	30 Jan–2 Feb 2024	3,030	21.3	19.8	7.6	1.3	–	1.3	2.6	1.5	30.6	12.1	1.5
Gizaker/EITB	24–29 Jan 2024	1,800	23.2	25.2	5.2	1.8	–	0.7	1.2	1.6	28.6	10.4	2.0
Ikerfel/GPS	21–24 Nov 2023	3,030	23.5	19.5	6.9	2.8	–	0.6	3.2	–	30.6	10.8	4.0
2023 general election	23 Jul 2023	—N/a	16.1	16.1	17.0		–	1.8	7.7	7.4	—N/a	32.4	0.9
2023 foral elections	28 May 2023	—N/a	20.4	17.0	9.6	4.1	–	0.9	5.2	–	—N/a	40.0	3.4
Ikerfel/GPS	21–25 Feb 2022	3,333	24.1	13.9	7.7	4.9	–	0.8	1.0	–	31.4	13.0	10.2
Ikerfel/GPS	29 Nov–3 Dec 2021	3,333	27.9	14.6	6.5	4.6	–	0.7	1.5	–	28.8	12.2	13.3
Ikerfel/GPS	27 Sep–1 Oct 2021	3,333	26.6	14.5	6.6	4.9	1.4	0.4		–	32.1	11.5	12.1
Ikerfel/GPS	17–21 May 2021	3,333	24.9	13.9	5.9	4.3	1.6	0.4		–	30.6	15.2	11.0
2020 regional election	12 Jul 2020	—N/a	20.3	14.5	7.1	4.2	3.5	1.0		–	—N/a	47.1	5.8

=== Victory preferences ===
The table below lists opinion polling on the victory preferences for each party in the event of a regional election taking place.

Polling firm/Commissioner	Fieldwork date	Sample size	PNV	EH Bildu	PSE–EE (PSOE)	Podemos	Vox	PP	Sumar	Other/ None	Question	Lead
CIS	4–8 Apr 2024	4,025	29.8	29.0	10.6	2.0	1.7	4.4	2.0	5.1	15.6	1.8
CIS	18–22 Mar 2024	4,998	34.9	30.0	10.9	1.9	1.4	5.0	2.3	3.8	9.9	4.9

=== Victory likelihood ===
The table below lists opinion polling on the perceived likelihood of victory for each party in the event of a regional election taking place.

Polling firm/Commissioner	Fieldwork date	Sample size	PNV	EH Bildu	PSE–EE (PSOE)	PP	Other/ None	Question	Lead
GAD3/Mediaset	8 Apr 2024	?	72.0	9.0	4.0	1.0	0.9	9.3	63.0
CIS	18–22 Mar 2024	4,998	60.5	27.2	2.0	–	0.9	9.3	33.3
EM-Analytics/Electomanía	31 Dec–12 Jan 2024	4,250	32.7	55.7	–	–	–	11.6	23.0

=== Preferred Lehendakari ===
The table below lists opinion polling on leader preferences to become lehendakari.

Polling firm/Commissioner	Fieldwork date	Sample size								Other/ None/ Not care	Question	Lead
Polling firm/Commissioner	Fieldwork date	Sample size	Pradales PNV	Otxan. EH Bildu	Andueza PSE–EE	Gorrotx. Podemos	De Andrés PP	Martínez Vox	García Sumar	Other/ None/ Not care	Question	Lead
DYM/Henneo	8–12 Apr 2024	1,221	28.0	30.9	–	–	–	–	–	–	41.1	2.9
Gizaker/EITB	5–11 Apr 2024	1,800	27.8	27.0	3.1	0.7	1.5	0.2	1.1	–	38.6	0.8
40dB/Prisa	5–10 Apr 2024	1,200	23.5	19.8	9.5	3.5	5.7	2.1	3.3	13.3	19.2	3.7
CIS	4–8 Apr 2024	4,025	28.2	26.8	8.9	2.8	4.0	1.7	1.8	6.3	19.4	1.4
CIS	18–22 Mar 2024	4,998	30.4	26.1	8.2	1.7	4.0	1.4	2.0	7.9	18.3	4.3
40dB/Prisa	15–19 Mar 2024	1,200	24.8	21.5	7.3	4.3	4.8	2.8	3.3	11.0	20.2	3.3
Gizaker/EITB	8–14 Mar 2024	1,800	26.0	26.1	4.1	1.7	0.8	0.3	0.8	–	40.2	0.1
Gizaker/EITB	24–29 Jan 2024	1,800	25.4	25.3	5.3	1.7	1.2	0.6	1.2	–	39.3	0.1

== Voter turnout ==
The table below shows registered voter turnout during the election. Figures for election day do not include non-resident citizens, while final figures do. Turnout data for the 2024 election was collected at 13:00 and 18:00 (instead of 12:00 and 17:00 for previous elections).

Province	Time (Election day)									Final		
Province	13:00 (Note: In 2020, turnout data was collected at 12:00.)			18:00 (Note: In 2020, turnout data was collected at 17:00.)			20:00			Final		
Province	2020	2024	+/–	2020	2024	+/–	2020	2024	+/–	2020	2024	+/–
Álava	13.51%	25.93%	+12.42	33.21%	48.73%	+15.52	50.31%	61.11%	+10.80	49.00%	59.39%	+10.39
Biscay	13.49%	27.43%	+13.94	36.40%	51.87%	+15.47	52.52%	63.41%	+10.89	50.40%	60.83%	+10.43
Gipuzkoa	15.48%	30.02%	+14.54	36.67%	50.73%	+14.06	54.57%	61.71%	+7.14	52.18%	58.99%	+6.81
Total	14.14%	28.05%	+13.91	36.02%	51.03%	+15.01	52.86%	62.52%	+9.66	50.78%	60.02%	+9.24

== Results ==
=== Overall ===
← Summary of the 21 April 2024 Basque Parliament election results
Parties and alliances	Popular vote			Seats	
Parties and alliances	Votes	%	±pp	Total	+/−
Basque Nationalist Party (EAJ/PNV)	372,456	34.82	−3.88	27	−4
Basque Country Gather (EH Bildu)	343,609	32.13	+4.53	27	+6
Socialist Party of the Basque Country–Basque Country Left (PSE–EE (PSOE))	150,752	14.09	+0.57	12	+2
People's Party (PP)^{1}	98,144	9.18	+2.47	7	+1
Unite (Sumar)^{2}	35,402	3.31	n/a	1	−1
United We Can–Green Alliance (Podemos/Ahal Dugu–AV)^{2}	23,888	2.23	n/a	0	−4
Vox (Vox)	21,696	2.03	+0.05	1	±0
Animalist Party with the Environment (PACMA)^{3}	5,585	0.52	−0.02	0	±0
Blank Seats to Leave Empty Seats (EB/AZ)	3,112	0.29	+0.02	0	±0
For a Fairer World (PUM+J)	1,683	0.16	+0.04	0	±0
To Be (Izan)	1,419	0.13	New	0	±0
Communist Party of the Workers of Spain (PCTE/ELAK)	666	0.06	±0.00	0	±0
Humanist Party (PH)	475	0.04	+0.01	0	±0
Welcome (OE)	187	0.02	+0.01	0	±0
Blank ballots	10,523	0.98	+0.04		
Total	1,069,597			75	±0
Valid votes	1,069,597	99.27	+0.01		
Invalid votes	7,859	0.73	−0.01		
Votes cast / turnout	1,077,456	60.02	+9.24		
Abstentions	717,757	39.98	−9.24		
Registered voters	1,795,213				
Sources
Footnotes: ^{1} People's Party results are compared to People's Party+Citizens totals in the 2020 election.; ^{3} Animalist Party with the Environment results are compared to Animalist Party Against Mistreatment of Animals totals in the 2020 election.

Popular vote
EAJ/PNV	34.82%
EH Bildu	32.13%
PSE–EE (PSOE)	14.09%
PP	9.18%
Sumar	3.31%
Podemos–AV	2.23%
Vox	2.03%
Others	1.23%
Blank ballots	0.98%

Seats
EAJ/PNV	36.00%
EH Bildu	36.00%
PSE–EE (PSOE)	16.00%
PP	9.33%
Sumar	1.33%
Vox	1.33%

=== Distribution by constituency ===
Constituency	PNV		EH Bildu		PSE–EE		PP		Sumar		Vox	
Constituency	%	S	%	S	%	S	%	S	%	S	%	S
Álava	26.7	7	29.1	8	16.2	4	15.9	4	3.7	1	3.7	1
Biscay	39.1	11	28.3	8	13.9	4	9.0	2	3.3	−	1.9	−
Gipuzkoa	31.4	9	39.8	11	13.4	4	6.4	1	3.1	−	1.5	−
Total	34.8	27	32.1	27	14.1	12	9.2	7	3.3	1	2.0	1

== Aftermath ==
=== Government formation ===
Investiture
Ballot →	20 June 2024	
Required majority →	38 out of 75	
Imanol Pradales (PNV): • PNV (27); • PSE–EE (12)	39 / 75	check
Pello Otxandiano (EH Bildu): • EH Bildu (27)	27 / 75	X mark
Abstentions/Blank ballots: • PP (7); • Sumar (1); • Vox (1)	9 / 75	
Absentees	0 / 75	

== Bibliography ==
- Ley Orgánica 3/1979, de 18 de diciembre, de Estatuto de Autonomía para el País Vasco (Organic Law 3/1979). Official State Gazette (in Spanish). 18 December 1979 [version as of 22 December 1979]. BOE-A-1979-30177.
- Ley 7/1981, de 30 de junio, sobre Ley de Gobierno (Law 7/1981). Official State Gazette (in Spanish). 30 June 1981 [version as of 26 December 2022]. BOE-A-2012-5927.
- Ley Orgánica 5/1985, de 19 de junio, del Régimen Electoral General (Organic Law 5/1985). Official State Gazette (in Spanish). 19 June 1985 [version as of 2 February 2024]. BOE-A-1985-11672.
- Ley 5/1990, de 15 de junio, de Elecciones al Parlamento Vasco (Law 5/1990). Official State Gazette (in Spanish). 15 June 1990 [version as of 7 January 2016]. BOE-A-2012-2859.
- Decreto 7/2024, de 26 de febrero, del Lehendakari, por el que se disuelve el Parlamento Vasco y se convocan elecciones (PDF) (Decree 7/2024). Official Gazette of the Basque Country (in Spanish). 26 February 2024.
