= Pello Otxandiano =

Basque engineer, university teacher and politician

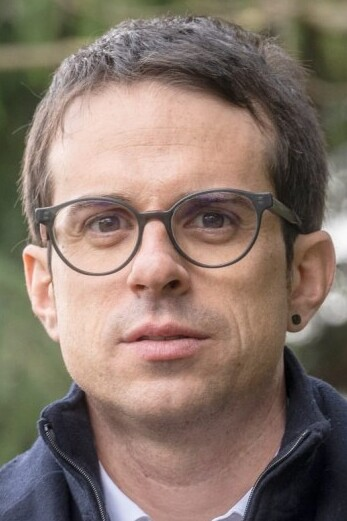
- Otxandiano in 2024

Member of the Basque Parliament
- Incumbent
- Assumed office 14 May 2024
- Constituency: Álava

Member of the Otxandio City Council
- In office 11 June 2011 – 13 June 2015

Personal details
- Born: Pello Otxandiano Kanpo; 20 August 1983 (age 43) Otxandio, Basque Country, Spain
- Party: EH Bildu
- Other political affiliations: Sortu (until 2021)
- Children: 2
- Education: Mondragon University; Chalmers University of Technology

Pello Otxandiano Kanpo (born 20 August 1983) is a Basque engineer, university professor and politician.

He is EH Bildu's programme director. He was also EH Bildu's candidate for head of the Basque Government in the 2024 Basque regional election.

== Biography ==
Pello Otxandiano was born in 1983 in Otxandio (Basque Country) to an abertzale family. He studied primary education at his hometown school, and secondary and Baccalaureate studies in Iurreta, at Juan Oriobiogoitia BHI and Iurreta LHI schools respectively.

He studied a licenciate degree in telecommunications engineering at Mondragon University. He later obtained a PhD in telecommunications engineering also at Mondragon University. During his PhD, he served an internship at the Chalmers University of Technology in Gothenburg (Sweden).

== Political career ==
He entered politics in 2011, when he was elected a councillor of the Otxandio City Council.

In 2023, the Political Bureau of EH Bildu proposed him as a candidate to become the Basque Government's Lehendakari for the 2024 regional election.

== Personal life ==
Otxandiano is a father to two daughters.
