= 2001 Basque regional election =

Election in the Spanish region of the Basque Country

- 13 May 2001

All 75 seats in the Basque Parliament 38 seats needed for a majority
- Opinion polls
- Registered: 1,813,356 ▼0.5%
- Turnout: 1,431,996 (79.0%) ▲9.0 pp
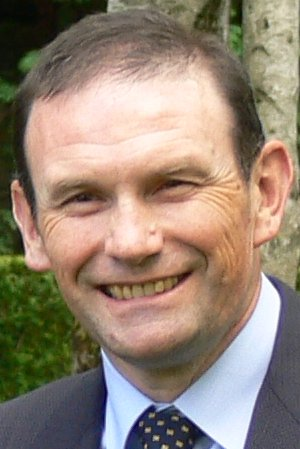

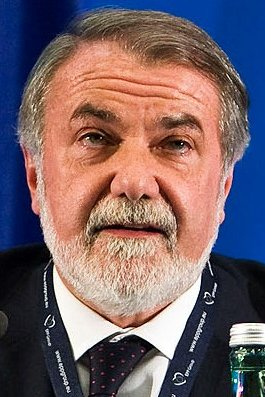

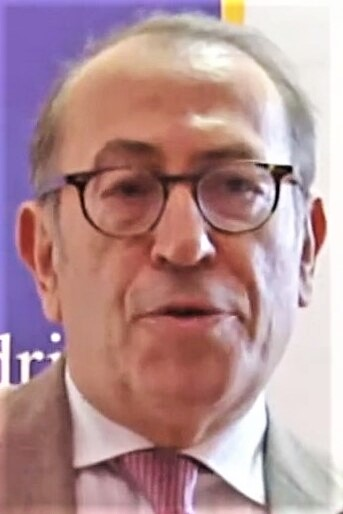

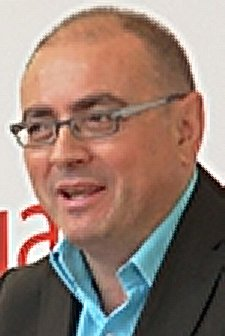
	First party	Second party	Third party
Leader	Juan José Ibarretxe	Jaime Mayor Oreja	Nicolás Redondo
Party	PNV–EA	PP	PSE–EE (PSOE)
Leader since	31 January 1998	26 February 2001	20 October 1997
Leader's seat	Álava	Biscay	Biscay
Last election	27 seats, 36.2% (Note: Results for EAJ/PNV (27.6%, 21 seats) and EA (8.6%, 6 seats) in the 1998 election.)	18 seats, 21.1% (Note: Results for PP (19.9%, 16 seats) and UA (1.2%, 2 seats) in the 1998 election.)	14 seats, 17.4%
Seats won	33	19	13
Seat change	▲6	▲1	▼1
Popular vote	604,222	326,933	253,195
Percentage	42.4%	22.9%	17.8%
Swing	▲6.2 pp	▲1.8 pp	▲0.4 pp
	Fourth party	Fifth party
Leader	Arnaldo Otegi	Javier Madrazo
Party	EH	IU/EB
Leader since	14 February 1998	14 May 1994
Leader's seat	Guipúzcoa	Biscay
Last election	14 seats, 17.7%	2 seats, 5.6%
Seats won	7	3
Seat change	▼7	▲1
Popular vote	143,139	78,862
Percentage	10.0%	5.5%
Swing	▼7.7 pp	▼0.1 pp
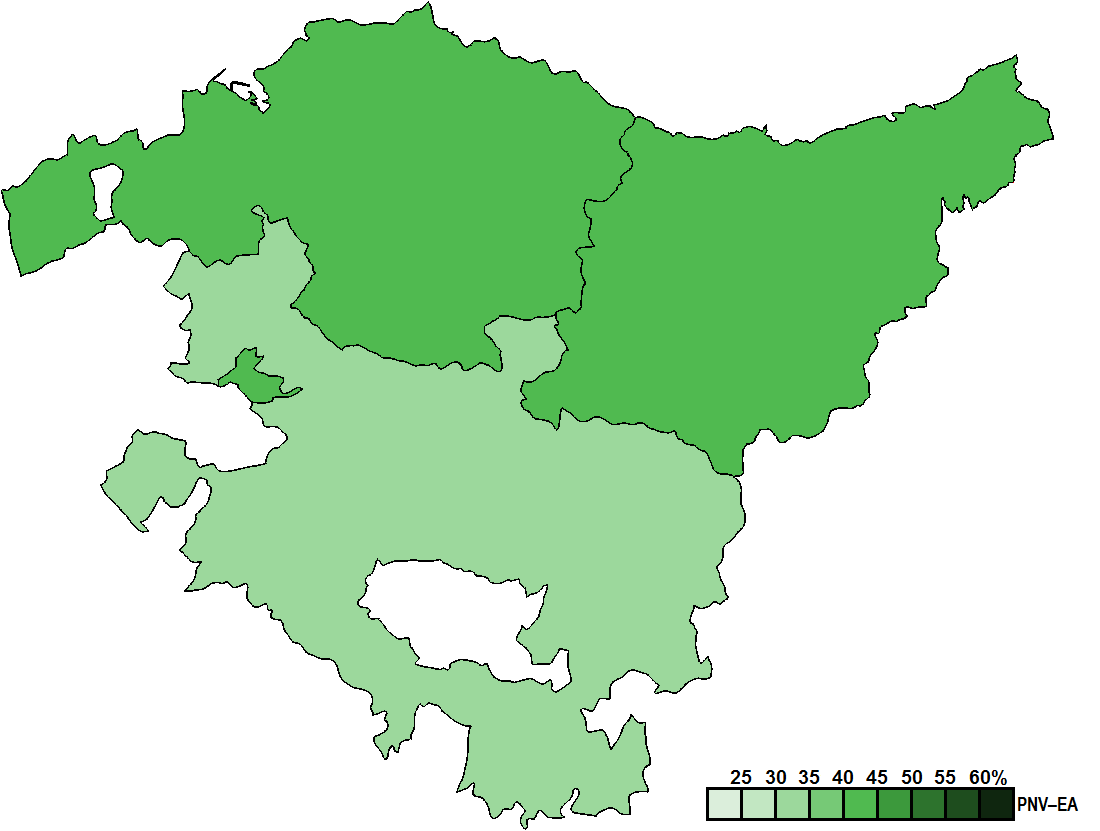
Lehendakari before election
Juan José Ibarretxe
EAJ/PNV
Lehendakari after election
Juan José Ibarretxe
EAJ/PNV

A regional election was held in the Basque Country on 13 May 2001 to elect the 7th Parliament of the autonomous community. All 75 seats in the Parliament were up for election.

The PNV–EA alliance, established by the Basque Nationalist Party (PNV) and Basque Solidarity (EA) parties which had formed the Basque government since 1998, won a landslide victory with 33 seats and 42.4% of the share, which represented their best combined result in history as well as the best performance for the top voted list in a Basque regional election, outperforming the PNV's own record in 1984. The People's Party (PP), which for this election ran in coalition with Alavese Unity (UA), came second with 22.9% of the share and 19 seats, whereas the Socialist Party of the Basque Country–Basque Country Left (PSE–EE) came in third with 13 seats and 17.8% of the vote. Together, they fell well short of their intended aim of commanding an overall majority in parliament that was able to oust the ruling PNV from power, but also one seat behind the PNV–EA result. The abertzale left Basque Citizens (EH) coalition obtained 7 seats and 10.0% of the vote, in what was seen as a mix of both tactical voting in favour of the PNV–EA list as well as a punishment to the political force because of its leadership's alleged collaboration with the banned separatist group ETA.

== Overview ==
Under the 1979 Statute of Autonomy, the Basque Parliament was the unicameral legislature of the Basque Autonomous Community, having legislative power in devolved matters, as well as the ability to grant or withdraw confidence from a lehendakari. The electoral and procedural rules were supplemented by national law provisions.

=== Date ===
The term of the Basque Parliament expired four years after the date of its previous election, unless it was dissolved earlier. The election decree was required to be issued no later than 25 days before the scheduled expiration date of parliament and published on the following day in the Official Gazette of the Basque Country (BOPV), with election day taking place 54 days after the decree's publication. The previous election was held on 25 October 1998, which meant that the chamber's term would have expired on 25 October 2002. The election decree was required to be published in the BOPV no later than 1 October 2002, setting the latest possible date for election day on 24 November 2002.

The lehendakari had the prerogative to dissolve the Basque Parliament at any given time and call a snap election, provided that no motion of no confidence was in process. In the event of an investiture process failing to elect a lehendakari within a 60-day period from the Parliament's reconvening, the chamber was to be automatically dissolved and a fresh election called.

The final months of 2000 had seen the government of the incumbent lehendakari, Juan José Ibarretxe, struggle to maintain a working parliamentary majority, with him barely surviving two motions of no confidence tabled by both the People's Party and the Socialist Party of the Basque Country in October 2000. After several weeks of speculation and of Ibarretxe rejecting a snap election, he finally acknowledged such possibility on 11 January 2001, tentatively setting election day for either "before or after the summer". The Basque Parliament was officially dissolved on 20 March 2001 with the publication of the corresponding decree in the BOPV, setting election day for 13 May.

=== Electoral system ===
Voting for the Parliament was based on universal suffrage, comprising all Spanish nationals over 18 years of age, registered in the Basque Country and with full political rights, provided that they had not been deprived of the right to vote by a final sentence, nor were legally incapacitated.

The Basque Parliament had 75 seats. All were elected in three multi-member constituencies—corresponding to the provinces of Álava, Biscay and Guipúzcoa, each of which was assigned a fixed number of 25 seats to provide for an equal parliamentary representation of the three provinces—using the D'Hondt method and closed-list proportional voting, with a three (Note: Amendments in 2000 had seen the electoral threshold being lowered from five to three percent.) percent of valid votes (which included blank ballots) being applied in each constituency. The use of this electoral method resulted in a higher effective threshold depending on district magnitude and vote distribution.

The law did not provide for by-elections to fill vacant seats; instead, any vacancies arising after the proclamation of candidates and during the legislative term were filled by the next candidates on the party lists or, when required, by designated substitutes.

=== Outgoing parliament ===
The table below shows the composition of the parliamentary groups in the chamber at the time of dissolution.

Parliamentary composition in March 2001
Groups	Parties	Legislators	
Groups	Parties	Seats	Total
Basque Nationalists Parliamentary Group	EAJ/PNV	21	21
Basque People's Parliamentary Group	PP	16	16
Basque Citizens' Parliamentary Group	EH	14	14
Basque Socialists Parliamentary Group	PSE–EE (PSOE)	14	14
Basque Solidarity Parliamentary Group	EA	6	6
Mixed Group	IU/EB	2	4
Mixed Group	UA	2	4

== Parties and candidates ==
The electoral law allowed for parties and federations registered in the interior ministry, alliances and groupings of electors to present lists of candidates. Parties and federations intending to form an alliance were required to inform the relevant electoral commission within 10 days of the election call, whereas groupings of electors needed to secure the signature of at least one percent of the electorate in the constituencies for which they sought election, disallowing electors from signing for more than one list.

Below is a list of the main parties and alliances which contested the election:

Candidacy	Parties and alliances	Leading candidate	Ideology	Previous result		Gov.	Ref.
Candidacy	Parties and alliances	Leading candidate	Ideology	Vote %	Seats	Gov.	Ref.
PNV–EA	List: Basque Nationalist Party (EAJ/PNV); Basque Solidarity (EA)	Juan José Ibarretxe	Basque nationalism Christian democracy Conservative liberalism	36.2%	27	Yes	
PP	List: People's Party (PP); Alavese Unity (UA)	Jaime Mayor Oreja	Conservatism; Christian democracy	21.1%	18	No	
EH	List: Popular Unity (HB) – Basque Nationalist Action (EAE/ANV)	Arnaldo Otegi	Basque independence Abertzale left Revolutionary socialism	17.7%	14	No	
PSE–EE (PSOE)	List: Socialist Party of the Basque Country–Basque Country Left (PSE–EE (PSOE))	Nicolás Redondo	Social democracy	17.4%	14	No	
IU/EB	List: United Left (IU/EB)	Javier Madrazo	Socialism; Communism	5.6%	2	No	

== Opinion polls ==
The tables below list opinion polling results in reverse chronological order, showing the most recent first and using the dates when the survey fieldwork was done, as opposed to the date of publication. Where the fieldwork dates are unknown, the date of publication is given instead. The highest percentage figure in each polling survey is displayed with its background shaded in the leading party's colour. If a tie ensues, this is applied to the figures with the highest percentages. The "Lead" column on the right shows the percentage-point difference between the parties with the highest percentages in a poll.

=== Voting intention estimates ===
The table below lists weighted voting intention estimates. Refusals are generally excluded from the party vote percentages, while question wording and the treatment of "don't know" responses and those not intending to vote may vary between polling organisations. When available, seat projections determined by the polling organisations are displayed below (or in place of) the percentages in a smaller font; 38 seats were required for an absolute majority in the Basque Parliament.

Color key:

Exit poll

Polling firm/Commissioner	Fieldwork date	Sample size	Turnout	PNV	PP	EH	PSE–EE (PSOE)	EA	IU/EB	UA	Lead
2001 regional election	13 May 2001	—N/a	79.0	42.4; 33	22.9; 19	10.0; 7	17.8; 13	(Note: Within PNV.)	5.5; 3	(Note: Within PP.)	19.5
Eco Consulting/EITB	13 May 2001	?	?	? 29/30	? 20/21	? 9/10	? 13/14		? 3		?
Opitel/Tele 5	13 May 2001	?	?	? 30/31	? 19/20	? 9/10	? 12/13		? 3		?
COPE	13 May 2001	?	?	? 30	? 20	? 9	? 14		? 2		?
Sigma Dos/Antena 3	13 May 2001	?	?	? 29/31	? 20/24	? 7/9	? 13/15		? 2/3		?
Gallup/RTVE	13 May 2001	?	?	? 29/31	? 19/22	? 10/11	? 13/14		? 3		?
Ibecom/La Razón	6 May 2001	?	?	? 24	? 22	? 11	? 15		? 3		?
Ipsos–Eco/ABC	2–3 May 2001	900	73–74	34.5; 25/28	24.3; 20/22	14.9; 10/11	19.1; 14/15		4.9; 2/3		10.2
Sigma Dos/El Mundo	27 Apr–3 May 2001	1,400	?	38.2; 27/30	24.7; 20/23	11.5; 7/8	19.0; 14/16		4.4; 1/3		13.5
Demoscopia/El País	25 Apr–3 May 2001	1,814	75	39.6; 30	23.9; 21/22	10.0; 7/8	20.0; 15		4.2; 1/2		15.7
Sondaxe/Diario 16	25 Apr–3 May 2001	1,800	?	? 30	? 19	? 9	? 14		? 3		?
Bergareche/El Correo	26–29 Apr 2001	3,600	?	? 28	? 20	? 10	? 14		? 3		?
Sondaxe/La Voz de Galicia	25–28 Apr 2001	900	?	41.0; 30/33	22.9; 19/21	? 7/9	17.7; 12/14		4.4; 2/3		18.1
CIS	17–25 Apr 2001	2,487	73.5	38.7; 28/31	24.7; 21/23	11.6; 8/9	18.6; 14/16		4.2; 1/2		14.0
Opina/La Vanguardia	19–20 Apr 2001	1,500	?	37.0; 27/28	22.5; 20/21	15.5; 10/12	18.5; 14		4.0; 2		14.5
Ikertalde/GPS	14–28 Mar 2001	2,996	72.5	37.5; 27/29	23.3; 19/20	13.2; 9/10	19.5; 14/16		4.4; 3		14.2
Opina/Cadena SER	19–20 Mar 2001	1,500	?	38.6; 29	23.4; 18/19	13.5; 10/11	18.0; 13/15		4.5; 3		15.2
PSOE	9–12 Mar 2001	1,800	?	? 29/30	? 18/19	? 9/10	? 14/15		? 2/3		?
Opitel/Tele 5	4 Mar 2001	?	?	? 26	? 18	? 9	? 15	? 4	? 2	? 1	?
Ipsos–Eco/ABC	21–22 Feb 2001	900	?	31.7; 22/23	21.4; 19/20	15.7; 10/11	18.9; 14/16	6.5; 4	4.3; 3	0.8; 1	10.3
CIS	31 Jan–18 Feb 2001	2,482	72.0	31.3; 22/24	21.6; 18/20	14.4; 10/11	18.4; 14/15	7.0; 5	4.5; 2/3	0.7; 0/1	9.7
PP	17 Feb 2001	2,300	?	? 21/23	? 21/24	? 9/12	? 14/16	? 2/4	? 1/3	–	?
Ikertalde/GPS	27 Nov–15 Dec 2000	2,016	70.0	29.4; 21/23	21.7; 18/20	14.6; 10/11	19.2; 16	7.6; 5	4.9; 3	0.3; 0	7.7
CPS/EHU	2–17 Nov 2000	1,800	?	28.3; 22	23.4; 22	14.5; 9	17.8; 14	8.1; 5	5.0; 3		4.9
CPS/EHU	2–17 Nov 2000	1,800	?	28.3; 22	22.8; 20	14.5; 10	17.8; 14	8.1; 5	5.0; 3	0.6; 1	5.5
Bergareche/El Correo (Note: Undecided and/or abstentionists excluded.)	26–29 Oct 2000	750	75.2	32.4; 24	20.8; 18	14.8; 12	16.4; 12	7.1; 5	5.1; 3	1.0; 1	11.6
CPS/EHU	5–16 Jun 2000	1,800	?	27.2; 21	22.5; 20	15.0; 11	17.0; 14	7.5; 5	5.1; 3	0.7; 1	4.7
2000 general election	12 Mar 2000	—N/a	63.8	30.4 (24)	28.3 (25)	–	23.3 (19)	7.6 (5)	5.4 (2)	–	2.1
1999 EP election	13 Jun 1999	—N/a	64.5	33.9 (26)	19.8 (18)	19.5 (14)	19.5 (17)		3.9 (0)	–	14.1
1999 foral elections	13 Jun 1999	—N/a	64.8	34.7 (27)	19.1 (17)	19.7 (15)	18.3 (14)		4.6 (1)	0.8 (1)	15.0
1998 regional election	25 Oct 1998	—N/a	70.0	27.6; 21	19.9; 16	17.7; 14	17.4; 14	8.6; 6	5.6; 2	1.2; 2	7.7

=== Voting preferences ===
The table below lists raw, unweighted voting preferences.

Polling firm/Commissioner	Fieldwork date	Sample size	PNV	PP	EH	PSE–EE (PSOE)	EA	IU/EB	UA	Question	X mark	Lead
2001 regional election (Note: Does not include non-resident citizens.)	13 May 2001	—N/a	33.1	17.9	7.9	13.8		4.3		—N/a	20.1	15.2
CIS	17–25 Apr 2001	2,487	28.4	6.2	5.2	7.4		2.4		39.4	8.9	21.0
CIS	31 Jan–18 Feb 2001	2,482	24.1	5.2	6.4	8.6	2.9	1.8	0.1	34.2	13.7	15.5
2000 general election	12 Mar 2000	—N/a	19.4	18.0	–	14.9	4.8	3.5	–	—N/a	35.5	1.4
1999 EP election	13 Jun 1999	—N/a	22.0	12.8	12.6	12.6		2.6	–	—N/a	34.7	9.2
1999 foral elections	13 Jun 1999	—N/a	22.3	12.2	12.7	11.8		3.0	0.5	—N/a	35.2	9.6
1998 regional election	25 Oct 1998	—N/a	19.1	13.8	12.3	12.0	5.9	3.9	0.9	—N/a	29.4	5.3

=== Victory preferences ===
The table below lists opinion polling on the victory preferences for each party in the event of a regional election taking place.

Polling firm/Commissioner	Fieldwork date	Sample size	PNV	PP	EH	PSE–EE (PSOE)	EA	IU/EB	UA	Other/ None	Question	Lead
CIS	17–25 Apr 2001	2,487	34.6	6.7	5.4	8.4		2.6		9.1	33.3	26.2
Opina/La Vanguardia	19–20 Apr 2001	1,500	37.2	11.6	6.9	9.1		2.7		–	32.5	25.6
CIS	31 Jan–18 Feb 2001	2,482	29.8	6.0	6.8	10.0	3.4	2.2	0.1	1.4	40.3	19.8

=== Victory likelihood ===
The table below lists opinion polling on the perceived likelihood of victory for each party in the event of a regional election taking place.

Polling firm/Commissioner	Fieldwork date	Sample size	PNV	PP	EH	PSE–EE (PSOE)	IU/EB	Other/ None	Question	Lead
Opina/La Vanguardia	19–20 Apr 2001	1,500	64.2	6.3	0.2	1.2	0.0	–	28.1	57.9

=== Preferred Lehendakari ===
The table below lists opinion polling on leader preferences to become lehendakari.

Polling firm/Commissioner	Fieldwork date	Sample size							Other/ None/ Not care	Question	Lead
Polling firm/Commissioner	Fieldwork date	Sample size	Ibarretxe PNV	M. Oreja PP	Otegi EH	Redondo PSE–EE	Madrazo EB–B	Errazti EA	Other/ None/ Not care	Question	Lead
CIS	17–25 Apr 2001	2,487	40.5	7.9	–	7.3	–	–	17.3	27.0	32.6
Opina/La Vanguardia	19–20 Apr 2001	1,500	39.8	12.1	4.6	7.1	1.4	–	–	35.0	27.7
CIS	31 Jan–18 Feb 2001	2,482	34.3	5.9	3.6	8.1	0.8	1.0	15.3	31.3	26.2

=== Predicted Lehendakari ===
The table below lists opinion polling on the perceived likelihood for each leader to become lehendakari.

Polling firm/Commissioner	Fieldwork date	Sample size						Other/ None/ Not care	Question	Lead
Polling firm/Commissioner	Fieldwork date	Sample size	Ibarretxe PNV	M. Oreja PP	Otegi EH	Redondo PSE–EE	Madrazo EB–B	Other/ None/ Not care	Question	Lead
Opina/La Vanguardia	19–20 Apr 2001	1,500	55.5	8.1	0.2	1.6	0.1	–	34.5	47.4

== Results ==
=== Overall ===
← Summary of the 13 May 2001 Basque Parliament election results →
Parties and alliances	Popular vote			Seats	
Parties and alliances	Votes	%	±pp	Total	+/−
Basque Nationalist Party–Basque Solidarity (PNV–EA)^{1}	604,222	42.38	+6.19	33	+6
People's Party (PP)^{2}	326,933	22.93	+1.84	19	+1
Socialist Party of the Basque Country–Basque Country Left (PSE–EE (PSOE))	253,195	17.76	+0.41	13	−1
Basque Citizens (EH)	143,139	10.04	−7.62	7	−7
United Left (IU/EB)	78,862	5.53	−0.07	3	+1
Humanist Party (PH)	3,708	0.26	±0.00	0	±0
Party of the Democratic Karma (PKD)	2,000	0.14	New	0	±0
Workers for Democracy Coalition (TD)	1,017	0.07	New	0	±0
Freedom (Askatasuna)	663	0.05	New	0	±0
Carlist Party (EKA/PC)	530	0.04	New	0	±0
Blank ballots	11,508	0.81	−0.58		
Total	1,425,777			75	±0
Valid votes	1,425,777	99.57	+0.10		
Invalid votes	6,219	0.43	−0.10		
Votes cast / turnout	1,431,996	78.97	+8.98		
Abstentions	381,360	21.03	−8.98		
Registered voters	1,813,356				
Sources
Footnotes: ^{1} Basque Nationalist Party–Basque Solidarity results are compared to the combined totals of Basque Nationalist Party and Basque Solidarity in the 1998 election.; ^{2} People's Party results are compared to the combined totals of the People's Party and Alavese Unity in the 1998 election.

Popular vote
PNV–EA	42.38%
PP	22.93%
PSE–EE (PSOE)	17.76%
EH	10.04%
IU/EB	5.53%
Others	0.56%
Blank ballots	0.81%

Seats
PNV–EA	44.00%
PP	25.33%
PSE–EE (PSOE)	17.33%
EH	9.33%
IU/EB	4.00%

=== Distribution by constituency ===
Constituency	PNV–EA		PP		PSE–EE		EH		IU/EB	
Constituency	%	S	%	S	%	S	%	S	%	S
Álava	33.6	9	32.5	9	20.4	5	6.1	1	5.9	1
Biscay	43.4	12	23.4	6	18.1	4	8.0	2	5.6	1
Guipúzcoa	44.3	12	18.0	4	16.1	4	15.1	4	5.2	1
Total	42.4	33	22.9	19	17.8	13	10.0	7	5.5	3

== Aftermath ==
=== Government formation ===
Investiture
Ballot →	11 July 2001 (Note: 7 EH MPs did not participate in any of the votes.)		12 July 2001	
Required majority →	38 out of 75		Simple	
Juan José Ibarretxe (PNV): • PNV (26); • EA (7) (6 on 12 Jul); • IU/EB (3) (on 12 Jul)	33 / 75	X mark	35 / 75	check
Abstentions/Blank ballots: • PP (19); • PSE–EE (13); • IU/EB (3) (on 11 Jul)	35 / 75		32 / 75	
Absentees: • EA (1) (on 12 Jul)	0 / 75		1 / 75	

== Bibliography ==
- Ley Orgánica 3/1979, de 18 de diciembre, de Estatuto de Autonomía para el País Vasco (Organic Law 3/1979). Official State Gazette (in Spanish). 18 December 1979 [version as of 22 December 1979]. BOE-A-1979-30177.
- Ley 7/1981, de 30 de junio, sobre Ley de Gobierno (Law 7/1981). Official State Gazette (in Spanish). 30 June 1981 [version as of 23 November 1988]. BOE-A-2012-5927.
- Ley Orgánica 5/1985, de 19 de junio, del Régimen Electoral General (Organic Law 5/1985). Official State Gazette (in Spanish). 19 June 1985 [version as of 30 June 2000]. BOE-A-1985-11672.
- Ley 5/1990, de 15 de junio, de Elecciones al Parlamento Vasco (Law 5/1990). Official State Gazette (in Spanish). 15 June 1990 [version as of 7 November 2000]. BOE-A-2012-2859.
- Decreto 2/2001, de 19 de marzo, del Lehendakari, por el que se disuelve el Parlamento Vasco y se convocan elecciones (PDF) (Decree 2/2001). Official Gazette of the Basque Country (in Spanish). 19 March 2001.
