= List of political parties in the Basque Country =

Due to the complex political makeup of the Basque Country, the picture of existing political parties, their history and political positions is equally complex.

The region is split between two states, Spain and France. On the French side, parties that are of specifically Basque coloration operate mainly at the local and departmental level, in the case of the Northern Basque Country the Département Pyrénées-Atlantiques.

On the Spanish side, the region with Basque ties is split between the Foral Community of Navarre, the Autonomous Community of the Basque Country (BAC) and the exclave of Castile and León, Treviño.

Some political parties operate only in a single region, others operate in more than one region, occasionally under a different name. They cover the entire spectrum, from ultra-nationalist parties through moderate nationalist parties, socialists, conservatives, green parties and other groupings.

== List of active parties and coalition groupings ==
=== Basque Nationalist Party (EAJ-PNV) ===
Active in the BAC, Navarre (in the Geroa Bai coalition) and the North (as EAJ-PNB); Christian-democrat, moderate nationalist, regionalist.

=== Batzarre ===
Batzarre is the Navarrese branch of Zutik; nationalist, socialist.

=== Berdeak - Los Verdes ===
Formerly Euskal Herriko Berdeak-Euskal Berdeak/Verdes del País Vasco-Verdes Vascos, founded in 1990 and later joined with the national Confederation of the Greens.

=== Party of the Democratic Karma (PKD) ===
A non-serious party based in the BAC.

=== People's Party of Euskadi ===
Active in the BAC and Navarre; Basque branch of the People's Party of Spain, Christian-democrat, conservative.

=== Socialist Party of the Basque Country (PSE-EE) ===
Active in the BAC and Navarre; Basque branch of the Spanish Socialist Workers' Party, social-democrat.

== List of outlawed parties and coalition groupings ==
=== Communist Party of the Basque Homelands (EHAK-PCTV) ===
Active in the BAC until outlawed by the Spanish Supreme Court in 2008.

=== Batasuna ===
Active in the BAC, Navarre (outlawed in both) and the North (currently legal as Batasuna); ultra-nationalist, pro-independence, political arm of ETA.

=== Demokrazia Hiru Milioi (D3M) ===
Formed in 2009 and declared illegal before the 2009 election.

== List of parties and coalition groupings no longer active ==
=== Aralar Party ===
Active in the BAC and Navarre (in the Nafarria Bai coalition); socialist and pro-independence.

=== Basque Nationalist Republican Party ===
Founded in 1911 and active in the future BAC; progressive, nationalist.

=== Communist Movement of Euskadi (MCE-EMK) ===
The party split off the Communist Movement in the BAC in 1983. In 1991 it merged with the Spanish Liga Comunista Revolucionaria to form Zutik; communist.

=== Democracia Cristiana Vasca (DCV-EKD) ===
Active in the BAC; Christian-democrat, pro-autonomy, non-nationalist.

=== Euskadiko Ezkerra (EE) ===
The party was active in the BAC and formed as a coalition of Euskal Iraultzarako Alderdia (EIA) and other Marxist groupings in 1977. Most of the party later merged with the Socialist Party of the Basque Country, the Basque branch of the Spanish Socialist Workers' Party.

=== Euskal Ezkerra ===
A breakaway from Euskadiko Ezkerra formed in 1991 when Euskadiko Ezkerra merged with the Basque branch of the Spanish Socialist Workers' Party (PSOE). It then merged with Eusko Alkartasuna in a coalition but left after the 1989 election and dissolved.

=== Navarrese Union of the Left (Unai) ===
Active in Navarre.

=== Unidad Alavesa ===
Active in Álava (BAC) from 1989 to 2005; center-right, Alavan regionalist.

=== Union, Progress and Democracy (UPyD) ===
Based in the BAC but with national outlook; Spanish nationalist, progressive.

=== Zutik ===
Active in the BAC but also Navarre (as Batzarre). It formed in 1991 through the merger of the Liga Comunista Revolucionaria and the Communist Movement of Euskadi; nationalist, socialist.
