= Eneko Andueza =

Spanish politician

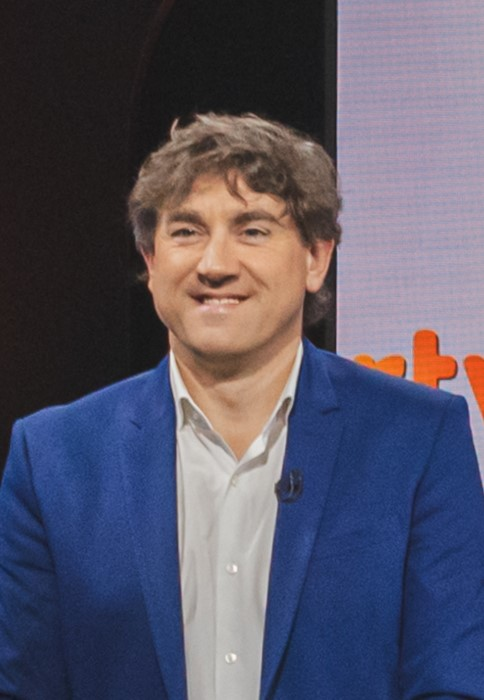
- Eneko Andueza in 2024

Secretary General of the PSE–EE
- Incumbent
- Assumed office 30 October 2021
- Preceded by: Idoia Mendia

Member of the Basque Parliament
- Incumbent
- Assumed office 21 October 2016
- Constituency: Gipuzkoa

Member of the Eibar City Council
- In office 7 June 2008 – 20 October 2016

Member of the Ordizia City Council
- In office 2004–2006

Personal details
- Born: Eneko Andueza Lorenzo; 11 June 1979 (age 47) Eibar, Basque Country, Spain
- Party: PSE–EE (1996–present)
- Children: 4
- Education: University of the Basque Country
- Occupation: Political scientist • Politician

Eneko Andueza Lorenzo (born 11 June 1979) is a Spanish Socialist Workers' Party (PSOE) politician. He has served in the Basque Parliament since 2016 and led the Socialist Party of the Basque Country–Basque Country Left (PSE-EE) since 2021.

== Biography ==
Born in Eibar, Gipuzkoa, Andueza joined the Socialist Youth of Spain at the age of 17. He graduated in Political Sciences and Administration from the University of the Basque Country.

Andueza's early political years were marked by assassinations of members of Basque anti-separatist parties by ETA, such as Isaías Carrasco in Mondragón in 2008. Andueza wrote a book on the subject, Jóvenes sin juventud ("Youths without Youth"). Having been a councillor in Ordizia and in his hometown, he was elected to the Juntas Generales of Gipuzkoa in 2011; he succeeded Denis Itxaso as the Socialist Party of the Basque Country–Basque Country Left (PSE-EE) spokesman in the legislature.

Andueza left the provincial assembly when he was elected to the Basque Parliament in the 2016 elections. In August 2020, he succeeded José Antonio Pastor as his party's spokesman in the parliament.

In October 2021, when Idoia Mendia chose not to seek another term as secretary general of the PSE-EE, Andueza, by then leader of the party in his home province, ran for the role. He took 95.3% of the vote, running against former Basauri councillor Soraya Morla. He was the first Gipuzkoan to lead the party since Ramón Jáuregui resigned in 1997.

Andueza supports bullfighting, a rare position on the Spanish left. He wrote a book Los toros, desde la izquierda ("Bullfighting, as seen from the left"), which led to insults and threats against him.
