= Amaia Martínez Grisaleña =

Spanish politician

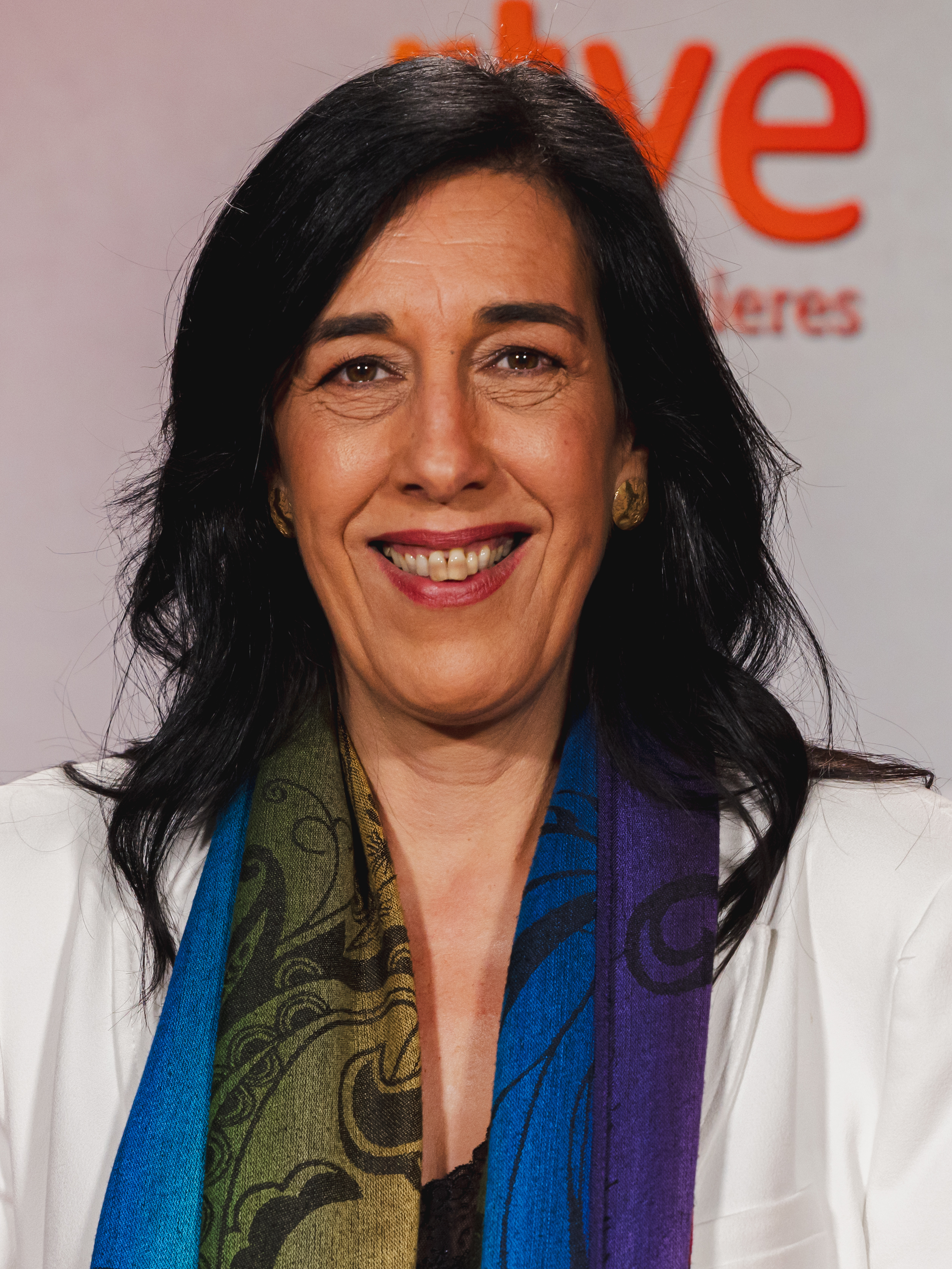
- Amaia Martínez in 2024

Member of the Basque Parliament
- Incumbent
- Assumed office 3 August 2020
- Constituency: Álava

Personal details
- Born: María Amaya Martínez Grisaleña; 6 November 1968 (age 57) Vitoria, Spain
- Party: Vox
- Education: University of the Basque Country

María Amaya Martínez Grisaleña (born 6 November 1968) is a Spanish journalist and politician who has been a member of the Basque Parliament for the Vox party since 2020.

Martínez Grisaleña studied journalism at the Universidad del País Vasco before running a company selling non-lethal weaponry with her husband. Although she is a native Basque speaker, she has spoken out against what she claims as linguistic discrimination in the Basque Country against the Spanish language.

She was elected to the Basque Parliament during the 2020 Basque regional election for Vox and is currently the only Vox representative in the Basque Parliament.
