= Socialist Party of the Basque Country–Basque Country Left =

Political party in the Basque Country

Socialist Party of the Basque Country–Basque Country Left Euskadiko Alderdi Sozialista – Euskadiko Ezkerra
- Leader: Eneko Andueza
- Founded: 26 March 1977 (PSE); 27 April 1993 (PSE–EE)
- Headquarters: C/ Alameda de Rekalde, 27, 4ª 48009, Bilbao
- Membership (2014): 5,250
- Ideology: Social democracy Basque regionalism Federalism
- Political position: Centre-left
- National affiliation: Spanish Socialist Workers' Party
- Colours: Red, White
- Basque Parliament: 10 / 75
- Congreso de los Diputados (Basque seats): 5 / 18
- Spanish Senate (Basque seats): 4 / 15
- Juntas Generales: 21 / 153
- Local seats (2015-2019): 203 / 2,628
- Mayors: 9 / 251

Website
- www.socialistasvascos.com

The Socialist Party of the Basque Country–Basque Country Left (Basque: Euskadiko Alderdi Sozialista – Euskadiko Ezkerra, Spanish: Partido Socialista de Euskadi – Euskadiko Ezkerra, PSE-EE) is a social-democratic political party in the Basque Country that acts as the regional affiliate of the Spanish Socialist Workers' Party (PSOE).

== History ==
Although local Socialist groups had been active since 1886, and many affiliated with the PSOE (Biscay being one of the strongholds of Spanish social democracy, along with Madrid and Asturias), the PSE was actually established as a branch of the main party only in 1977, during the Spanish transition to democracy, initiated by King Juan Carlos I of Spain.

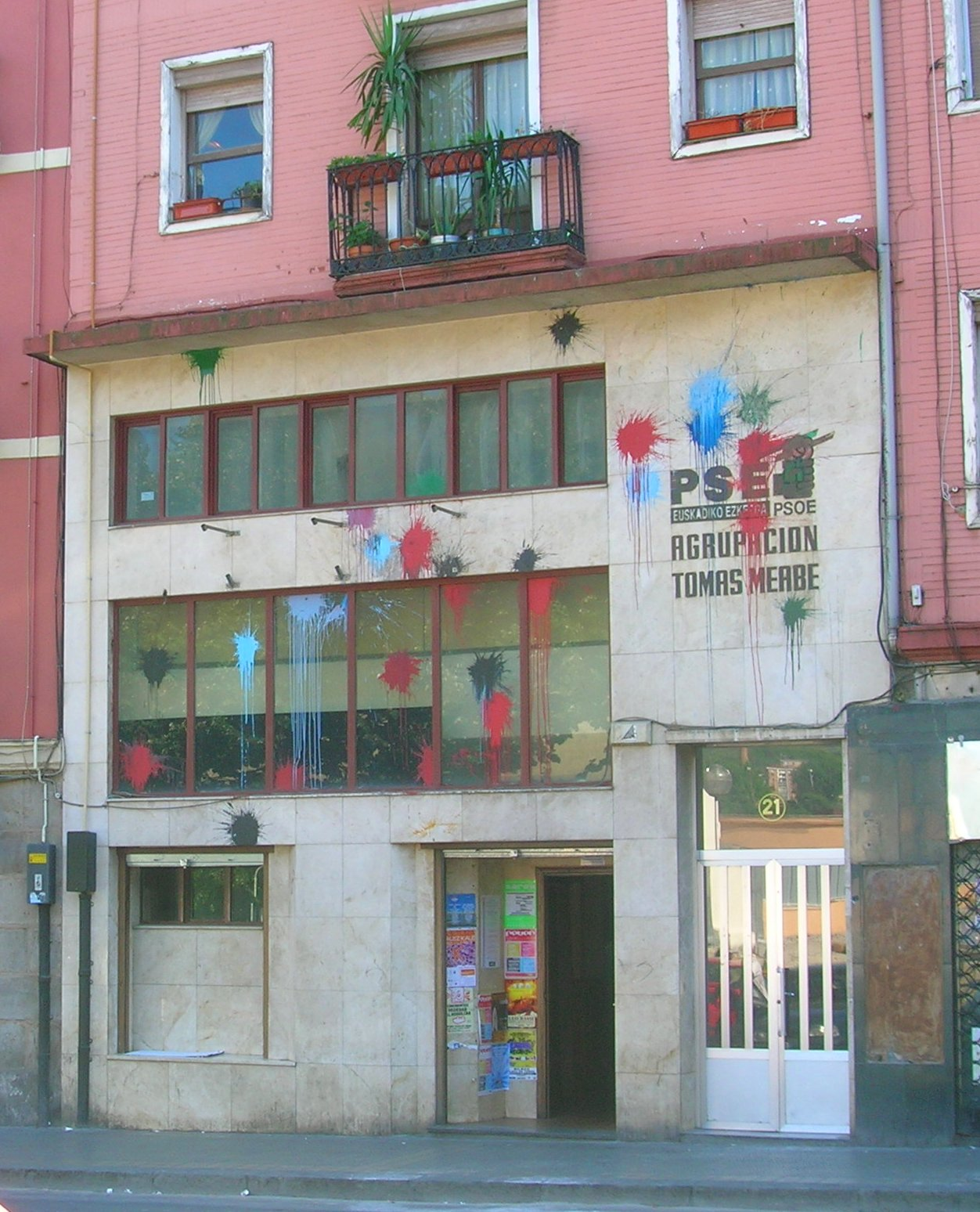
PSE-EE offices have been targeted by undercover attackers, like this one in Bilbao.

During the violent years of the 1980s in the Basque Country, mid- and high-ranking party officials held government positions in Spain and the region, as civil governors. The Basque nationalist left—Herri Batasuna and related groups—denounced during that period the collusion of the party with police abuses—especially pointing to the Guardia Civil—and in early 1984 blamed directly the Socialists for the state terrorism of the GAL death squads (1984–1987).

In the early 1990s, some of them were convicted for their participation in it. Ricardo Damborenea, head of the party in Biscay, even confessed in a press release to his involvement in the criminal pursuit in the early 1990s. All of them have been released from prison much earlier than their due term without apologising for their illegal actions; Damborenea currently gets a substantial monthly allowance from the Spanish state.

It has local associations in Gipuzkoa, Biscay, and Álava. Before June 1982, it also included a Navarre branch - which formed the Socialist Party of Navarre, PSN (PSOE).

Initially in a close alliance with the Basque Country Left (EE), a party connected with Basque nationalism, begun in 1991 with a move promoted by the respective secretaries - Ramón Jáuregui for the PSE and Mario Onaindia for the EE. It aimed to become the major Basque force in the 1993 election. The fusion of the two groups was made possible by the split of Basque Left from EE: prepared by the leadership of Nicolás Redondo Terreros (1998–2002), it was confirmed with the mandate of Patxi López in 2002.

During the 2012 elections to the parliament of the Basque Autonomous Community, the PSE-EE came up third in number of MPs (16), lagging behind the Basque Nationalist Party and EH Bildu. Throughout its recent history, it fluctuated between second and third, depending on the success of the People's Party or the Abertzale Left).

== Electoral performance ==
=== Basque Parliament ===
Basque Parliament
Election	Leading candidate	Votes	%	Seats	+/–	Government
1980	Txiki Benegas	130,221	14.16 (#3)	9 / 60	9	Opposition
1984	Txiki Benegas	247,786	22.96 (#2)	19 / 75	10	Opposition
1986	Txiki Benegas	252,233	21.95 (#1)	19 / 75	0	Coalition
1990	Ramón Jáuregui	202,736	19.79 (#2)	16 / 75	3	Opposition (1990–1991)
1990	Ramón Jáuregui	202,736	19.79 (#2)	16 / 75	3	Coalition (1991–1994)
1994	Ramón Jáuregui	174,682	16.83 (#2)	12 / 75	10 (Note: Compared to the combined totals of the Socialist Party of the Basque Country and Euskadiko Ezkerra in the 1990 regional election.)	Coalition (1994–1998)
1994	Ramón Jáuregui	174,682	16.83 (#2)	12 / 75	10	Opposition (1998)
1998	Nicolás Redondo	220,052	17.35 (#4)	14 / 75	2	Opposition
2001	Nicolás Redondo	253,195	17.76 (#3)	13 / 75	1	Opposition
2005	Patxi López	274,546	22.51 (#2)	18 / 75	5	Opposition
2009	Patxi López	318,112	30.36 (#2)	25 / 75	7	Minority
2012	Patxi López	212,809	18.89 (#3)	16 / 75	9	Opposition
2016	Idoia Mendia	126,420	11.86 (#4)	9 / 75	7	Coalition
2020	Idoia Mendia	122,248	13.52 (#3)	10 / 75	1	Coalition
2024	Eneko Andueza	150,752	14.09 (#3)	12 / 75	2	Coalition

=== Cortes Generales ===
Cortes Generales
Election	Basque Country						
Election	Congress					Senate	
Election	Votes	%	#	Seats	+/–	Seats	+/–
1977	267,897	26.48%	2nd	7 / 21	—	1 / 12	—
1979	190,235	19.05%	2nd	5 / 21	2	1 / 12	0
1982	348,620	29.16%	2nd	8 / 21	3	5 / 12	4
1986	287,918	26.29%	2nd	7 / 21	1	4 / 12	1
1989	233,650	21.11%	2nd	6 / 21	1	5 / 12	1
1993	293,442	24.52%	1st	7 / 19	1 (Note: Compared to the combined totals of the Socialist Party of the Basque Country and Euskadiko Ezkerra in the 1989 general election.)	7 / 12	2
1996	298,499	23.67%	2nd	5 / 19	2	5 / 12	2
2000	266,583	23.31%	3rd	4 / 19	1	1 / 12	4
2004	339,751	27.22%	2nd	7 / 19	3	5 / 12	4
2008	430,690	38.14%	1st	9 / 18	2	9 / 12	4
2011	255,013	21.55%	3rd	4 / 18	5	2 / 12	7
2015	161,988	13.25%	4th	3 / 18	1	0 / 12	2
2016	164,255	14.23%	3rd	3 / 18	0	0 / 12	0
2019 (Apr)	253,989	19.90%	2nd	4 / 18	1	2 / 12	2
2019 (Nov)	227,396	19.21%	2nd	4 / 18	0	2 / 12	0
2023	289,826	25.27%	1st	5 / 18	1	4 / 12	2

=== European Parliament ===
European Parliament
Election	Basque Country		
Election	Votes	%	#
1987	204,522	19.05%	3rd
1989	175,776	18.25%	3rd
1994	165,063	18.26%	2nd
1999	226,187	19.54%	3rd
2004	199,341	28.23%	2nd
2009	202,885	27.78%	2nd
2014	105,043	13.81%	3rd
2019	212,881	18.98%	3rd
2024	227,710	26.05%	2nd
