= Basque Parliament =

Legislative body of the Basque Autonomous Community of Spain

Coordinates: 42.8452°N 2.6753°W

Basque Parliament Eusko Legebiltzarra Parlamento Vasco
- 13th Basque Parliament

Type
- Type: Unicameral

Leadership
- President: Bakartxo Tejeria, EAJ/PNV since 20 November 2012
- Vice President: Susana Corcuera, PSE–EE since 14 May 2024
- Second Vice President: Eba Blanco de Angulo, EH Bildu since 21 October 2016
- Secretary: Ion Aiartza, EAJ/PNV since 14 May 2024
- Vice Secretary: Eraitz Sáez de Egilaz, EH Bildu since 14 May 2024

Structure
- Seats: 75
- Political groups: Government (39): EAJ/PNV (27); PSE–EE (12); Opposition (36): EH Bildu (27); Sortu (4); EA (4); Alternative (2); PP (7); Sumar (1); EzAn–IU (1); Vox (1)

Elections
- Voting system: Closed party lists in three 25-seat constituencies, with seats allocated using the D'Hondt method
- Last election: 21 April 2024
- Next election: On or before 21 May 2028

Meeting place
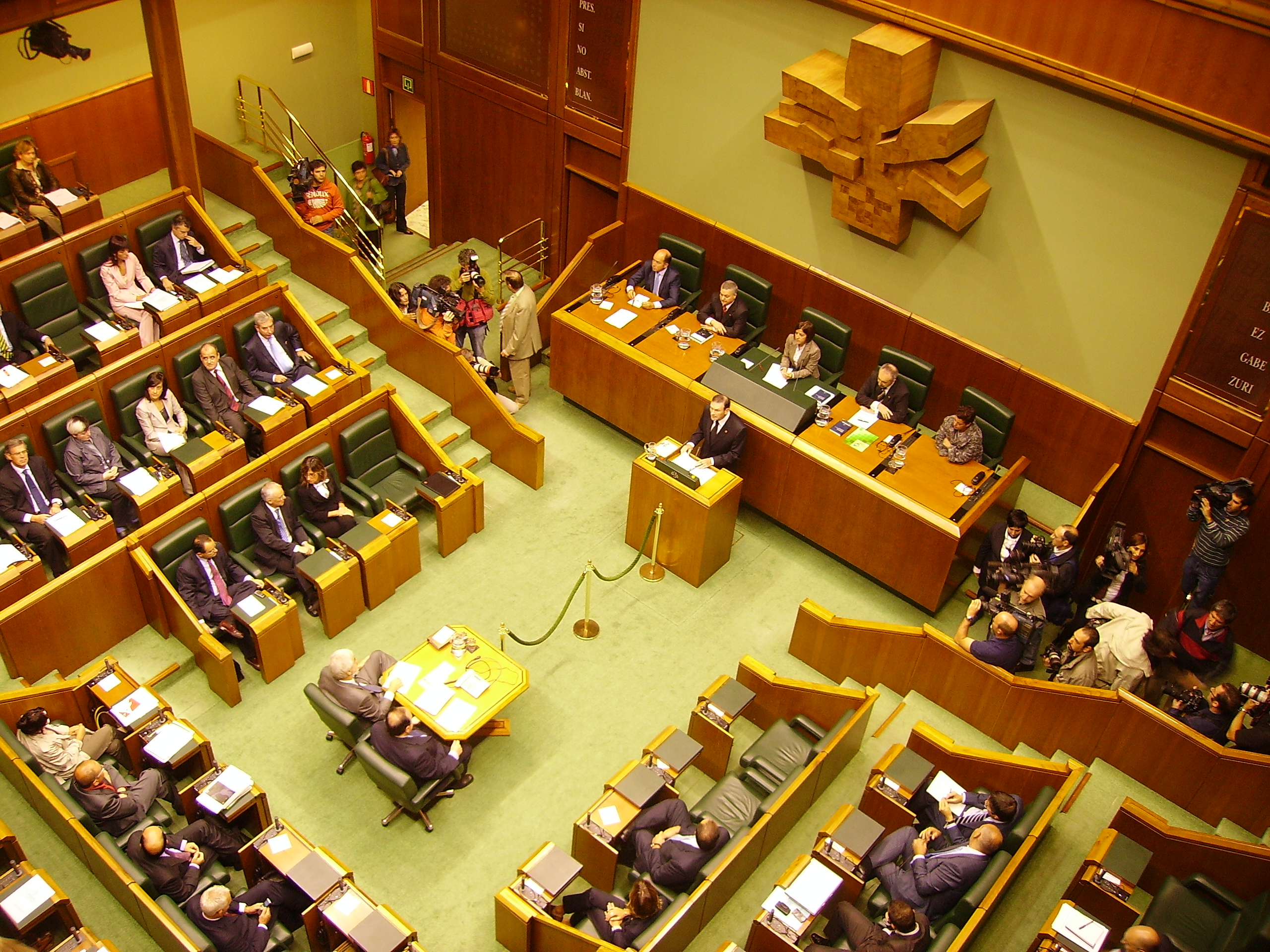
- Vitoria-Gasteiz, Álava

Website
- Website

The Basque Parliament (Basque: Eusko Legebiltzarra, Spanish: Parlamento Vasco) is the legislative body of the Basque Autonomous Community of Spain and the elected assembly to which the Basque Government is responsible.

The Parliament meets in the Basque capital, Vitoria-Gasteiz, although the first session of the modern assembly, as constituted by the Statute of Autonomy of the Basque Country, was held in Guernica – the symbolic centre of Basque freedoms – on 31 March 1980. Later in 1980 it started meeting at the premises of the Council of Álava. In 1982, it got its own site in a former high school. The symbol of the Parliament is an oaken sculpture by Nestor Basterretxea representing a stylized tree, an allusion to the tradition of Basque political assemblies meeting under a tree, as in Guernica.

It is composed of seventy-five deputies representing citizens from the three provinces of the Basque autonomous community. Each province (Álava, Gipuzkoa and Biscay) elects the same number of deputies, despite their having very different levels of population. This was chosen to earn support from Álava and Navarre, less populated territories. Still, Navarre did not join the autonomous community.

The elections are held using closed list proportional representation with seats allocated on a Provincial basis using the D'Hondt method of allocation. To qualify for seats in a particular province, electoral lists must receive at least 3% of the votes cast in that province, including votes "en blanco" for "none of the above." From 1984 to 2001, the election threshold was 5% in each province. Sessions of the Basque Parliament are conducted in both Basque and Spanish, with translation services.

The Parliament consists of 75 deputies elected by universal adult suffrage under a system of proportional representation.

== Membership ==
=== Results of the elections to the Basque Parliament ===
Deputies in the Basque Parliament since 1980
Key to parties HB PCTV/EHAK PCE/EPK EH Aralar EB–B EA EE EH Bildu (Note: From 2023.) EH Bildu (Note: Until 2023.) Elkarrekin Podemos Sumar (EzAn–IU) PSE-EE UPyD PNV–EA EAJ/PNV PP+Cs PP UCD AP–PDP–UL CDS Alavese Unity AP–PL Vox
Election	Distribution	Lehendakari
1980	11 / 1 / 6 / 9 / 25 / 6 / 2	Carlos Garaikoetxea (EAJ/PNV)
1980	11 / 1 / 6 / 9 / 25 / 6 / 2	José Antonio Ardanza (EAJ/PNV)
1984	11 / 6 / 19 / 32 / 7	José Antonio Ardanza (EAJ/PNV)
1986	13 / 9 / 19 / 13 / 17 / 2 / 2	José Antonio Ardanza (EAJ/PNV)
1990	13 / 6 / 16 / 9 / 22 / 6 / 3	José Antonio Ardanza (EAJ/PNV)
1994	11 / 6 / 12 / 8 / 22 / 11 / 5	José Antonio Ardanza (EAJ/PNV)
1998	14 / 2 / 14 / 6 / 21 / 16 / 2	Juan José Ibarretxe (EAJ/PNV)
2001	7 / 3 / 13 / 33 / 19	Juan José Ibarretxe (EAJ/PNV)
2005	9 / 1 / 3 / 18 / 29 / 15	Juan José Ibarretxe (EAJ/PNV)
2009	4 / 1 / 25 / 1 / 1 / 30 / 13	Patxi López (PSE–EE)
2012	21 / 16 / 1 / 27 / 10	Iñigo Urkullu (EAJ/PNV)
2016	18 / 11 / 9 / 28 / 9	Iñigo Urkullu (EAJ/PNV)
2020	21 / 6 / 10 / 31 / 6 / 1	Iñigo Urkullu (EAJ/PNV)
2024	27 / 1 / 12 / 27 / 7 / 1	Imanol Pradales (EAJ/PNV)

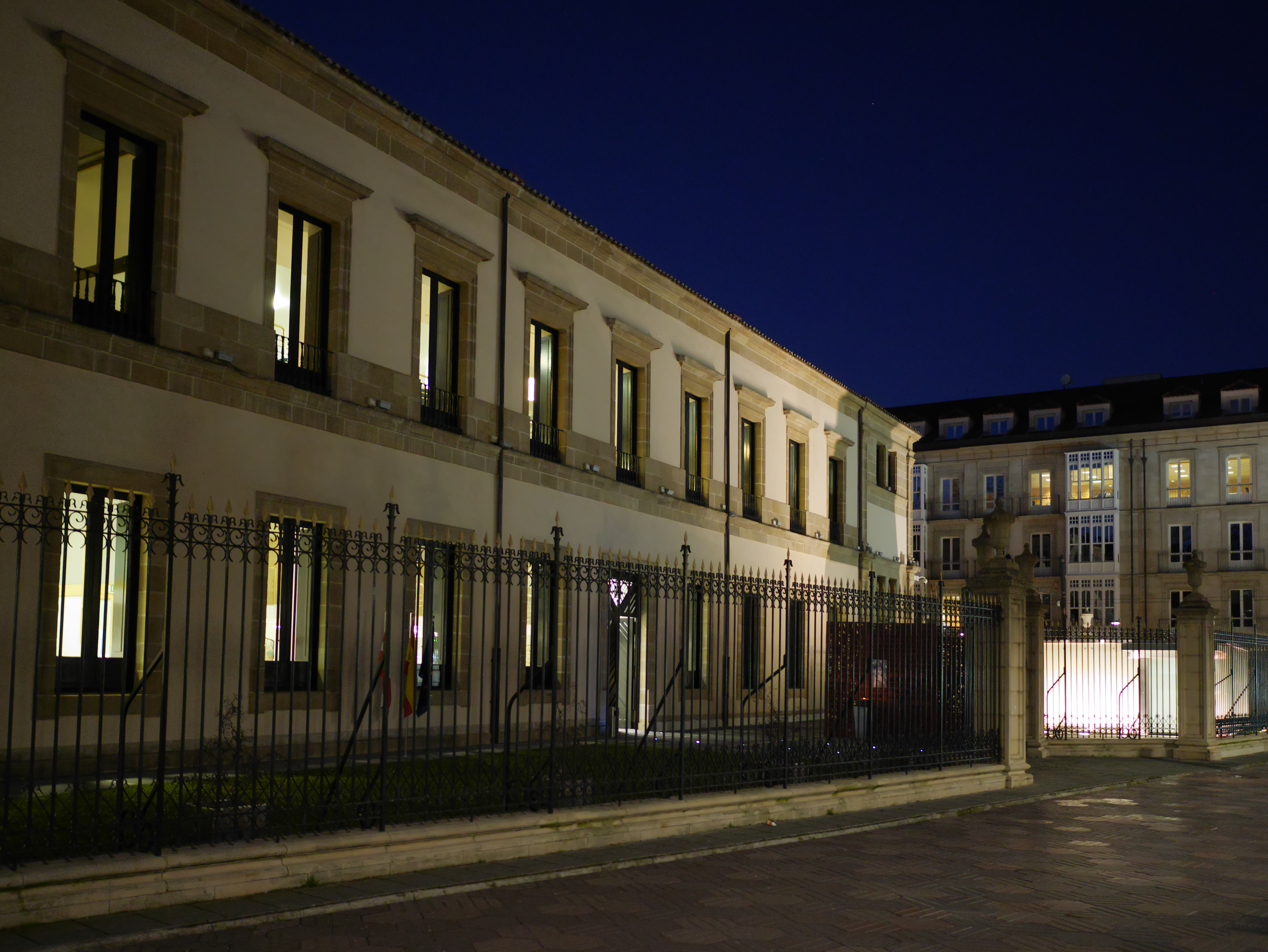
Antiguo Instituto Ramiro de Maeztu

== See also ==
- List of Basque presidents (known as Lehendakari), heads of the Basque government
- List of presidents of the Basque Parliament
