= Eider Mendoza =

Basque economist and politician (born 1974)

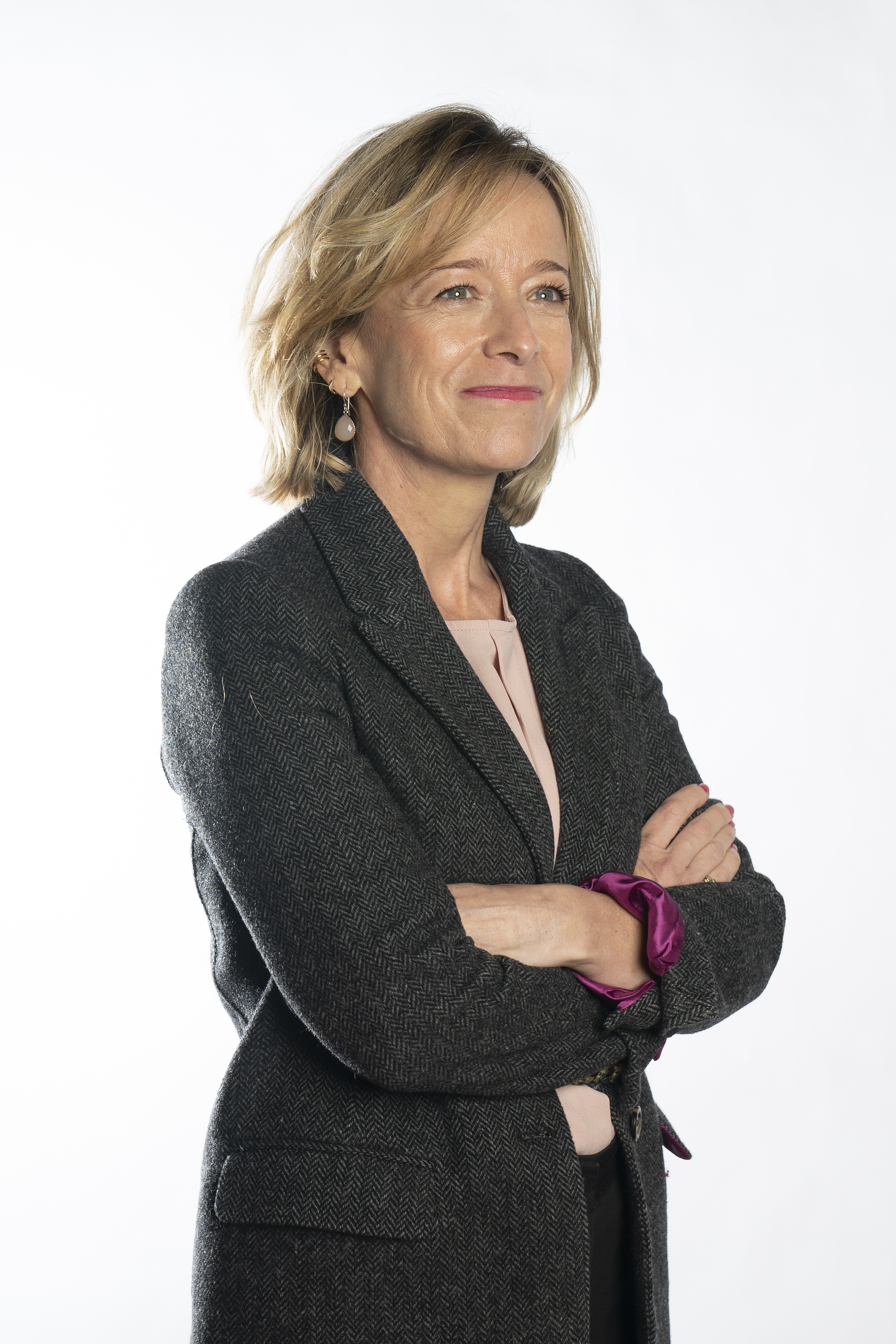
- Mendoza in 2022

President of the Gipuzkoa Provincial Council
- Incumbent
- Assumed office 29 June 2023
- Preceded by: Markel Olano

First vice president of the Gipuzkoa Provincial Council
- In office 17 November 2020 – 29 June 2023
- President: Markel Olano
- Preceded by: Imanol Lasa
- Succeeded by: Jose Ignacio Asensio

Spokesperson of the Gipuzkoa Provincial Council
- In office 1 July 2019 – 29 June 2023
- President: Markel Olano
- Preceded by: Imanol Lasa
- Succeeded by: Irune Berasaluze

Deputy of Governance of the Gipuzkoa Provincial Council
- In office 1 July 2019 – 29 June 2023
- President: Markel Olano
- Preceded by: Imanol Lasa
- Succeeded by: Irune Berasaluze

President of the General Assembly of Gipuzkoa
- In office 12 June 2015 – 2 April 2019
- Preceded by: Lohitzune Txarola
- Succeeded by: Xabier Ezeizabarrena

Member of the General Assembly of Gipuzkoa
- In office 13 June 2011 – 11 July 2019
- Succeeded by: Elixabete Murua
- Parliamentary group: Basque Nationalists
- Constituency: Bidasoa-Oiartzun

Member of the Basque Parliament for Gipuzkoa
- In office 11 October 2001 – 30 June 2011
- Preceded by: Idoia Zenarrutzabeitia
- Succeeded by: Kerman Orbegozo
- Parliamentary group: Basque Nationalists

Personal details
- Born: Eider Mendoza Larrañaga; 16 April 1974 (age 51) Azpeitia
- Party: Basque National Party
- Children: 4
- Education: Business Studies
- Alma mater: INSEEC Business School
- Occupation: Economist
- Website: Personal Twitter

Eider Mendoza Larrañaga (born 16 April 1974) is a Basque economist and politician affiliated with the Basque National Party. Since 2023, she is the president of the Gipuzkoa Provincial Council, being the first woman to hold the position. She holds a degree in Business Studies and started her political career as a member of the Basque Parliament, from 2001 to 2011. From 2011 to 2019, she was a member of the General Assembly of Gipuzkoa. She was the vice president (deputy speaker) of the Assembly during the 2011–2015 term. After the Basque National Party's election victory in 2015, she was appointed president (speaker) of the Assembly for the 2015–2019 term. Since 2019 she has been the spokesperson of the Gipuzkoa Provincial Council, and Provincial Deputy of Governance. In 2020, she was named vice-president of Gipuzkoa Provincial Council after a reshuffle by President Markel Olano. She stood for President of the Gipuzkoa Provincial Council in the 2023 foral election.

She was a member of the youth organization Euzko Gaztedi, and is currently a member of the Basque National Party's Hondarribia local branch. She has been a commentator in radio and TV shows of EITB (Mezularia, Faktoria, Debatea, Egun on Euskadi), as well as a member of the General Assembly of Kutxa and a contributor in the press.

== Early years ==
Eider Mendoza was born to a mother from Azkoitia and a father from Azpeitia. Mendoza was born in Azpeitia in 1974, and lived for four years in Etxe Alai. When she was four years old, her family moved to Hondarribia. As a child, she sang in the Eskifaia Txiki choir from Hondarribia. Her passion for politics runs in the family, and comes especially from her mother. When she was 16, Mendoza joined EGI, the youth organization of the Basque National Party.

In 1992, she began a degree in Business Studies at the European Business School in Bordeaux (France) and in 1996 she graduated specialising in International Business. While she was studying, she did internships at companies in the Basque Country, France and England. Before going into politics, she worked as a sales agent in a logistics and international transport company based in Irun, from 1997 to 2001. Since 2001, she has been on unpaid leave.

== Political career ==
=== Member of the Basque Parliament (2001–2011) ===
She contested the 2001 Basque Parliament election as a candidate for Gipuzkoa in the Basque National Party-Basque Solidarity coalition. The alliance won a landslide victory, with 45% of the vote in Gipuzkoa. Aged 26, Mendoza was elected to Parliament after various party colleagues had resigned from Parliament to serve in the Basque Government. She was a member of the Basque National Party's parliamentary group.

She was re-elected in the 2005 Basque Parliament election. She was briefly a member of the Basque Solidarity parliamentary group from 2005 to 2006, later re-joining the Basque National Party's group. She was the vice president of the Social Affairs and Employment Committee, and was one of the main promoters of the Families Support Law (2008) and the Social Services Law (2008).

She was once again re-elected in the 2009 Basque Parliament election. During her three terms in the Basque Parliament, Mendoza became a prominent member of her party. She was tasked with the coordination of the parliamentary group, and was the spokesperson of the party in social policy issues.

In June 2011, she stepped down from Parliament upon being elected to the General Assembly of Gipuzkoa.

=== Member of the General Assembly of Gipuzkoa (2011–2019) ===
Mendoza contested the 2011 Gipuzkoa foral election as the leading candidate of the Basque National Party in the Bidasoa-Oiartzun constituency. EAJ-PNV lost the control of the Gipuzkoa Provincial Council (the governing body of Gipuzkoa led by Markel Olano from 2007) after Bildu's electoral success. She was the first vice president of the General Assembly of Gipuzkoa (the legislative body) during the 2011–2015 term, as well as the spokesperson of the Social Policy Committee.

She was a leading member of her party, tasked with the coordination of the parliamentary group, as well as EAJ-PNV's spokesperson on social policy issues. Mendoza was also a usual panellist in the media, representing her party.

She was re-elected as a member of the General Assembly in the 2015 Gipuzkoa foral election. The Basque National Party was the most voted party, and Mendoza was named the president of the General Assembly for the 2015–2019 term.

=== Gipuzkoa Provincial Council (since 2019) ===
She was re-elected in the 2019 Gipuzkoa foral election, which saw EAJ-PNV increase the vote share and the number of seats. Mendoza was tipped to continue as the president of the General Assembly. However, the president of the Gipuzkoa Provincial Council, Markel Olano, incorporated her to his cabinet.

Mendoza was named Provincial Deputy of Governance, as well as the spokesperson of the Provincial Council. In November 2020, president Olano reshuffled the cabinet and appointed Mendoza first vice-president. The reshuffle raised Mendoza's profile in government, and various media outlets presented her as potential successor to Olano, who had previously said he would not run for another term in office.

In Autumn 2022, as the Basque National Party was about to begin the process to select the leading candidates for the 2023 foral elections, media speculation grew regarding Mendoza's candidacy. Finally, the party's Executive Branch of Gipuzkoa announced on 25 October that Mendoza would be proposed to the membership as the candidate to be the president of the Gipuzkoa Provincial Council.

The party membership unanimously approved her candidacy on 2 December. Mendoza is the first woman of her party to aim for the presidency of the Gipuzkoa Provincial Council.

In the 2023 foral election, the Basque National Party led by Mendoza obtained 32,04% of the vote and 17 seats in Gipuzkoa. It was the party's second best performance in vote share since the Basque Solidarity split in the 1980s (the party only achieved a higher vote share in 2019, although it secured one seat more in 2015 with a lower vote share). However, they lost 3 seats and EH Bildu was the most voted party. Nonetheless, the election devolved a hung parliament and the party announced that Mendoza would try to secure a majority in the investiture session.

=== President of the Gipuzkoa Provincial Council (since 2023) ===
On 29 June 2023, Mendoza secured a plurality of votes in the investiture session and was elected president of the Gipuzkoa Provincial Council, becoming the first woman to hold the post.

== Personal life ==
She lives in Hondarribia. She is married and has four children (a daughter and three sons). Her husband is from Saint-Jean-de-Luz. They met at university and got married in summer 1999. She is a member of Hirukide, the Basque Federation of Associations of Large Families. Mendoza is fluent in Basque, Spanish and French, and has a medium level of English.

== Electoral history ==
Electoral history of Eider Mendoza
Election	List	Constituency	List position	Result
1998 Basque Parliament election	Basque National Party (EAJ-PNV)	Gipuzkoa	3rd reserve	Not elected
1999 local elections	Basque National Party (EAJ-PNV)	Hondarribia	15th (out of 17)	Not elected
2001 Basque Parliament election	EAJ-PNV/EA	Gipuzkoa	16th (out of 25)	Not elected (Note: Following Idoia Zenarrutzabeitia's resignation, she was appointed member of parliament in October 2001.)
2003 local elections	EAJ-PNV/EA	Hondarribia	1st reserve	Not elected
2005 Basque Parliament election	EAJ-PNV/EA	Gipuzkoa	10th (out of 25)	Elected
2009 Basque Parliament election	Basque National Party (EAJ-PNV)	Gipuzkoa	5th (out of 25)	Elected (Note: She resigned in June 2011, upon being elected member of the General Assembly of Gipuzkoa.)
2011 Gipuzkoa foral election	Basque National Party (EAJ-PNV)	Bidasoa-Oiartzun	1st (out of 11)	Elected
2015 Gipuzkoa foral election	Basque National Party (EAJ-PNV)	Bidasoa-Oiartzun	1st (out of 11)	Elected
2019 Gipuzkoa foral election	Basque National Party (EAJ-PNV)	Bidasoa-Oiartzun	1st (out of 11)	Elected (Note: She resigned in July 2019, upon being appointed to the Gipuzkoa Provincial Council.)
2023 Gipuzkoa foral election	Basque National Party (EAJ-PNV)	Bidasoa-Oiartzun	1st (out of 11)	Elected
