= Opinion polling for the 2019 Spanish local elections (Basque Country) =

In the run up to the 2019 Spanish local elections, various organisations carried out opinion polling to gauge voting intention in local entities in Spain. Results of such polls for municipalities and the three foral deputations (General Assemblies) in the Basque Country are displayed in this article. The date range for these opinion polls is from the previous local elections, held on 24 May 2015, to the day the next elections were held, on 26 May 2019.

Polls are listed in reverse chronological order, showing the most recent first and using the dates when the survey fieldwork was done, as opposed to the date of publication. Where the fieldwork dates are unknown, the date of publication is given instead. The highest percentage figure in each polling survey is displayed with its background shaded in the leading party's colour. If a tie ensues, this is applied to the figures with the highest percentages. The "Lead" columns on the right shows the percentage-point difference between the parties with the highest percentages in a given poll.

== Municipalities ==
=== Barakaldo ===
Polling firm/Commissioner	Fieldwork date	Sample size	Turnout	PNV	PSE–EE (PSOE)	EH Bildu	Irabazi	PP	BD	Vox	Elkarrekin Podemos	Cs	Lead
2019 municipal election	26 May 2019	—N/a	62.5	38.6; 11	27.0; 8	11.5; 3	(Note: Within Elkarrekin Podemos.)	5.7; 1	–	1.1; 0	13.2; 4	1.5; 0	11.6
Ikerfel/El Correo	30 Apr–14 May 2019	500	?	31.6; 9/10	23.8; 7/8	12.1; 3		8.1; 2	–	0.7; 0	18.1; 5	2.0; 0	7.8
2015 municipal election	24 May 2015	—N/a	58.7	26.9; 8	26.8; 8	14.2; 4	12.0; 4	9.2; 3	4.6; 0	0.8; 0	–	–	0.1

=== Bilbao ===
Color key:

Poll conducted after legal ban on opinion polls

Polling firm/Commissioner	Fieldwork date	Sample size	Turnout	PNV	EH Bildu	PSE–EE (PSOE)	PP	UB	GB	Cs	Vox	Elkarrekin Podemos	Lead
2019 municipal election	26 May 2019	—N/a	61.8	42.7; 14	14.9; 4	15.9; 5	9.2; 3		0.5; 0	2.2; 0	1.1; 0	10.5; 3	26.8
Gizaker/EiTB	24–26 May 2019	600	?	44.2; 14/15	18.3; 6	12.3; 4	7.4; 2		3.5; 0	2.3; 0	–	9.0; 3/4	26.5
Sigma Dos/El Mundo	17 May 2019	?	?	44.0; 15	13.6; 4	17.5; 5/6	6.8; 2		–	3.2; 0	–	8.6; 2/3	26.5
Gizaker/EiTB	9–14 May 2019	400	69.0	42.5; 14	16.1; 5	14.3; 5	8.3; 2		2.1; 0	2.7; 0	1.6; 0	11.4; 3	26.4
Ikerfel/Diario Vasco	30 Apr–14 May 2019	?	?	42.1; 14	13.7; 4	13.6; 4	10.5; 3		1.2; 0	4.2; 0/1	2.3; 0	11.3; 3/4	28.4
Ikertalde/GPS	29 Apr–10 May 2019	406	60.2	42.7; 14	14.6; 4	13.2; 4	9.1; 3		–	2.5; 0	1.0; 0	13.5; 4	28.1
40dB/El País	30 Apr–2 May 2019	800	?	44.0; 14/15	14.6; 4	14.3; 4	9.4; 3			–	–	12.2; 3/4	29.4
ElectoPanel/Electomanía	31 Mar–7 Apr 2019	?	?	41.8; 14	15.6; 5	14.0; 4	8.5; 2			1.7; 0	1.6; 0	12.6; 4	26.2
ElectoPanel/Electomanía	24–31 Mar 2019	?	?	42.0; 14	15.4; 5	14.2; 4	8.2; 2			1.8; 0	1.6; 0	12.5; 4	26.6
ElectoPanel/Electomanía	17–24 Mar 2019	?	?	41.9; 14	15.4; 5	14.6; 4	8.4; 2			1.7; 0	1.7; 0	12.1; 4	26.5
ElectoPanel/Electomanía	10–17 Mar 2019	?	?	42.4; 14	15.2; 5	13.8; 4	8.6; 2			1.4; 0	2.0; 0	12.2; 4	27.2
ElectoPanel/Electomanía	3–10 Mar 2019	?	?	42.3; 14	15.3; 5	13.6; 4	8.4; 2			1.7; 0	2.0; 0	12.4; 4	27.0
ElectoPanel/Electomanía	22 Feb–3 Mar 2019	?	?	42.4; 14	15.1; 5	13.4; 4	8.6; 2			1.9; 0	1.9; 0	12.6; 4	27.3
Gizaker/City Council of Bilbao	19–21 Feb 2019	1,000	60.1	44.8; 14/15	15.3; 5	11.7; 4	7.9; 2	7.3; 2	5.7; 1/2	–	–	–	29.5
Ikertalde/GPS	29 Jan–9 Feb 2019	406	61.5	42.4; 14	13.7; 4	11.8; 4	11.0; 3			3.6; 0	0.7; 0	13.4; 4	28.7
Gizaker/EiTB	23 Nov–3 Dec 2018	400	?	44.7; 14	16.1; 5	12.5; 4	7.6; 2			4.1; 0	0.5; 0	12.9; 4	28.6
Ikertalde/GPS	25 Sep–6 Oct 2018	406	60.5	42.3; 14	13.0; 4	12.1; 4	11.8; 3			2.8; 0	–	14.0; 4	28.3
Gizaker/EiTB	14–21 May 2018	400	?	42.7; 14	15.6; 5	11.5; 4	9.9; 3	9.6; 3	4.3; 0	3.5; 0	–	–	27.1
Gizaker/EiTB	16–20 May 2017	400	?	43.8; 14	13.4; 4	12.7; 4	10.1; 3	6.4; 2	7.7; 2	2.9; 0	–	–	30.4
2015 municipal election	24 May 2015	—N/a	59.3	39.3; 13	14.0; 4	12.0; 4	11.9; 4	8.5; 2	6.5; 2	3.5; 0	0.4; 0	–	25.3

=== Donostia-San Sebastián ===
Color key:

Poll conducted after legal ban on opinion polls

Polling firm/Commissioner	Fieldwork date	Sample size	Turnout	PNV	PSE–EE (PSOE)	EH Bildu	PP	Irabazi	Cs	Vox	Elkarrekin Podemos	Lead
2019 municipal election	26 May 2019	—N/a	65.3	35.5; 10	17.5; 5	21.2; 6	10.8; 3		1.6; 0	1.3; 0	9.9; 3	14.3
Gizaker/EiTB	24–26 May 2019	600	?	37.2; 11	18.3; 5	24.3; 7	7.3; 2		2.5; 0	–	7.9; 2	12.9
Gizaker/EiTB	9–14 May 2019	400	71.5	35.1; 11	18.9; 5	23.9; 7	7.1; 2		2.7; 0	0.3; 0	9.4; 2	11.2
Ikerfel/Diario Vasco	30 Apr–14 May 2019	505	?	33.6; 10/11	19.1; 5/6	20.5; 6	8.3; 2		3.0; 0	1.8; 0	11.2; 3	13.1
Ikertalde/GPS	29 Apr–10 May 2019	406	66.5	33.3; 10	19.5; 6	20.4; 6	9.0; 2		2.8; 0	1.0; 0	11.0; 3	12.9
Ikertalde/GPS	29 Jan–9 Feb 2019	406	67.0	34.0; 10	19.6; 6	19.4; 6	8.3; 2	10.2; 3	3.5; 0	0.2; 0	–	14.4
Gizaker/EiTB	23 Nov–3 Dec 2018	400	?	35.4; 11	21.3; 6	21.3; 6	6.7; 2	8.0; 2	4.2; 0	0.4; 0	–	14.1
Ikertalde/GPS	25 Sep–6 Oct 2018	405	63.0	32.3; 10	21.0; 6	19.5; 6	8.0; 2	12.8; 3	2.2; 0	–	–	11.3
Gizaker/EiTB	14–21 May 2018	400	?	34.8; 11	21.9; 6	20.9; 6	8.5; 2	7.0; 2	4.4; 0	–	–	12.9
Gizaker/EiTB	16–20 May 2017	400	?	33.9; 10	22.2; 7	21.6; 6	8.8; 2	7.6; 2	3.3; 0	–	–	11.7
2015 municipal election	24 May 2015	—N/a	66.6	29.7; 9	24.5; 7	20.9; 6	9.5; 3	7.1; 2	3.7; 0	–	–	5.2

=== Durango ===
Polling firm/Commissioner	Fieldwork date	Sample size	Turnout	PNV	EH Bildu	Elkarrekin Podemos	PSE–EE (PSOE)	PP	Lead
2019 municipal election	26 May 2019	—N/a	68.2	35.3; 8	32.3; 7	16.3; 4	10.0; 2	4.5; 0	3.0
City Council of Durango	2 May 2019	600	?	37.9; 8	32.5; 7	13.2; 3	8.9; 2	5.3; 1	5.4
City Council of Durango	31 Jan–5 Feb 2018	400	?	? 8	? 7	? 3	? 2	? 1	?
2015 municipal election	24 May 2015	—N/a	63.2	37.0; 8	31.3; 7	13.4; 3	9.5; 2	7.0; 1	5.7

=== Eibar ===
Polling firm/Commissioner	Fieldwork date	Sample size	Turnout	PSE–EE (PSOE)	EH Bildu	PNV	Irabazi	PP	Elkarrekin Podemos	Lead
2019 municipal election	26 May 2019	—N/a	67.5	39.2; 9	24.0; 5	25.9; 6		3.5; 0	6.6; 1	13.3
Ikerfel/Diario Vasco	30 Apr–14 May 2019	504	?	39.7; 9/10	24.2; 5	25.8; 5/6		2.5; 0	6.3; 1	13.9
2015 municipal election	24 May 2015	—N/a	62.3	41.9; 10	24.0; 5	21.2; 5	6.8; 1	4.1; 0	–	17.9

=== Getxo ===
Polling firm/Commissioner	Fieldwork date	Sample size	Turnout	PNV	PP	GUK	EH Bildu	PSE–EE (PSOE)	Cs	Vox	Elkarrekin Podemos	Lead
2019 municipal election	26 May 2019	—N/a	67.5	39.1; 11	16.5; 5	2.1; 0	15.1; 4	10.6; 3	3.2; 0	1.6; 0	8.0; 2	22.6
Ikerfel/El Correo	30 Apr–14 May 2019	500	?	33.1; 9/10	17.7; 5		15.2; 4	12.3; 3	5.2; 1	4.3; 0/1	7.9; 2	7.8
2015 municipal election	24 May 2015	—N/a	63.5	34.1; 9	18.6; 5	14.5; 4	14.4; 4	7.6; 2	5.9; 1	2.0; 0	–	15.5

=== Irun ===
Polling firm/Commissioner	Fieldwork date	Sample size	Turnout	PSE–EE (PSOE)	SPI	PNV	EH Bildu	PP	Irabazi	Cs	Elkarrekin Podemos	Lead
2019 municipal election	26 May 2019	—N/a	60.8	35.7; 10		24.9; 7	13.8; 3	5.5; 1		2.3; 0	15.4; 4	10.8
Ikerfel/Diario Vasco	30 Apr–14 May 2019	501	?	32.7; 9		20.9; 6	13.8; 4	5.7; 1		3.4; 0	20.9; 6	11.8
2015 municipal election	24 May 2015	—N/a	60.5	33.4; 10	18.3; 5	18.2; 5	12.4; 3	7.8; 2	4.0; 0	3.7; 0	–	15.1

=== Vitoria-Gasteiz ===
Color key:

Poll conducted after legal ban on opinion polls

Polling firm/Commissioner	Fieldwork date	Sample size	Turnout	PP	EH Bildu	PNV	PSE–EE (PSOE)	Elkarrekin Podemos	Irabazi	Cs	Vox	Lead
2019 municipal election	26 May 2019	—N/a	63.3	18.5; 5	20.5; 6	23.6; 7	21.4; 6	9.9; 3		2.5; 0	1.4; 0	3.1
Gizaker/EiTB	24–26 May 2019	600	?	18.3; 5/6	23.9; 7/8	24.4; 7/8	14.1; 4	11.6; 3		3.1; 0	–	0.5
Gizaker/EiTB	9–14 May 2019	400	70.0	19.0; 5	23.5; 7	23.1; 7	14.3; 4	12.9; 4		3.5; 0	0.7; 0	0.4
Ikerfel/Diario Vasco	30 Apr–14 May 2019	?	?	19.5; 6	23.7; 7	21.7; 6/7	15.1; 4	12.8; 3/4		3.0; 0	2.1; 0	2.0
Ikertalde/GPS	29 Apr–10 May 2019	406	65.0	19.0; 5	22.2; 7	22.4; 7	14.7; 4	13.7; 4		3.2; 0	1.0; 0	0.2
Ikertalde/GPS	29 Jan–9 Feb 2019	406	65.5	21.1; 6	19.7; 6	21.2; 7	12.3; 4	14.5; 4		4.1; 0	1.7; 0	0.1
Gizaker/EiTB	23 Nov–3 Dec 2018	400	?	19.0; 5	19.9; 6	24.4; 7	12.6; 3	14.2; 4		6.8; 2	1.0; 0	4.5
Ikertalde/GPS	25 Sep–6 Oct 2018	532	64.0	24.5; 7	19.7; 6	21.8; 7	12.4; 3	13.5; 4		4.0; 0	–	2.7
Aztiker/Gara	28 May–20 Jun 2018	514	?	24.9; 7	20.9; 6	19.9; 6	12.6; 3	13.9; 4		5.2; 1	–	4.0
Gizaker/EiTB	14–21 May 2018	400	?	24.9; 7	19.7; 6	22.6; 7	10.1; 3	8.3; 2	5.5; 1	5.1; 1	–	2.7
Gizaker/EiTB	16–20 May 2017	400	?	25.7; 8	19.9; 6	22.5; 7	11.8; 4	8.3; 2	4.6; 0	3.7; 0	–	3.2
2015 municipal election	24 May 2015	—N/a	64.8	29.8; 9	19.5; 6	16.6; 5	11.9; 4	8.7; 2	5.1; 1	3.2; 0	0.3; 0	10.3

== General Assemblies ==
=== Álava ===
Polling firm/Commissioner	Fieldwork date	Sample size	Turnout	PP	PNV	EH Bildu	Podemos	PSE–EE (PSOE)	Irabazi	Cs	Vox	Elkarrekin Podemos	Lead
2019 foral election	26 May 2019	—N/a	65.1	15.0; 8	29.4; 17	21.0; 12		18.9; 10		2.3; 0	1.4; 0	9.9; 4	8.4
Gizaker/EiTB	9–14 May 2019	550	69.7	14.0	29.5	23.3		14.3		2.8	0.8	14.1	6.2
Ikerfel/El Correo	30 Apr–14 May 2019	?	65.1	14.2; 6/7	27.5; 15/16	19.7; 11		17.4; 10		3.3; 1	2.5; 0	13.2; 6/7	7.8
Ikertalde/GPS	29 Apr–10 May 2019	518	66.0	14.0	28.2	23.0		13.8		2.0	0.8	14.7	5.2
2019 general election	28 Apr 2019	—N/a	71.2	13.7	22.7	14.0		22.4		4.0	3.2	17.7	0.3
Gizaker/EiTB	1–5 Mar 2019	450	?	15.8	29.1	21.6		13.3		3.5	0.6	14.0	7.5
Ikertalde/GPS	29 Jan–9 Feb 2019	574	66.8	14.3	26.4	22.2		11.1		4.9	1.5	15.3	4.2
Gizaker/EiTB	23 Nov–3 Dec 2018	550	?	14.9	28.5	21.1		12.3		4.8	0.4	15.0	7.4
Ikertalde/GPS	25 Sep–6 Oct 2018	742	64.5	19.2	25.9	21.9		11.9		3.1	–	13.8	4.0
Gizaker/EiTB	14–21 May 2018	550	?	18.0	26.2	22.6		10.0	3.5	3.8	–	13.9	3.6
Gizaker/EiTB	16–20 May 2017	550	?	19.2	25.1	20.2		12.0	3.5	3.9	–	13.2	4.9
2016 regional election	25 Sep 2016	—N/a	59.7	18.5	28.0	17.8		12.9		3.2	0.5	16.1	9.5
2016 general election	26 Jun 2016	—N/a	66.5	20.4	15.9	9.5		15.7		5.0	0.2	30.9	10.5
2015 general election	20 Dec 2015	—N/a	71.1	18.8	15.8	11.8	27.0	14.1	3.8	5.9	–	–	8.2
2015 foral election	24 May 2015	—N/a	65.6	22.0; 12	21.6; 13	20.4; 11	14.6; 8	11.2; 5	3.7; 1	3.1; 1	0.1; 0	–	0.4

=== Biscay ===
Polling firm/Commissioner	Fieldwork date	Sample size	Turnout	PNV	EH Bildu	Podemos	PSE–EE (PSOE)	PP	Irabazi	Cs	Vox	Elkarrekin Podemos	Lead
2019 foral election	26 May 2019	—N/a	65.7	43.1; 25	19.7; 10		16.5; 8	6.6; 2		1.2; 0	0.9; 0	10.5; 6	23.4
Gizaker/EiTB	9–14 May 2019	600	71.0	43.9	18.5		13.9	4.9		1.5	1.2	14.4	25.4
Ikerfel/El Correo	30 Apr–14 May 2019	?	72.2	41.9; 26	18.4; 10		15.6; 7	6.4; 2		2.9; 0	1.6; 0	11.3; 6	23.5
Ikertalde/GPS	29 Apr–10 May 2019	1,036	63.0	41.8	20.2		13.0	5.8		2.0	0.5	13.5	21.6
2019 general election	28 Apr 2019	—N/a	75.8	34.4	13.4		19.9	7.2		3.1	2.3	17.7	14.5
Gizaker/EiTB	1–5 Mar 2019	650	?	45.1	20.1		13.2	6.6		1.6	0.2	11.7	25.0
Ikertalde/GPS	29 Jan–9 Feb 2019	1,106	63.5	41.8	20.1		11.8	5.9		2.5	1.0	13.1	21.7
Gizaker/Biscay Deputation	10–15 Dec 2018	1,600	62.6	43.5; 25	19.6; 11		12.2; 7	6.2; 1		2.5; 0	0.6; 0	13.6; 7	23.9
Gizaker/EiTB	23 Nov–3 Dec 2018	600	?	44.0	19.3		12.8	5.8		2.5	0.2	14.2	24.7
Ikertalde/GPS	25 Sep–6 Oct 2018	1,315	61.5	41.5	19.6		12.0	7.8		2.3	–	13.4	21.9
Ikerfel/Biscay Deputation	28 May–23 Jun 2018	3,002	62.0	40.8; 24/25	19.4; 9/10		13.0; 7/8	7.4; 3/4	1.6; 0	2.0; 0	–	13.0; 6	21.4
Gizaker/EiTB	14–21 May 2018	600	?	43.3	19.7		11.5	6.3	2.0	2.0	–	12.2	23.6
Gizaker/Biscay Deputation	27 Nov–11 Dec 2017	2,000	61.5	42.7; 25	19.7; 11		12.6; 7	7.4; 3	–	–	–	11.5; 5	23.0
Ikerfel/Biscay Deputation	15 May–8 Jun 2017	3,013	60.2	41.2; 24	18.4; 9		13.6; 8	8.5; 4	2.1; 0	1.4; 0	–	13.0; 6	22.8
Gizaker/EiTB	16–20 May 2017	600	?	42.4	18.5		12.9	7.3	2.9	1.9	–	12.9	23.9
2016 regional election	25 Sep 2016	—N/a	60.5	41.8	17.5		11.7	9.7		1.9	–	14.8	24.3
2016 general election	26 Jun 2016	—N/a	66.0	28.2	10.9		13.9	12.7		3.3	0.1	28.9	0.7
2015 general election	20 Dec 2015	—N/a	69.4	27.9	12.5	26.1	12.5	11.4	2.8	3.8	–	–	1.8
2015 foral election	24 May 2015	—N/a	62.6	37.6; 23	18.9; 11	14.5; 6	12.5; 7	8.2; 4	2.6; 0	2.1; 0	0.3; 0	–	18.7

=== Gipuzkoa ===
Polling firm/Commissioner	Fieldwork date	Sample size	Turnout	PNV	EH Bildu	PSE–EE (PSOE)	Podemos	PP	Irabazi	Cs	Elkarrekin Podemos	Vox	Lead
2019 foral election	26 May 2019	—N/a	66.6	35.6; 20	31.6; 17	17.1; 9		4.7; 1		1.0; 0	8.9; 4	–	4.0
Gizaker/EiTB	9–14 May 2019	600	71.6	36.8	32.5	14.7		3.3		1.0	11.1	0.2	4.3
Ikerfel/El Correo	30 Apr–14 May 2019	?	69.2	34.9; 20	27.7; 15	16.3; 9		4.5; 1		2.0; 0	11.9; 6	1.5; 0	6.2
Ikertalde/GPS	29 Apr–10 May 2019	588	64.7	35.0	31.7	13.5		4.7		1.3	12.0	0.3	3.3
2019 general election	28 Apr 2019	—N/a	74.0	29.1	23.4	18.8		5.0		2.9	17.3	1.6	5.7
Gizaker/Gipuzkoa Deputation	1–8 Apr 2019	1,500	64.3	35.0; 19/20	31.3; 16/18	15.2; 7/8		4.4; 1		1.2; 0	11.9; 6	0.3; 0	3.7
Gizaker/EiTB	1–5 Mar 2019	550	?	36.4	32.7	13.7		3.2		1.3	12.6	0.0	3.7
Ikertalde/GPS	29 Jan–9 Feb 2019	812	65.0	34.8	30.1	13.3		4.7		2.2	12.6	0.5	4.7
Gizaker/EiTB	23 Nov–3 Dec 2018	600	?	37.8	31.5	12.7		4.0		2.6	11.2	0.1	6.3
Gizaker/Gipuzkoa Deputation	15–21 Nov 2018	1,500	63.5	35.6; 19/20	30.9; 16/18	15.0; 8		4.1; 1		2.1; 0/1	11.7; 6	–	4.7
Ikertalde/GPS	25 Sep–6 Oct 2018	1,092	62.0	35.0	29.3	14.2		5.5		1.5	12.4	–	5.7
Gizaker/Gipuzkoa Deputation	11–15 Jun 2018	1,500	64.9	35.4; 20	30.9; 18	15.4; 7		4.3; 1	–	–	10.3; 5	–	4.5
Gizaker/EiTB	14–21 May 2018	600	?	38.8	30.7	14.0		3.5	1.5	1.2	10.2	–	8.1
Gizaker/Gipuzkoa Deputation	11–18 Oct 2017	1,500	63.1	34.1; 20	31.0; 18	15.2; 7		5.0; 1	–	–	11.2; 5	–	3.1
Gizaker/EiTB	16–20 May 2017	600	?	36.0	29.0	15.6		4.7	2.2	0.9	11.3	–	7.0
Gizaker/Gipuzkoa Deputation	10–13 May 2017	1,500	62.3	36.4; 20/21	29.8; 17	15.2; 8/9		4.6; 1	–	–	10.8; 4	–	6.6
2016 regional election	25 Sep 2016	—N/a	59.4	34.1	28.7	11.8		7.2		1.7	14.2	–	5.4
2016 general election	26 Jun 2016	—N/a	63.3	23.3	19.1	14.1		9.7		3.2	28.6	–	5.3
2015 general election	20 Dec 2015	—N/a	67.4	23.5	20.9	13.3	25.3	8.7	2.8	3.8	–	–	1.8
2015 foral election	24 May 2015	—N/a	64.9	31.6; 18	28.8; 17	16.5; 9	12.1; 6	5.4; 1	2.4; 0	1.5; 0	–	–	2.8
