= Olano =

Olano or Olaño may refer to:

== People ==
- Abraham Olano (born 1970), Spanish cyclist
- Antonio Ros de Olano, 1st Marquess of Guad-el-Jelú (1808–1886), Venezuelan-born Spanish writer, politician and military officer
- Arrel Olaño (born 1943), Filipino politician
- Francisco José Urrutia Olano (1870–1950), Colombian diplomat and international jurist
- Markel Olano (born 1965), Basque politician
- Mikel Alonso Olano (born 1980), Spanish footballer
- Patricia Olano (born 1950), Colombian swimmer
- Pedro Ignacio Wolcan Olano (born 1953), Uruguayan bishop
- Xabier Alonso Olano (born 1981), Spanish footballer
- Mutya Orquia (born Ruelleen Angel Orquia Olano; 2006), Filipino actress

== Other ==
- Germán Olano Airport, an airport in Puerto Carreño, Vichada Department, Colombia
- Ordinary People and Independent Personalities (formerly OĽaNO), a Slovak political party
- United States v. Olano, a U.S. Supreme Court decision
