= Sub-national opinion polling for the 2023 Spanish general election =

In the run up to the 2023 Spanish general election, various organisations carried out opinion polling to gauge voting intention in autonomous communities and constituencies in Spain during the term of the 14th Cortes Generales. Results of such polls are displayed in this article. The date range for these opinion polls is from the previous general election, held on 10 November 2019, to the day the next election was held, on 23 July 2023.

Voting intention estimates refer mainly to a hypothetical Congress of Deputies election. Polls are listed in reverse chronological order, showing the most recent first and using the dates when the survey fieldwork was done, as opposed to the date of publication. Where the fieldwork dates are unknown, the date of publication is given instead. The highest percentage figure in each polling survey is displayed with its background shaded in the leading party's colour. If a tie ensues, this is applied to the figures with the highest percentages. The "Lead" columns on the right shows the percentage-point difference between the parties with the highest percentages in a given poll.

Refusals are generally excluded from the party vote percentages, while question wording and the treatment of "don't know" responses and those not intending to vote may vary between polling organisations. When available, seat projections are displayed below the percentages in a smaller font.

== Autonomous communities ==
=== Andalusia ===
Polling firm/Commissioner	Fieldwork date	Sample size	Turnout	PSOE	PP	Vox	Unidas Podemos	CS	Más País	Adelante Andalucía (2021)	Sumar	Lead
2023 general election	23 Jul 2023	—N/a	66.6	33.5; 21	36.4; 25	15.3; 9	(Note: Within Sumar.)	–		0.2; 0	12.0; 6	2.9
Sigma Dos/El Mundo	3–8 Jul 2023	?	?	? 22	? 24	? 11		–		–	? 4	?
Sondaxe/La Voz de Galicia	3–7 Jul 2023	?	?	? 20	? 24	? 11		–		–	? 6	?
GAD3/ABC	29 Jun–7 Jul 2023	?	?	? 21/23	? 29/31	? 6		–		–	? 3	?
CIS	8–27 Jun 2023	5,016	?	? 18/20	? 27/28	? 5/7		–		–	? 8	?
2022 regional election	19 Jun 2022	—N/a	55.9	24.1 (18)	43.1 (34)	13.5 (6)	7.7 (2)	3.3 (0)	(Note: Within Unidas Podemos.)	4.6 (1)	–	19.0
Ágora Integral/Canarias Ahora	5–9 May 2022	500	?	28.9; 22	25.6; 19	22.9; 14	13.9; 6	3.6; 0	2.2; 0	–	–	3.3
November 2019 general election	10 Nov 2019	—N/a	65.9	33.4; 25	20.5; 15	20.4; 12	13.1; 6	8.1; 3	1.3; 0	–	–	12.9

=== Aragon ===
Polling firm/Commissioner	Fieldwork date	Sample size	Turnout	PSOE	PP	Vox	Unidas Podemos	CS	Mas País–CHA–Equo	Existe	Podemos	IU	Sumar	Lead
2023 general election	23 Jul 2023	—N/a	70.7	31.1; 4	36.3; 7	14.6; 1		–		2.9; 0			12.3; 1	5.2
Sigma Dos/El Mundo	3–8 Jul 2023	?	?	? 4	? 6	? 1		–		? 1			? 1	?
Sondaxe/La Voz de Galicia	3–7 Jul 2023	?	?	? 4	? 6	? 1		–		? 1			? 1	?
GAD3/ABC	29 Jun–7 Jul 2023	?	?	? 4	? 7	? 1		–		? 0			? 1	?
CIS	8–27 Jun 2023	1,257	?	? 4/5	? 5/7	? 0/1		–		? 0/1			? 1/2	?
2023 regional election	28 May 2023	—N/a	66.5	29.6 (5)	35.5 (6)	11.2 (1)	–	1.3 (0)	5.1 (0)	5.0 (1)	4.0 (0)	3.1 (0)	–	5.9
November 2019 general election	10 Nov 2019	—N/a	69.3	30.7; 6	23.9; 4	17.0; 1	10.8; 1	8.6; 0	3.3; 0	2.8; 1			–	6.8

=== Asturias ===
Polling firm/Commissioner	Fieldwork date	Sample size	Turnout	PSOE	PP	Unidas Podemos	Vox	CS	Podemos	IU	Sumar	Lead
2023 general election	23 Jul 2023	—N/a	62.9	34.3; 2	35.6; 3		12.5; 1	–			14.8; 1	1.3
Sigma Dos/El Mundo	3–8 Jul 2023	?	?	? 2	? 3		? 1	–			? 1	?
Sondaxe/La Voz de Galicia	3–7 Jul 2023	?	?	? 2	? 3		? 1	–			? 1	?
GAD3/ABC	29 Jun–7 Jul 2023	?	?	? 2	? 3		? 1	–			? 1	?
CIS	8–27 Jun 2023	616	?	? 2/3	? 2/3		? 1	–			? 1/2	Tie
2023 regional election	28 May 2023	—N/a	56.8	36.5 (3)	32.6 (3)	–	10.1 (1)	0.9 (0)	3.9 (0)	7.6 (0)	–	3.9
SyM Consulting	27–31 Dec 2020	1,276	64.7	30.3; 2/3	23.9; 2	13.9; 1	20.5; 1/2	6.5; 0			–	6.4
November 2019 general election	10 Nov 2019	—N/a	58.1	33.3; 3	23.2; 2	16.0; 1	15.9; 1	6.7; 0			–	10.1

=== Balearic Islands ===
Polling firm/Commissioner	Fieldwork date	Sample size	Turnout	PSOE	PP	Unidas Podemos	Vox	CS	Ara Més	Más País	Sumar	Lead
2023 general election	23 Jul 2023	—N/a	61.3	30.2; 3	35.6; 3		15.2; 1	–			16.6; 1	5.4
IBES/Última Hora	10–14 Jul 2023	800	?	27.3; 2/3	38.1; 3/4		15.9; 1	–			14.8; 1	10.8
Sigma Dos/El Mundo	3–8 Jul 2023	?	?	? 2	? 4		? 1	–			? 1	?
Sondaxe/La Voz de Galicia	3–7 Jul 2023	?	?	? 2	? 3		? 1	–			? 2	?
GAD3/ABC	29 Jun–7 Jul 2023	?	?	? 2	? 4		? 1	–			? 1	?
CIS	8–27 Jun 2023	619	?	? 2/3	? 2/3		? 1	–			? 2	Tie
NC Report/Mallorca Diario	10–15 Jun 2023	800	?	27.4; 2	38.9; 4		15.6; 1	–			15.1; 1	11.5
2023 regional election	28 May 2023	—N/a	55.1	26.5 (2)	35.8 (4)	4.4 (0)	13.9 (1)	1.4 (0)	10.1 (1)	–	–	9.3
PP	18 May 2020	?	?	23.0– 25.0	27.0– 28.0	15.0– 17.0	15.0– 17.0	–	–	1.0– 2.0	–	3.0– 4.0
November 2019 general election	10 Nov 2019	—N/a	56.8	25.4; 2	22.8; 2	18.1; 2	17.1; 2	7.4; 0	4.0 (Note: Result for More Left.); 0	2.3; 0	–	2.6

=== Basque Country ===
Polling firm/Commissioner	Fieldwork date	Sample size	Turnout	PNV	PSE–EE (PSOE)	EH Bildu	Elkarrekin Podemos	PP	Vox	CS	Sumar	Lead
2023 general election	23 Jul 2023	—N/a	65.1	24.0; 5	25.3; 5	23.9; 5		11.6; 2	2.6; 0	–	11.1; 1	1.3
Gizaker/EITB	28 Jun–11 Jul 2023	2,400	60.9	28.0; 5	23.1; 5	24.7; 5		10.3; 2	1.9; 0	–	10.6; 1	3.3
Sigma Dos/El Mundo	3–8 Jul 2023	?	?	? 6	? 4	? 4		? 2	? 0	–	? 2	?
Sondaxe/La Voz de Galicia	3–7 Jul 2023	?	?	? 5	? 4	? 5		? 2	? 0	–	? 2	Tie
GAD3/ABC	29 Jun–7 Jul 2023	?	?	? 5	? 4	? 5		? 2	? 0	–	? 2	Tie
CIS	8–27 Jun 2023	1,496	?	? 3/5	? 4/7	? 3/6		? 2	? 0	–	? 3	?
Ikerfel/GPS	20–23 Jun 2023	1,453	60.7	25.9; 5	23.1; 5	25.3; 5		10.9; 2	3.1; 0	–	9.2; 1	0.6
2023 foral elections	28 May 2023	—N/a	60.0	34.5 (7)	16.2 (3)	28.8 (7)	7.0 (0)	8.9 (1)	1.5 (0)	–	–	5.7
November 2019 general election	10 Nov 2019	—N/a	66.4	32.0; 6	19.2; 4	18.7; 4	15.4; 3	8.8; 1	2.4; 0	1.1; 0	–	12.8

=== Canary Islands ===
Color key:

Poll conducted after legal ban on opinion polls

Polling firm/Commissioner	Fieldwork date	Sample size	Turnout	PSOE	PP	Unidas Podemos	CC–NCa	Vox	CS	Más País	CCa	NCa	Sumar	Lead
2023 general election	23 Jul 2023	—N/a	58.2	33.3; 6	30.4; 6		–	7.6; 1	–		11.4; 1	4.5; 0	10.5; 1	2.9
Ágora Integral/Canarias Ahora	18–22 Jul 2023	?	?	? 4/5	? 6		–	? 1	–		? 1/2	? 0/1	? 1/2	?
Ágora Integral/Canarias Ahora	11–15 Jul 2023	1,425	?	28.1; 4/5	33.4; 6		–	6.4; 1	–		12.5; 1	5.1; 0/1	11.3; 2	5.3
Perfiles/La Provincia	12–14 Jul 2023	1,420	?	? 4/5	? 4/6		–	? 1/2	–		? 1/3	? 0	? 0/2	?
Sigma Dos/El Mundo	3–8 Jul 2023	?	?	? 4	? 7		–	? 1	–		? 1	? 0	? 2	?
Sondaxe/La Voz de Galicia	3–7 Jul 2023	?	?	? 5	? 5		–	? 2	–		? 1	? 0	? 2	Tie
GAD3/ABC	29 Jun–7 Jul 2023	?	?	? 6	? 6		–	? 1	–		? 0	? 0	? 2	Tie
CIS	8–27 Jun 2023	1,093	?	? 6/7	? 4/5		–	? 0/2	–		? 0/1	? 0	? 2	?
2023 regional election	28 May 2023	—N/a	52.0	27.2 (5)	19.3 (4)	3.9 (0)	–	7.9 (1)	0.4 (0)	0.2 (0)	22.1 (4)	7.9 (1)	–	5.1
Ágora Integral/Canarias Ahora	5–9 May 2022	400	?	24.9; 4	25.4; 5	14.0; 2	13.0; 2	16.8; 2	1.2; 0	1.8; 0	(Note: Within CC–NC.)		–	0.5
Ágora Integral/Canarias Ahora	23–27 Sep 2021	1,000	53.2	28.6; 5	25.4; 5	14.1; 2	11.5; 1	13.4; 2	–	–			–	3.2
November 2019 general election	10 Nov 2019	—N/a	55.4	28.9; 5	20.8; 4	14.7; 2	13.1; 2	12.5; 2	5.4; 0	1.6; 0			–	9.1

=== Cantabria ===
Polling firm/Commissioner	Fieldwork date	Sample size	Turnout	PP	PSOE	PRC	Vox	Unidas Podemos	CS	Sumar	Lead
2023 general election	23 Jul 2023	—N/a	69.9	42.1; 2	33.3; 2	–	14.1; 1		–	8.5; 0	8.8
Sigma Dos/El Mundo	3–8 Jul 2023	?	?	? 3	? 1	–	? 1	–		? 0	?
Sondaxe/La Voz de Galicia	3–7 Jul 2023	?	?	? 3	? 2	–	? 0	–		? 0	?
GAD3/ABC	29 Jun–7 Jul 2023	?	?	? 2/3	? 2	–	? 0/1	–		? 0	?
CIS	8–27 Jun 2023	430	?	? 2	? 2	–	? 0/1	–		? 0/1	Tie
2023 regional election	28 May 2023	—N/a	65.3	35.8 (3)	20.6 (1)	20.8 (1)	11.1 (0)	4.1 (0)	2.3 (0)	–	15.0
November 2019 general election	10 Nov 2019	—N/a	65.7	25.9; 2	23.2; 1	21.0; 1	14.9; 1	8.7; 0	4.8; 0	–	2.7

=== Castile and León ===
Polling firm/Commissioner	Fieldwork date	Sample size	Turnout	PP	PSOE	Vox	Unidas Podemos	CS	UPL	SY	Sumar	Lead
2023 general election	23 Jul 2023	—N/a	69.4	41.5; 18	32.3; 12	13.8; 1		–	1.6; 0	0.7; 0	7.0; 0	9.2
Sigma Dos/El Mundo	3–8 Jul 2023	?	?	? 20	? 11	? 0		–	? 0	? 0	? 0	?
Sondaxe/La Voz de Galicia	3–7 Jul 2023	?	?	? 17	? 10	? 4		–	? 0	? 0	? 0	?
GAD3/ABC	29 Jun–7 Jul 2023	?	?	? 18	? 12	? 1		–	? 0	? 0	? 0	?
CIS	8–27 Jun 2023	3,387	?	? 14/17	? 13/15	? 0		–	? 0	? 0	? 1/2	?
2022 regional election	13 Feb 2022	—N/a	58.8	31.4 (11)	30.0 (10)	17.6 (8)	5.1 (0)	4.5 (0)	4.3 (1)	1.6 (1)	–	1.4
Sigma Dos/RTVCyL	29 Nov–21 Dec 2021	4,000	?	34.6	32.4	14.5	8.9	3.6	–	–	–	2.2
Sigma Dos/RTVCyL	11–15 Jun 2021	1,200	?	42.2	29.1	13.9	7.3	3.4	–	–	–	13.1
GAD3/El Norte de Castilla	22–31 May 2021	1,000	?	43.9; 20	31.3; 10	14.9; 1	–	–	–	–	–	12.6
Sigma Dos/RTVCyL	2–9 Dec 2020	3,300	?	36.2	30.6	15.4	7.3	6.8	–	–	–	5.6
Sigma Dos/RTVCyL	14–19 May 2020	1,200	?	34.8	32.1	11.7	9.2	7.3	–	–	–	2.7
November 2019 general election	10 Nov 2019	—N/a	66.6	31.6; 13	31.3; 12	16.6; 6	9.3; 0	7.6; 0	0.7; 0	–	–	0.3

=== Castilla–La Mancha ===
Polling firm/Commissioner	Fieldwork date	Sample size	Turnout	PSOE	PP	Vox	Unidas Podemos	CS	Sumar	Lead
2023 general election	23 Jul 2023	—N/a	73.0	34.2; 8	38.9; 10	17.8; 3		–	7.4; 0	4.7
Sigma Dos/El Mundo	3–8 Jul 2023	?	?	? 7	? 11	? 3		–	? 0	?
Sondaxe/La Voz de Galicia	3–7 Jul 2023	?	?	? 7	? 8	? 6		–	? 0	?
GAD3/ABC	29 Jun–7 Jul 2023	?	?	? 7	? 11/12	? 2/3		–	? 0	?
CIS	8–27 Jun 2023	3,387	?	? 8	? 11	? 2		–	? 0	?
2023 regional election	28 May 2023	—N/a	69.6	45.0 (12)	33.7 (8)	12.8 (1)	4.2 (0)	1.0 (0)	–	11.3
November 2019 general election	10 Nov 2019	—N/a	70.1	33.1; 9	26.9; 7	21.9; 5	9.2; 0	6.8; 0	–	6.2

=== Catalonia ===
Color key:

Poll conducted after legal ban on opinion polls

Polling firm/Commissioner	Fieldwork date	Sample size	Turnout	ERC	PSC	ECP	JxCat	PP	CUP	Vox	CS	Más País	Junts	PDeCAT	Sumar	Lead
2023 general election	23 Jul 2023	—N/a	62.7	13.2; 7	34.5; 19		–	13.3; 6	2.8; 0	7.8; 2	–		11.2; 7	0.9; 0	14.0; 7	20.5
Sigma Dos/CCMA	6–22 Jul 2023	?	?	18.7; 9	22.7; 13		–	16.8; 8/9	4.7; 1	6.7; 1/2	–		15.9; 9	–	13.6; 6	4.0
Sigma Dos/El Mundo	3–8 Jul 2023	?	?	? 8	? 13		–	? 8	? 2	? 2	–		? 9	–	? 6	?
Sondaxe/La Voz de Galicia	3–7 Jul 2023	?	?	? 9	? 13		–	? 5	? 0	? 3	–		? 9	–	? 9	?
GAD3/ABC	29 Jun–7 Jul 2023	?	?	? 9	? 13		–	? 7	? 1	? 3	–		? 8	–	? 7	?
Opinòmetre/Ara	27 Jun–4 Jul 2023	502	?	16.1; 9/11	27.8; 14/16		–	13.3; 5/7	5.5; 1/2	7.9; 2/3	–		13.9; 7/9	–	13.4; 6/8	11.7
CIS	8–27 Jun 2023	3,380	?	? 5/7	? 18/22		–	? 6/8	? 0/1	? 2/3	–		? 3/6	–	? 7/9	?
GESOP/CEO	29 May–26 Jun 2023	2,000	?	15.0– 18.0; 8/10	29.0– 33.0; 16/18		–	12.0– 16.0; 6/8	4.0– 6.0; 0/2	6.0– 8.0; 2/3	–		12.0– 15.0; 7/9	–	7.0– 10.0; 2/4	14.0– 15.0
GESOP/CEO	27 Feb–24 Mar 2023	2,000	?	19.0– 23.0; 11/15	23.0– 27.0; 12/15	12.0– 15.0; 4/8	–	8.0– 10.0; 2/5	6.0– 8.0; 1/4	6.0– 9.0; 1/4	2.0– 4.0; 0/1	–	9.0– 12.0; 5/7	–	–	4.0
Metroscopia/Periodismo 2030	29 Nov–19 Dec 2022	823	?	? 12/13	? 11	? 6/8	? 8	? 5	? 2/3	? 2/3	? 0	–	–	–	–	?
GESOP/CEO	27 Sep–21 Oct 2022	2,000	?	16.0– 20.0; 10/13	22.0– 25.0; 12/15	11.0– 13.0; 4/6	–	11.0– 14.0; 4/7	6.0– 8.0; 1/3	6.0– 8.0; 2/3	2.0– 4.0; 0/1	–	10.0– 13.0; 6/8	–	–	5.0– 6.0
GESOP/CEO	7 Jun–7 Jul 2022	2,000	?	18.0– 22.0; 11/14	23.0– 27.0; 13/15	10.0– 13.0; 4/6	–	9.0– 12.0; 2/6	6.0– 8.0; 2/4	5.0– 7.0; 1/3	3.0– 5.0; 0/2	–	10.0– 13.0; 6/8	–	–	5.0
Ágora Integral/Canarias Ahora	5–9 May 2022	500	?	24.1; 13	19.4; 11	14.1; 7	–	8.7; 4	6.5; 2	7.1; 3	4.1; 0	1.2; 0	13.2; 8	–	–	4.7
GESOP/CEO	1–28 Mar 2022	2,000	?	20.0– 24.0; 13/15	22.0– 27.0; 12/15	11.0– 15.0; 4/6	–	6.0– 10.0; 2/3	6.0– 9.0; 2/4	6.0– 11.0; 2/4	1.0– 3.0; 0/1	–	10.0– 14.0; 6/9	–	–	2.0– 3.0
GAD3/La Vanguardia	20–22 Sep 2021	806	?	22.6; 13/14	21.9; 11/12	13.5; 7	–	9.6; 3/4	5.6; 2	7.0; 2	3.2; 0/1	–	12.7; 8	–	–	0.7
Opinòmetre/CEO	11–19 May 2021	1,200	68	22.3; 13/14	21.8; 11/13	10.9; 4	–	9.8; 3/4	7.7; 3/4	8.1; 3/4	2.1; 0	–	14.2; 8	–	–	0.5
2021 regional election	14 Feb 2021	—N/a	51.3	21.3 (12)	23.0 (13)	6.9 (2)	–	3.8 (1)	6.7 (2)	7.7 (3)	5.6 (2)	–	20.1 (13)	2.7 (0)	–	1.7
GESOP/CEO	13 Oct–7 Nov 2020	2,000	68	23.9; 15	21.7; 12/13	12.5; 6	–	8.4; 3	5.3; 1/2	6.7; 2	4.6; 1	–	12.2; 7/8	1.5; 0	–	2.2
GESOP/CEO	29 Sep–9 Oct 2020	1,500	68	22.7; 14/15	21.9; 12	12.9; 6/7	13.7; 9	8.0; 3	4.7; 1	7.1; 2	4.7; 1	–	–	–	–	0.8
GESOP/CEO	25 Jun–21 Jul 2020	2,000	68	22.1; 13	21.5; 12	14.3; 7	13.4; 8	7.8; 2/3	5.9; 2	6.6; 2	5.0; 1/2	–	–	–	–	0.6
GESOP/CEO	10 Feb–9 Mar 2020	2,000	68	22.9; 13/14	21.7; 12	14.6; 7	12.7; 7/8	8.6; 3	5.8; 2	6.8; 2	3.3; 1	–	–	–	–	1.2
GESOP/CEO	14 Nov–5 Dec 2019	1,500	68	23.2; 14	19.6; 11	14.3; 6/7	13.8; 8	8.1; 3	7.2; 2/3	6.8; 2	3.7; 1	–	–	–	–	3.6
November 2019 general election	10 Nov 2019	—N/a	69.4	22.6; 13	20.5; 12	14.2; 7	13.7; 8	7.4; 2	6.4; 2	6.3; 2	5.6; 2	1.1; 0	–	–	–	2.1

=== Extremadura ===
Polling firm/Commissioner	Fieldwork date	Sample size	Turnout	PSOE	PP	Vox	Unidas Podemos	CS	Sumar	Lead
2023 general election	23 Jul 2023	—N/a	71.7	39.1; 4	37.9; 4	13.6; 1		–	6.9; 0	1.2
Sigma Dos/El Mundo	3–8 Jul 2023	?	?	? 4	? 4	? 1		–	? 0	Tie
Sondaxe/La Voz de Galicia	3–7 Jul 2023	?	?	? 4	? 4	? 1		–	? 0	Tie
GAD3/ABC	29 Jun–7 Jul 2023	?	?	? 4	? 5	? 0		–	? 0	?
CIS	8–27 Jun 2023	987	?	? 4	? 5	? 0		–	? 0	?
2023 regional election	28 May 2023	—N/a	70.4	39.9 (5)	38.8 (4)	8.1 (0)	6.0 (0)	0.9 (0)	–	1.1
GAD3/PP	26–31 Oct 2022	802	?	34.9; 4	40.7; 5	13.5; 1	6.0; 0	2.0; 0	–	5.8
November 2019 general election	10 Nov 2019	—N/a	67.2	38.3; 5	26.0; 3	16.8; 2	9.1; 0	7.6; 0	–	12.3

=== Galicia ===
Color key:

Poll conducted after legal ban on opinion polls

Polling firm/Commissioner	Fieldwork date	Sample size	Turnout	PP	PSdeG–PSOE	EC	BNG	Vox	CS	Sumar	Lead
2023 general election	23 Jul 2023	—N/a	61.4	43.6; 13	29.8; 7		9.4; 1	4.9; 0	–	10.9; 2	13.8
Sondaxe/La Voz de Galicia	18–22 Jul 2023	?	?	? 12	? 7		? 2	–	–	? 2	?
Sigma Dos/El Mundo	3–8 Jul 2023	?	?	? 14	? 7		? 0	–	–	? 2	?
Sondaxe/La Voz de Galicia	3–7 Jul 2023	?	?	39.1; 13	30.7; 7		10.9; 2	–	–	10.7; 1	8.4
GAD3/ABC	29 Jun–7 Jul 2023	?	?	? 12/13	? 8/9		? 1	–	–	? 1	?
CIS	8–27 Jun 2023	2,181	?	? 8/12	? 7/10		? 2/3	–	–	? 2	?
Sondaxe/La Voz de Galicia	13–21 Jun 2023	1,223	?	40.2; 13	26.0; 6		10.5; 2	–	–	13.2; 2	14.2
Sondaxe/La Voz de Galicia	6–19 Oct 2022	1,223	62.0	37.4; 11	25.5; 9	7.5; 1	11.2; 2	–	–	5.7; 0	11.9
Sondaxe/La Voz de Galicia	16–24 May 2022	1,000	?	37.6; 11	26.9; 8	10.0; 2	12.4; 2	6.4; 0	2.0; 0	–	10.7
Sondaxe/La Voz de Galicia	14–21 Oct 2021	1,223	?	33.9; 10	28.1; 9	10.8; 2	12.4; 2	–	–	–	5.8
Sondaxe/La Voz de Galicia	16–23 Jun 2021	1,223	?	33.6; 10	28.0; 9	10.8; 2	13.0; 2	–	–	–	5.6
Sondaxe/La Voz de Galicia	21 Jan–2 Feb 2021	1,223	?	? 10	? 9	? 2	? 2	–	–	–	?
Sondaxe/La Voz de Galicia	1–7 Oct 2020	1,223	?	33.9; 10	28.2; 9	10.3; 2	12.3; 2	–	–	–	5.7
2020 regional election	12 Jul 2020	—N/a	49.0	48.0 (13)	19.4 (4)	3.9 (0)	23.8 (6)	2.0 (0)	0.8 (0)	–	24.2
Sondaxe/La Voz de Galicia	15–22 Jan 2020	1,223	?	32.0; 10	30.2; 10	12.6; 2	9.6; 1	7.6; 0	3.1; 0	–	1.8
November 2019 general election	10 Nov 2019	—N/a	55.9	31.9; 10	31.3; 10	12.7; 2	8.1; 1	7.8; 0	4.4; 0	–	0.6

=== Madrid ===
Polling firm/Commissioner	Fieldwork date	Sample size	Turnout	PSOE	PP	Vox	Unidas Podemos	CS	Más País	Sumar	Lead
2023 general election	23 Jul 2023	—N/a	69.7	27.8; 10	40.5; 16	14.0; 5		–		15.5; 6	12.7
Sigma Dos/El Mundo	3–8 Jul 2023	?	?	? 10	? 16	? 6		–		? 5	?
Sondaxe/La Voz de Galicia	3–7 Jul 2023	?	?	? 10	? 14	? 7		–		? 6	?
GAD3/ABC	29 Jun–7 Jul 2023	?	?	? 10	? 17	? 5		–		? 5	?
YouGov	29 Jun–6 Jul 2023	?	?	28.0; 11	37.0; 14	16.0; 6		–		17.0; 6	9.0
CIS	8–27 Jun 2023	2,587	?	? 10/11	? 14/15	? 4/5		–		? 7/8	?
2023 regional election	28 May 2023	—N/a	65.5	18.2 (7)	47.3 (19)	7.3 (3)	4.8 (1)	1.6 (0)	18.4 (7)	–	28.9
GAD3/Community of Madrid	12–14 Dec 2022	1,003	?	25.1; 10	42.4; 17	14.5; 6	9.5; 3	2.0; 0	4.7; 1	–	17.3
Ágora Integral/Canarias Ahora	5–9 May 2022	500	?	22.7; 9	30.2; 13	22.6; 8	13.8; 5	3.4; 0	5.9; 2	–	7.5
Ágora Integral/Canarias Ahora	1–5 Dec 2021	500	68.3	22.1; 8	29.8; 12	21.5; 8	13.0; 5	4.7; 1	7.4; 3	–	7.7
IMOP/El Confidencial	10–11 Nov 2021	710	?	22.9; 9	32.8; 13	19.8; 7	10.4; 4	3.9; 1	7.5; 3	–	9.9
2021 regional election	4 May 2021	—N/a	71.3	16.8 (6)	44.7 (18)	9.1 (3)	7.2 (3)	3.6 (1)	17.0 (6)	–	27.7
GAD3/ABC	18 May–5 Jun 2020	?	?	? 11	? 12	? 5	? 4	? 4	? 1	–	?
November 2019 general election	10 Nov 2019	—N/a	70.6	26.9; 10	24.9; 10	18.3; 7	13.0; 5	9.1; 3	5.7; 2	–	2.0

=== Murcia ===
Polling firm/Commissioner	Fieldwork date	Sample size	Turnout	Vox	PP	PSOE	Unidas Podemos	CS	Más País	PACMA	Somos Región	Sumar	Lead
2023 general election	23 Jul 2023	—N/a	68.7	21.8; 2	41.2; 4	25.3; 3		–		0.7; 0	0.2; 0	9.6; 1	15.9
CEMOP	3–13 Jul 2023	1,200	70	21.2; 2	42.3; 4/5	24.8; 2/3		–		–	–	8.9; 1	17.5
Sigma Dos/El Mundo	3–8 Jul 2023	?	?	? 2	? 5	? 2		–		–	–	? 1	?
Sondaxe/La Voz de Galicia	3–7 Jul 2023	?	?	? 2	? 4	? 3		–		–	–	? 1	?
GAD3/ABC	29 Jun–7 Jul 2023	?	?	? 3	? 5	? 2		–		–	–	? 0	?
CIS	8–27 Jun 2023	655	?	? 2/3	? 4/5	? 2		–		–	–	? 1	?
2023 regional election	28 May 2023	—N/a	63.2	17.7 (2)	42.8 (5)	25.6 (3)	4.7 (0)	1.5 (0)	1.3 (0)	0.9 (0)	0.3 (0)	–	17.2
Murcia Electoral	29 Jul–5 Aug 2020	1,841	?	28.7; 3	27.5; 3	22.9; 3	8.8; 1	6.6; 0	1.9; 0	–	0.3; 0	–	1.2
Murcia Electoral	2–9 Jun 2020	1,721	?	30.3; 4	26.8; 3	21.6; 2	9.6; 1	7.5; 0	1.2; 0	0.9; 0	0.4; 0	–	3.5
November 2019 general election	10 Nov 2019	—N/a	68.0	28.0; 3	26.5; 3	24.8; 3	8.9; 1	7.4; 0	1.9; 0	1.0; 0	0.3; 0	–	1.5

=== Navarre ===
Polling firm/Commissioner	Fieldwork date	Sample size	Turnout	NA+	PSOE	EH Bildu	Unidas Podemos	Vox	GBai	PP	UPN	Sumar	Lead
2023 general election	23 Jul 2023	—N/a	66.4	–	27.4; 2	17.2; 1		5.7; 0	2.9; 0	16.7; 1	15.3; 1	12.8; 0	10.2
Sigma Dos/EITB	28 Jun–11 Jul 2023	915	72.3	–	27.7; 2	18.0; 1		7.0; 0	4.1; 0	22.4; 2	9.4; 0	10.2; 0	5.3
Sigma Dos/El Mundo	3–8 Jul 2023	?	?	–	? 2	? 1		? 0	? 0	? 1	? 0	? 1	?
Sondaxe/La Voz de Galicia	3–7 Jul 2023	?	?	–	? 2	? 1		? 0	? 0	? 1	? 0	? 1	?
GAD3/ABC	29 Jun–7 Jul 2023	?	?	–	? 2	? 1		? 0	? 0	? 2	? 0	? 0	Tie
CIS	8–27 Jun 2023	439	?	–	? 2	? 1		? 0	? 0	? 1	? 0	? 1	?
2023 regional election	28 May 2023	—N/a	64.4	–	20.7 (1)	17.1 (1)	6.1 (0)	4.3 (0)	13.2 (1)	7.3 (0)	28.0 (2)	–	7.3
GAD3/EITB	22–27 Feb 2023	1,204	?	–	22.2; 1	15.8; 1	11.6; 1	9.9; 0	6.6; 0	22.5; 2	7.5; 0	–	0.3
November 2019 general election	10 Nov 2019	—N/a	65.9	29.6; 2	25.0; 1	16.9; 1	16.6; 1	5.8; 0	3.8; 0	(Note: Within NA+.)		–	4.6

=== Valencian Community ===
Polling firm/Commissioner	Fieldwork date	Sample size	Turnout	PSOE	PP	Vox	Unidas Podemos	CS	Més Compromís	Sumem per Guanyar	Lead
2023 general election	23 Jul 2023	—N/a	71.5	32.1; 11	34.9; 13	15.6; 5	(Note: Within Sumem per Guanyar.)	–		15.2; 4	2.8
Demoscopia y Servicios/ESdiario	13–14 Jul 2023	800	?	28.7; 10	38.0; 13	14.1; 5		–		16.6; 5	9.3
Sigma Dos/El Mundo	3–8 Jul 2023	?	?	? 10	? 13	? 5		–		? 5	?
Sondaxe/La Voz de Galicia	3–7 Jul 2023	?	?	? 8	? 13	? 6		–		? 6	?
GAD3/ABC	29 Jun–7 Jul 2023	?	?	? 11	? 14	? 5		–		? 3	?
CIS	8–27 Jun 2023	2,388	?	? 11	? 11	? 4		–		? 7	Tie
Demoscopia y Servicios/ESdiario	23–24 Jun 2023	800	?	26.8; 9	36.8; 13	15.8; 5		–		17.7; 6	10.0
2023 regional election	28 May 2023	—N/a	67.0	28.7 (11)	35.7 (14)	12.6 (3)	3.6 (0)	1.5 (0)	14.5 (5)	–	7.0
SyM Consulting/EPDA	24 Apr–14 Sep 2022	2,447	68.8	24.9; 9/10	27.8; 9/11	23.1; 7/8	12.0; 3/4	1.3; 0	7.5; 1/2	–	2.9
SyM Consulting/EPDA	2–4 Feb 2022	1,293	?	27.5; 10/11	26.4; 8/10	22.6; 8/9	10.7; 2/3	1.7; 0	7.9; 1/2	–	1.1
SyM Consulting/EPDA	14–18 Jul 2021	1,066	?	27.3; 9/11	26.6; 9/10	20.0; 7	10.1; 2/4	2.3; 0	10.5; 2/3	–	0.7
ElectoPanel/Electomanía	16–20 Nov 2020	?	?	26.0– 27.0	22.0– 24.0	20.0– 21.0	12.0– 13.0	7.0– 8.0	8.0– 9.0	–	3.0– 4.0
Demoscopia y Servicios/ESdiario	17–19 Jun 2020	?	64.3	25.8; 9	28.1; 10	18.7; 6	14.9; 5	6.7; 1	4.4; 1	–	2.3
November 2019 general election	10 Nov 2019	—N/a	69.8	27.6; 10	23.0; 8	18.5; 7	13.4; 4	7.7; 2	7.0; 1	–	4.6

== Constituencies ==
=== A Coruña ===
Polling firm/Commissioner	Fieldwork date	Sample size	Turnout	PP	PSdeG–PSOE	EC	BNG	Vox	CS	Sumar	Lead
2023 general election	23 Jul 2023	—N/a	62.9	43.1; 4	28.2; 2		10.0; 1	5.1; 0	–	12.2; 1	14.9
CIS	8–27 Jun 2023	794	?	? 3/4	? 2/3		? 1	? 0	–	? 1	?
Sondaxe/La Voz de Galicia	16–23 Jun 2021	?	?	? 3	? 3	? 1	? 1	–	–	–	Tie
Sondaxe/La Voz de Galicia	1–7 Oct 2020	?	?	? 3	? 3	? 1	? 1	–	–	–	Tie
2020 regional election	12 Jul 2020	—N/a	49.6	49.2 (5)	16.8 (1)	4.4 (0)	24.9 (2)	2.1 (0)	0.5 (0)	–	24.3
November 2019 general election	10 Nov 2019	—N/a	57.0	30.5; 3	30.0; 3	12.6; 1	9.5; 1	8.2; 0	4.6; 0	–	0.5

=== Álava ===
Polling firm/Commissioner	Fieldwork date	Sample size	Turnout	PNV	PSE–EE (PSOE)	Elkarrekin Podemos	EH Bildu	PP	Vox	CS	PP+Cs	Sumar	Lead
2023 general election	23 Jul 2023	—N/a	65.5	16.6; 1	27.7; 1		19.5; 1	17.9; 1	3.9; 0	–	–	12.7; 0	8.2
Gizaker/EITB	28 Jun–11 Jul 2023	800	61.0	20.8; 1	25.5; 1		20.9; 1	18.9; 1	2.5; 0	–	–	10.0; 0	4.7
CIS	8–27 Jun 2023	370	?	? 1	? 1/2		? 0/1	? 0/1	? 0	–	–	? 1	?
Ikerfel/GPS	20–23 Jun 2023	400	62.0	21.7; 1	24.8; 1		19.9; 1	18.1; 1	4.0; 0	–	–	8.9; 0	3.1
2023 foral election	28 May 2023	—N/a	59.6	25.9 (1)	18.4 (1)	7.0 (0)	25.1 (1)	17.0 (1)	3.0 (0)	–	–	–	0.8
2020 regional election	12 Jul 2020	—N/a	49.0	31.9 (2)	15.5 (1)	8.0 (0)	24.6 (1)	(Note: Within PP+Cs.)	3.8 (0)		11.4 (0)	–	7.3
November 2019 general election	10 Nov 2019	—N/a	66.6	23.6; 1	21.9; 1	16.5; 1	16.1; 1	14.9; 0	3.8; 0	1.5; 0	–	–	1.7

=== Albacete ===
Polling firm/Commissioner	Fieldwork date	Sample size	Turnout	PSOE	PP	Vox	Unidas Podemos	CS	Sumar	Lead
2023 general election	23 Jul 2023	—N/a	72.7	34.5; 2	39.9; 2	16.6; 0		–	7.2; 0	5.4
CIS	8–27 Jun 2023	456	?	? 2	? 2	? 0		–	? 0	Tie
2023 regional election	28 May 2023	—N/a	69.0	42.6 (2)	35.5 (2)	12.4 (0)	4.7 (0)	1.6 (0)	–	7.1
November 2019 general election	10 Nov 2019	—N/a	70.0	32.6; 2	27.5; 1	20.7; 1	9.7; 0	7.4; 0	–	5.1

=== Alicante ===
Polling firm/Commissioner	Fieldwork date	Sample size	Turnout	PSOE	PP	Vox	Unidas Podemos	CS	Més Compromís	Sumem per Guanyar	Lead
2023 general election	23 Jul 2023	—N/a	69.6	32.0; 4	36.7; 5	16.3; 2		–		12.9; 1	4.7
Demoscopia y Servicios/ESdiario	13–14 Jul 2023	?	?	27.8; 3	39.8; 5	14.5; 2		–		15.3; 2	12.0
CIS	8–27 Jun 2023	911	?	? 4	? 4	? 2		–		? 2	Tie
Demoscopia y Servicios/ESdiario	23–24 Jun 2023	?	?	25.4; 3	38.5; 5	16.7; 2		–		16.5; 2	13.1
2023 regional election	28 May 2023	—N/a	63.3	29.5 (4)	39.3 (6)	12.3 (1)	3.5 (0)	1.5 (0)	10.2 (1)	–	9.8
SyM Consulting/EPDA	2–4 Feb 2022	406	65.0	29.2; 4	28.7; 3/4	21.8; 3	10.3; 1	0.8; 0	5.1; 0/1	–	0.5
SyM Consulting/EPDA	14–18 Jul 2021	361	?	28.0; 3/4	30.3; 4	21.7; 3	10.0; 1	1.2; 0	4.8; 0/1	–	2.3
Demoscopia y Servicios/ESdiario	17–19 Jun 2020	?	?	26.5; 4	29.1; 4	19.7; 2	13.8; 2	6.6; 0	2.9; 0	–	2.6
November 2019 general election	10 Nov 2019	—N/a	67.4	28.2; 4	24.3; 3	19.7; 3	12.7; 1	8.1; 1	4.2; 0	–	3.9

=== Almería ===
Polling firm/Commissioner	Fieldwork date	Sample size	Turnout	PSOE	Vox	PP	Unidas Podemos	CS	Sumar	Lead
2023 general election	23 Jul 2023	—N/a	62.9	29.0; 2	21.3; 1	40.9; 3		–	6.7; 0	11.9
CIS	8–27 Jun 2023	480	?	? 2	? 1	? 3		–	? 0	?
2022 regional election	19 Jun 2022	—N/a	51.3	22.1 (1)	20.7 (1)	45.6 (4)	5.0 (0)	2.6 (0)	–	23.5
GAD3/Ideal	18–23 Feb 2022	801	?	27.5; 2	33.7; 2	26.3; 2	4.5; 0	2.3; 0	–	5.8
November 2019 general election	10 Nov 2019	—N/a	60.8	29.5; 2	26.7; 2	25.8; 2	8.1; 0	7.6; 0	–	2.8

=== Ávila ===
Polling firm/Commissioner	Fieldwork date	Sample size	Turnout	PP	PSOE	Vox	CS	Unidas Podemos	XAV	Sumar	Lead
2023 general election	23 Jul 2023	—N/a	72.5	43.3; 1	27.4; 1	15.4; 1	–		7.5; 0	5.1; 0	15.9
CIS	8–27 Jun 2023	351	?	? 1/2	? 1/2	? 0	–		–	? 0	Tie
2022 regional election	13 Feb 2022	—N/a	60.2	34.0 (1)	24.2 (1)	17.4 (1)	2.4 (0)	3.7 (0)	16.7 (0)	–	9.8
GAD3/El Norte de Castilla	22–31 May 2021	?	?	? 2	? 1	? 0	–	–	–	–	?
November 2019 general election	10 Nov 2019	—N/a	69.3	34.8; 1	26.2; 1	18.5; 1	6.5; 0	6.5; 0	5.8; 0	–	8.6

=== Biscay ===
Polling firm/Commissioner	Fieldwork date	Sample size	Turnout	PNV	PSE–EE (PSOE)	Elkarrekin Podemos	EH Bildu	PP	Vox	CS	PP+Cs	Sumar	Lead
2023 general election	23 Jul 2023	—N/a	65.2	26.9; 2	25.8; 2		20.6; 2	11.6; 1	2.6; 0	–	–	10.9; 1	1.1
Gizaker/EITB	28 Jun–11 Jul 2023	800	62.0	30.4; 2	23.3; 2		21.7; 2	10.2; 1	2.5; 0	–	–	10.8; 1	7.1
CIS	8–27 Jun 2023	619	?	? 2	? 2/3		? 1/2	? 1	? 0	–	–	? 1	?
Ikerfel/GPS	20–23 Jun 2023	603	61.0	29.0; 2	21.8; 2		22.8; 2	10.3; 1	3.5; 0	–	–	10.2; 1	6.2
2023 foral election	28 May 2023	—N/a	60.1	38.4 (4)	15.9 (1)	7.3 (0)	25.0 (3)	8.2 (0)	2.0 (0)	–	–	–	13.4
2020 regional election	12 Jul 2020	—N/a	50.4	42.2 (4)	13.5 (1)	8.5 (1)	23.7 (2)		1.9 (0)		6.8 (0)	–	18.5
November 2019 general election	10 Nov 2019	—N/a	66.8	35.2; 3	19.1; 2	15.4; 1	15.0; 1	8.8; 1	2.4; 0	1.1; 0	–	–	16.1

=== Burgos ===
Polling firm/Commissioner	Fieldwork date	Sample size	Turnout	PSOE	PP	Vox	Unidas Podemos	CS	Sumar	Lead
2023 general election	23 Jul 2023	—N/a	69.1	34.4; 2	40.6; 2	12.8; 0		–	8.6; 0	6.2
CIS	8–27 Jun 2023	446	?	? 2	? 1/2	? 0		–	? 0/1	?
2022 regional election	13 Feb 2022	—N/a	59.0	32.6 (2)	30.9 (1)	16.6 (1)	6.2 (0)	5.0 (0)	–	1.7
GAD3/El Norte de Castilla	22–31 May 2021	?	?	? 1	? 3	? 0	–	–	–	?
November 2019 general election	10 Nov 2019	—N/a	67.5	32.3; 2	30.8; 2	14.9; 0	11.1; 0	8.2; 0	–	1.5

=== Castellón ===
Polling firm/Commissioner	Fieldwork date	Sample size	Turnout	PSOE	PP	Vox	Unidas Podemos	CS	Més Compromís	Sumem per Guanyar	Lead
2023 general election	23 Jul 2023	—N/a	72.3	32.6; 2	35.2; 2	15.9; 1		–		14.3; 0	2.6
Demoscopia y Servicios/ESdiario	13–14 Jul 2023	?	?	29.8; 2	38.3; 2	14.8; 1		–		14.7; 0	8.5
CIS	8–27 Jun 2023	471	?	? 2	? 2	? 0		–		? 1	Tie
Demoscopia y Servicios/ESdiario	23–24 Jun 2023	?	?	28.2; 1	36.6; 2	16.6; 1		–		16.1; 1	8.4
2023 regional election	28 May 2023	—N/a	68.2	30.2 (2)	36.0 (2)	13.1 (0)	3.2 (0)	1.4 (0)	13.1 (1)	–	5.8
SyM Consulting/EPDA	24–28 May 2022	954	68.6	28.1; 2	27.8; 1/2	22.9; 1	10.0; 0/1	1.3; 0	7.5; 0	–	0.3
SyM Consulting/EPDA	2–4 Feb 2022	376	71.5	27.4; 2	24.9; 1/2	26.4; 1/2	10.8; 0	2.8; 0	4.9; 0	–	1.0
SyM Consulting/EPDA	14–18 Jul 2021	274	?	28.6; 2	25.8; 1/2	19.9; 1	11.9; 0/1	5.2; 0	6.1; 0	–	2.8
Demoscopia y Servicios/ESdiario	17–19 Jun 2020	?	?	26.3; 1	28.6; 2	18.7; 1	14.9; 1	6.3; 0	3.9; 0	–	2.3
November 2019 general election	10 Nov 2019	—N/a	70.7	28.6; 2	23.8; 1	18.6; 1	13.3; 1	6.9; 0	6.2; 0	–	4.8

=== Ceuta ===
Polling firm/Commissioner	Fieldwork date	Sample size	Turnout	Vox	PSOE	PP	Unidas Podemos	CS	MDyC	Sumar	Lead
2023 general election	23 Jul 2023	—N/a	53.2	23.3; 0	34.0; 0	38.8; 1		–	–	2.5; 0	4.8
CIS	8–27 Jun 2023	52	?	? 0	? 0	? 1		–	–	? 0	?
2023 Assembly election	28 May 2023	—N/a	54.8	20.6; 0	21.0; 0	34.3; 1	0.6; 0	0.7; 0	11.2; 0	–	13.3
SyM Consulting	7–11 Apr 2023	818	57.9	34.9; 1	21.6; 0	32.2; 0	4.8; 0	0.2; 0	–	–	2.7
Dialoga Consultores/CeutaTV (Note: Undecided and/or abstentionists excluded.)	9 Apr 2023	600	?	16.9; 0	39.2; 1	37.6; 0	0.8; 0	–	–	–	1.6
SyM Consulting	5–9 Dec 2022	1,279	49.7	34.5; 1	27.4; 0	26.1; 0	3.1; 0	0.2; 0	–	–	7.1
GAD3/El Pueblo de Ceuta	2–14 Sep 2022	684	?	23.2; 0	27.1; 0	41.2; 1	3.4; 0	0.9; 0	2.1; 0	–	14.1
SyM Consulting	6–10 Jul 2022	1,116	52.0	39.7; 1	26.8; 0	24.7; 0	2.7; 0	0.1; 0	–	–	12.9
SyM Consulting	16–19 Dec 2021	740	55.3	38.8; 1	25.2; 0	26.3; 0	3.0; 0	0.2; 0	–	–	12.5
SyM Consulting	20–23 May 2021	732	57.4	34.3; 1	24.4; 0	31.1; 0	5.4; 0	0.4; 0	–	–	3.2
SyM Consulting	9–12 Dec 2020	652	50.0	36.5; 1	22.7; 0	27.4; 0	6.5; 0	2.2; 0	–	–	9.1
November 2019 general election	10 Nov 2019	—N/a	54.0	35.2; 1	31.3; 0	22.3; 0	3.9; 0	3.4; 0	2.5; 0	–	3.9

=== Gipuzkoa ===
Polling firm/Commissioner	Fieldwork date	Sample size	Turnout	PNV	EH Bildu	PSE–EE (PSOE)	Elkarrekin Podemos	PP	Vox	CS	PP+Cs	Sumar	Lead
2023 general election	23 Jul 2023	—N/a	64.7	22.6; 2	31.2; 2	23.3; 2		8.7; 0	2.1; 0	–	–	10.6; 0	7.9
Gizaker/EITB	28 Jun–11 Jul 2023	800	59.0	27.4; 2	31.7; 2	21.5; 2		6.7; 0	0.7; 0	–	–	10.6; 0	4.3
CIS	8–27 Jun 2023	507	?	? 1/2	? 2/3	? 1/2		? 0	? 0	–	–	? 1	?
Ikerfel/GPS	20–23 Jun 2023	450	59.5	22.8; 2	31.8; 2	24.5; 2		8.8; 0	2.0; 0	–	–	7.8; 0	7.3
2023 foral election	28 May 2023	—N/a	59.9	32.0 (2)	36.6 (3)	15.7 (1)	6.5 (0)	6.3 (0)	–	–	–	–	4.6
2020 regional election	12 Jul 2020	—N/a	50.4	36.1 (3)	34.9 (2)	12.8 (1)	7.1 (0)		1.3 (0)		4.6 (0)	–	1.2
November 2019 general election	10 Nov 2019	—N/a	65.8	30.5; 2	25.8; 2	18.1; 1	15.0; 1	6.2; 0	1.9; 0	1.0; 0	–	–	4.7

=== León ===
Polling firm/Commissioner	Fieldwork date	Sample size	Turnout	PSOE	PP	Vox	Unidas Podemos	CS	UPL	Sumar	Lead
2023 general election	23 Jul 2023	—N/a	65.7	33.6; 2	36.9; 2	12.9; 0		–	8.2; 0	6.7; 0	3.3
CIS	8–27 Jun 2023	464	?	? 2	? 2	? 0		–	–	? 0	Tie
2022 regional election	13 Feb 2022	—N/a	53.5	28.5 (1)	25.0 (1)	15.4 (1)	5.0 (0)	2.2 (0)	21.3 (1)	–	3.5
GAD3/El Norte de Castilla	22–31 May 2021	?	?	? 2	? 2	? 0	? 0	? 0	? 0	–	?
November 2019 general election	10 Nov 2019	—N/a	61.5	33.5; 2	28.4; 1	15.6; 1	10.5; 0	6.4; 0	3.6; 0	–	5.1

=== Melilla ===
Polling firm/Commissioner	Fieldwork date	Sample size	Turnout	PP	CpM	Vox	PSOE	CS	Unidas Podemos	Sumar	Lead
2023 general election	23 Jul 2023	—N/a	45.2	49.2; 1	4.7; 0	15.9; 0	25.4; 0	–		3.0; 0	23.8
CIS	8–27 Jun 2023	59	?	? 1	? 0	? 0	? 0	–		? 0	?
2023 Assembly election	28 May 2023	—N/a	49.5	52.6; 1	18.8; 0	9.9; 0	10.8; 0	–	1.0; 0	–	33.8
SyM Consulting	27 Mar–3 Apr 2023	853	65.5	30.1; 0/1	30.2; 0/1	22.8; 0	13.9; 0	0.9; 0	0.5; 0	–	0.1
SyM Consulting	2–5 Nov 2022	1,186	57.6	30.9; 0	32.5; 1	20.0; 0	13.6; 0	0.3; 0	0.7; 0	–	1.6
SyM Consulting	8–11 Sep 2022	1,207	57.2	29.2; 0	30.5; 1	17.0; 0	20.0; 0	0.1; 0	0.5; 0	–	1.3
SyM Consulting	8–12 Jun 2022	884	68.4	33.0; 0/1	33.0; 0/1	19.6; 0	12.3; 0	0.1; 0	0.3; 0	–	Tie
SyM Consulting	11–16 May 2022	1,126	63.6	30.5; 0	30.6; 1	23.6; 0	13.1; 0	0.1; 0	0.4; 0	–	0.1
SyM Consulting	1–3 Apr 2022	931	66.1	31.3; 0	31.7; 1	21.0; 0	14.2; 0	0.2; 0	0.4; 0	–	0.4
SyM Consulting	16–18 Dec 2021	828	58.1	30.3; 0	31.1; 1	18.6; 0	16.8; 0	0.7; 0	1.3; 0	–	0.8
November 2019 general election	10 Nov 2019	—N/a	52.4	29.5; 1	29.0; 0	18.4; 0	16.4; 0	3.0; 0	2.6; 0	–	0.5

=== Palencia ===
Polling firm/Commissioner	Fieldwork date	Sample size	Turnout	PP	PSOE	Vox	Unidas Podemos	CS	Sumar	Lead
2023 general election	23 Jul 2023	—N/a	71.3	42.0; 2	34.7; 1	12.9; 0		–	6.1; 0	7.3
CIS	8–27 Jun 2023	345	?	? 2	? 1	? 0		–	? 0	?
2022 regional election	13 Feb 2022	—N/a	61.6	32.9 (1)	33.9 (1)	18.0 (1)	4.3 (0)	5.5 (0)	–	1.0
GAD3/El Norte de Castilla	22–31 May 2021	?	?	? 2	? 1	? 0	–	–	–	?
November 2019 general election	10 Nov 2019	—N/a	68.7	35.7; 2	33.2; 1	14.4; 0	8.1; 0	6.2; 0	–	2.5

=== Pontevedra ===
Polling firm/Commissioner	Fieldwork date	Sample size	Turnout	PSdeG–PSOE	PP	EC	BNG	Vox	CS	Sumar	Lead
2023 general election	23 Jul 2023	—N/a	63.7	31.4; 3	39.7; 3		9.4; 0	4.8; 0	–	13.2; 1	8.3
CIS	8–27 Jun 2023	597	?	? 2/3	? 2/3		? 1	? 0	–	? 1	Tie
Sondaxe/La Voz de Galicia	16–23 Jun 2021	?	?	? 2	? 3	? 1	11.0; 1	–	–	–	?
Sondaxe/La Voz de Galicia	1–7 Oct 2020	?	?	26.3; 2	? 3	? 1	13.2; 1	–	–	–	?
2020 regional election	12 Jul 2020	—N/a	50.4	23.1 (2)	42.4 (3)	4.6 (0)	24.7 (2)	2.0 (0)	1.0 (0)	–	17.7
November 2019 general election	10 Nov 2019	—N/a	58.5	31.8; 3	29.1; 3	15.5; 1	7.5; 0	7.3; 0	4.6; 0	–	2.7

=== Salamanca ===
Polling firm/Commissioner	Fieldwork date	Sample size	Turnout	PP	PSOE	Vox	CS	Unidas Podemos	Sumar	Lead
2023 general election	23 Jul 2023	—N/a	67.0	46.9; 3	30.5; 1	14.7; 0	–		5.5; 0	16.4
CIS	8–27 Jun 2023	368	?	? 2	? 2	? 0	–		? 0	Tie
2022 regional election	13 Feb 2022	—N/a	56.4	38.8 (2)	29.6 (1)	18.0 (1)	4.9 (0)	3.5 (0)	–	9.2
GAD3/El Norte de Castilla	22–31 May 2021	?	?	? 3	? 1	? 0	–	–	–	?
November 2019 general election	10 Nov 2019	—N/a	64.7	34.7; 2	29.5; 1	17.9; 1	8.7; 0	7.0; 0	–	5.2

=== Segovia ===
Polling firm/Commissioner	Fieldwork date	Sample size	Turnout	PP	PSOE	Vox	Unidas Podemos	CS	Sumar	Lead
2023 general election	23 Jul 2023	—N/a	75.3	45.0; 2	30.6; 1	14.1; 0		–	8.1; 0	14.4
CIS	8–27 Jun 2023	329	?	? 1/2	? 1/2	? 0		–	? 0	Tie
2022 regional election	13 Feb 2022	—N/a	63.2	34.7 (1)	31.4 (1)	19.5 (1)	6.0 (0)	4.9 (0)	–	3.3
GAD3/El Norte de Castilla	22–31 May 2021	?	?	? 2	? 1	? 0	–	–	–	?
November 2019 general election	10 Nov 2019	—N/a	72.3	33.0; 1	29.7; 1	17.1; 1	9.3; 0	8.1; 0	–	3.3

=== Soria ===
Polling firm/Commissioner	Fieldwork date	Sample size	Turnout	PSOE	PP	Vox	Unidas Podemos	CS	SY	Sumar	Lead
2023 general election	23 Jul 2023	—N/a	67.5	29.5; 1	37.2; 1	9.8; 0		–	19.1; 0	3.4; 0	7.7
CIS	8–27 Jun 2023	277	?	? 1	? 1	? 0		–	–	? 0	Tie
2022 regional election	13 Feb 2022	—N/a	59.8	18.1 (0)	23.9 (1)	11.5 (0)	2.2 (0)	0.8 (0)	42.7 (1)	–	18.8
GAD3/El Norte de Castilla	22–31 May 2021	?	?	? 1	? 1	–	–	–	–	–	?
November 2019 general election	10 Nov 2019	—N/a	61.5	34.6; 1	32.9; 1	13.5; 0	7.6; 0	5.8; 0	–	–	1.7

=== Valencia ===
Polling firm/Commissioner	Fieldwork date	Sample size	Turnout	PSOE	PP	Vox	Unidas Podemos	Més Compromís	CS	Sumem per Guanyar	Lead
2023 general election	23 Jul 2023	—N/a	72.6	32.1; 5	33.6; 6	15.2; 2			–	16.9; 3	1.5
Demoscopia y Servicios/ESdiario	13–14 Jul 2023	?	?	29.1; 5	36.8; 6	13.7; 2		–		17.9; 3	7.7
CIS	8–27 Jun 2023	1,006	?	? 5	? 5	? 2		–		? 4	Tie
Demoscopia y Servicios/ESdiario	23–24 Jun 2023	?	?	27.4; 5	35.7; 6	15.0; 3		–		19.0; 3	8.3
2023 regional election	28 May 2023	—N/a	69.1	27.9 (5)	33.6 (6)	12.6 (2)	3.7 (0)	17.4 (3)	1.5 (0)	–	5.7
SyM Consulting/EPDA	24–26 Apr 2022	795	70.7	24.5; 4	25.4; 4	22.5; 3/4	13.4; 2	9.4; 1/2	1.6; 0	–	0.9
SyM Consulting/EPDA	2–4 Feb 2022	511	67.8	26.5; 4/5	25.4; 4	22.2; 4	10.8; 1/2	10.1; 1	2.0; 0	–	1.1
SyM Consulting/EPDA	14–18 Jul 2021	432	?	26.5; 4/5	24.3; 4	18.9; 3	9.9; 1/2	15.1; 2	2.4; 0	–	2.2
Demoscopia y Servicios/ESdiario	17–19 Jun 2020	?	?	25.1; 4	27.3; 4	18.1; 3	15.6; 2	5.5; 1	6.9; 1	–	2.2
November 2019 general election	10 Nov 2019	—N/a	71.2	27.0; 4	22.1; 4	17.7; 3	13.8; 2	8.8; 1	7.7; 1	–	4.9

=== Valladolid ===
Polling firm/Commissioner	Fieldwork date	Sample size	Turnout	PSOE	PP	Vox	Unidas Podemos	CS	Sumar	Lead
2023 general election	23 Jul 2023	—N/a	74.0	32.8; 2	40.8; 2	15.2; 1		–	8.9; 0	8.0
CIS	8–27 Jun 2023	476	?	? 2	? 2	? 0		–	? 1	Tie
2022 regional election	13 Feb 2022	—N/a	64.7	31.3 (2)	30.9 (2)	20.0 (1)	6.9 (0)	6.9 (0)	–	0.4
GAD3/El Norte de Castilla	22–31 May 2021	?	?	? 1	? 3	? 1	–	–	–	?
November 2019 general election	10 Nov 2019	—N/a	72.8	30.3; 2	29.5; 2	18.1; 1	11.0; 0	8.7; 0	–	0.8

=== Zamora ===
Polling firm/Commissioner	Fieldwork date	Sample size	Turnout	PP	PSOE	Vox	Unidas Podemos	CS	Sumar	Lead
2023 general election	23 Jul 2023	—N/a	64.2	44.7; 2	32.5; 1	13.2; 0		–	5.6; 0	12.2
CIS	8–27 Jun 2023	331	?	? 2	? 1	? 0		–	? 0	?
2022 regional election	13 Feb 2022	—N/a	53.3	33.6 (1)	32.7 (1)	18.9 (1)	3.2 (0)	3.6 (0)	–	0.9
GAD3/El Norte de Castilla	22–31 May 2021	?	?	? 2	? 1	? 0	–	–	–	?
November 2019 general election	10 Nov 2019	—N/a	60.2	33.6; 1	32.8; 1	17.1; 1	7.0; 0	6.8; 0	–	0.8
