= 2019 Basque foral elections =

Elections in the Spanish region of the Basque Country

Foral elections were held in the Basque Country on 26 May 2019 to elect the 11th General Assemblies of Álava, Biscay and Gipuzkoa. All 153 seats in the three General Assemblies were up for election. They were held concurrently with regional elections in twelve autonomous communities and local elections all across Spain, as well as the 2019 European Parliament election.

== Overall ==
← Summary of the 26 May 2019 Basque foral election results →
Parties and alliances	Popular vote			Seats	
Parties and alliances	Votes	%	±pp	Total	+/−
Basque Nationalist Party (EAJ/PNV)	434,239	38.68	+5.43	62	+8
Basque Country Gather (EH Bildu)	266,946	23.78	+1.40	39	±0
Socialist Party of the Basque Country–Basque Country Left (PSE–EE (PSOE))	191,054	17.02	+3.41	27	+6
United We Can (Podemos, Ezker Anitza–IU, Equo Berdeak)^{1}	111,315	9.92	−6.49	14	−7
People's Party (PP)	80,743	7.19	−2.14	11	−6
Citizens–Party of the Citizenry (Cs)	14,440	1.29	−0.76	0	−1
Vox (Vox)	7,807	0.70	+0.51	0	±0
Omnia (Omnia)	1,206	0.11	New	0	±0
European Solidarity Action Party (Solidaria)	1,183	0.11	New	0	±0
Free for the Basque Country (LxE)	952	0.08	New	0	±0
Bilbaine People, Initiative for Bilbao (BIB)	933	0.08	New	0	±0
Blank Seats (EB/AZ)	602	0.05	New	0	±0
Let's Win Bilbao (GGB)	557	0.05	New	0	±0
Humanist Party (PH)	507	0.05	±0.00	0	±0
For a Fairer World (PUM+J)	328	0.03	New	0	±0
Communist Party of the Workers of the Basque Country (PCTE/ELAK)	285	0.03	New	0	±0
Blank ballots	9,512	0.85	−0.70		
Total	1,122,609			153	±0
Valid votes	1,122,609	99.17	+0.40		
Invalid votes	9,423	0.83	−0.40		
Votes cast / turnout	1,132,032	65.95	+2.19		
Abstentions	584,576	34.05	−2.19		
Registered voters	1,716,608				
Sources
Footnotes: ^{1} United We Can results are compared to the combined totals of We Can and Winning in the 2015 elections.

Popular vote
EAJ/PNV	38.68%
EH Bildu	23.78%
PSE–EE (PSOE)	17.02%
E. Podemos	9.92%
PP	7.19%
Cs	1.29%
Others	1.28%
Blank ballots	0.85%

== Deputation control ==
The following table lists party control in the foral deputations. Gains for a party are highlighted in that party's colour.

Province	Population	Previous control	New control
Álava	328,868	Basque Nationalist Party (EAJ/PNV)	Basque Nationalist Party (EAJ/PNV)
Biscay	1,149,628	Basque Nationalist Party (EAJ/PNV)	Basque Nationalist Party (EAJ/PNV)
Gipuzkoa	720,592	Basque Nationalist Party (EAJ/PNV)	Basque Nationalist Party (EAJ/PNV)

== Historical territories ==
=== Álava ===
← Summary of the 26 May 2019 General Assembly of Álava election results →
Parties and alliances	Popular vote			Seats	
Parties and alliances	Votes	%	±pp	Total	+/−
Basque Nationalist Party (EAJ/PNV)	47,686	29.43	+7.83	17	+4
Basque Country Gather (EH Bildu)	33,954	20.96	+0.60	12	+1
Socialist Party of the Basque Country–Basque Country Left (PSE–EE (PSOE))	30,555	18.86	+7.66	10	+5
People's Party (PP)	24,256	14.97	−7.02	8	−4
United We Can (Podemos, Ezker Anitza–IU, Equo Berdeak)^{1}	16,027	9.89	−8.37	4	−5
Citizens–Party of the Citizenry (Cs)	3,721	2.30	−0.80	0	−1
Vox (Vox)	2,272	1.40	+1.33	0	±0
Omnia (Omnia)	1,206	0.74	New	0	±0
Free for the Basque Country (LxE)	952	0.59	New	0	±0
Blank ballots	1,402	0.87	−0.78		
Total	162,031			51	±0
Valid votes	162,031	98.96	+0.56		
Invalid votes	1,696	1.04	−0.56		
Votes cast / turnout	163,727	65.26	−0.39		
Abstentions	87,155	34.74	+0.39		
Registered voters	250,882				
Sources
Footnotes: ^{1} United We Can results are compared to the combined totals of We Can and Winning in the 2015 election.

=== Biscay ===
← Summary of the 26 May 2019 General Assembly of Biscay election results →
Parties and alliances	Popular vote			Seats	
Parties and alliances	Votes	%	±pp	Total	+/−
Basque Nationalist Party (EAJ/PNV)	255,754	43.12	+5.49	25	+2
Basque Country Gather (EH Bildu)	116,794	19.69	+0.83	10	−1
Socialist Party of the Basque Country–Basque Country Left (PSE–EE (PSOE))	97,653	16.46	+4.01	8	+1
United We Can (Podemos, Ezker Anitza–IU, Equo Berdeak)^{1}	62,430	10.53	−6.61	6	±0
People's Party (PP)	39,197	6.61	−1.59	2	−2
Citizens–Party of the Citizenry (Cs)	7,034	1.19	−0.94	0	±0
Vox (Vox)	5,535	0.93	+0.58	0	±0
European Solidarity Action Party (Solidaria)	1,183	0.20	New	0	±0
Bilbaine People, Initiative for Bilbao (BIB)	933	0.16	New	0	±0
Let's Win Bilbao (GGB)	557	0.09	New	0	±0
Humanist Party (PH)	507	0.09	−0.01	0	±0
For a Fairer World (PUM+J)	328	0.06	New	0	±0
Communist Party of the Workers of the Basque Country (PCTE/ELAK)	285	0.05	New	0	±0
Blank ballots	4,905	0.83	−0.75		
Total	593,095			51	±0
Valid votes	593,095	99.23	+0.56		
Invalid votes	4,613	0.77	−0.56		
Votes cast / turnout	597,708	65.71	+3.14		
Abstentions	311,956	34.29	−3.14		
Registered voters	909,664				
Sources
Footnotes: ^{1} United We Can results are compared to the combined totals of We Can and Winning in the 2015 election.

=== Gipuzkoa ===
← Summary of the 26 May 2019 General Assembly of Gipuzkoa election results →
Parties and alliances	Popular vote			Seats	
Parties and alliances	Votes	%	±pp	Total	+/−
Basque Nationalist Party (EAJ/PNV)	130,799	35.59	+4.02	20	+2
Basque Country Gather (EH Bildu)	116,198	31.62	+2.78	17	±0
Socialist Party of the Basque Country–Basque Country Left (PSE–EE (PSOE))	62,846	17.10	+0.58	9	±0
United We Can (Podemos, Ezker Anitza–IU, Equo Berdeak)^{1}	32,858	8.94	−5.47	4	−2
People's Party (PP)	17,290	4.70	−0.72	1	±0
Citizens–Party of the Citizenry (Cs)	3,685	1.00	−0.47	0	±0
Blank Seats (EB/AZ)	602	0.16	New	0	±0
Blank ballots	3,205	0.87	−0.58		
Total	367,483			51	±0
Valid votes	367,483	99.16	+0.06		
Invalid votes	3,114	0.84	−0.06		
Votes cast / turnout	370,597	66.65	+1.77		
Abstentions	185,465	33.35	−1.77		
Registered voters	556,062				
Sources
Footnotes: ^{1} United We Can results are compared to the combined totals of We Can and Winning in the 2015 election.
