= 2015 Basque foral elections =

Elections in the Spanish region of the Basque Country

Foral elections were held in the Basque Country on 24 May 2015 to elect the 10th General Assemblies of Álava, Biscay and Gipuzkoa. All 153 seats in the three General Assemblies were up for election. They were held concurrently with regional elections in thirteen autonomous communities and local elections all across Spain.

== Overall ==
← Summary of the 24 May 2015 Basque foral election results →
Parties and alliances	Popular vote			Seats	
Parties and alliances	Votes	%	±pp	Total	+/−
Basque Nationalist Party (EAJ/PNV)	360,279	33.25	+2.32	54	+5
Basque Country Gather (EH Bildu)^{1}	242,431	22.38	−6.41	39	−7
We Can (Podemos/Ahal Dugu)	148,626	13.72	New	20	+20
Socialist Party of the Basque Country–Basque Country Left (PSE–EE (PSOE))	147,432	13.61	−3.17	21	−7
People's Party (PP)	101,084	9.33	−4.99	17	−11
Winning (Irabazi)	29,148	2.69	New	1	+1
Citizens–Party of the Citizenry (C's)	22,256	2.05	New	1	+1
Union, Progress and Democracy (UPyD)	5,595	0.52	−0.28	0	±0
Animalist Party Against Mistreatment of Animals (PACMA/ATTKAA)	3,377	0.31	New	0	±0
Joint Initiative (IKune)	3,288	0.30	New	0	±0
Vox–Family and Life Party (Vox–PFyV)	2,093	0.19	New	0	±0
Humanist Party (PH)	561	0.05	+0.04	0	±0
Basque Communists–Communist Party of the Peoples of Spain (EK–PCPE)	515	0.05	New	0	±0
United Left–Greens (EB–B)	n/a	n/a	−3.32	0	−2
Blank ballots	16,779	1.55	−0.74		
Total	1,083,464			153	±0
Valid votes	1,083,464	98.77	+0.23		
Invalid votes	13,520	1.23	−0.23		
Votes cast / turnout	1,096,984	63.76	+0.21		
Abstentions	623,387	36.24	−0.21		
Registered voters	1,720,371				
Sources
Footnotes: ^{1} Basque Country Gather results are compared to the combined totals of Gather–Basque Solidarity–Alternative and Aralar in the 2011 elections.

Popular vote
EAJ/PNV	33.25%
EH Bildu	22.38%
Podemos	13.72%
PSE–EE (PSOE)	13.61%
PP	9.33%
Irabazi	2.69%
C's	2.05%
Others	1.42%
Blank ballots	1.55%

== Deputation control ==
The following table lists party control in the foral deputations. Gains for a party are highlighted in that party's colour.

Province	Population	Previous control	New control
Álava	321,932	People's Party (PP)	Basque Nationalist Party (EAJ/PNV)
Biscay	1,151,905	Basque Nationalist Party (EAJ/PNV)	Basque Nationalist Party (EAJ/PNV)
Gipuzkoa (Note: Renamed from Guipúzcoa in July 2011.)	715,018	Basque Country Gather (EH Bildu)	Basque Nationalist Party (EAJ/PNV)

== Historical territories ==
=== Álava ===
← Summary of the 24 May 2015 General Assembly of Álava election results →
Parties and alliances	Popular vote			Seats	
Parties and alliances	Votes	%	±pp	Total	+/−
People's Party (PP)	35,335	21.99	−3.97	12	−4
Basque Nationalist Party (EAJ/PNV)	34,705	21.60	−2.12	13	±0
Basque Country Gather (EH Bildu)^{1}	32,716	20.36	−3.32	11	±0
We Can (Podemos/Ahal Dugu)	23,393	14.56	New	8	+8
Socialist Party of the Basque Country–Basque Country Left (PSE–EE (PSOE))	17,991	11.20	−5.11	5	−4
Winning (Irabazi)	5,953	3.70	New	1	+1
Citizens–Party of the Citizenry (C's)	4,982	3.10	New	1	+1
Joint Initiative (IKune)	1,764	1.10	New	0	±0
Union, Progress and Democracy (UPyD)	1,079	0.67	−1.13	0	±0
Vox (Vox)	118	0.07	New	0	±0
United Left–Greens (EB–B)	n/a	n/a	−4.09	0	−2
Blank ballots	2,653	1.65	−1.09		
Total	160,689			51	±0
Valid votes	160,689	98.40	+0.74		
Invalid votes	2,621	1.60	−0.74		
Votes cast / turnout	163,310	65.65	+2.02		
Abstentions	85,450	34.35	−2.02		
Registered voters	248,760				
Sources
Footnotes: ^{1} Basque Country Gather results are compared to the combined totals of Gather–Basque Solidarity–Alternative and Aralar in the 2011 election.

=== Biscay ===
← Summary of the 24 May 2015 General Assembly of Biscay election results →
Parties and alliances	Popular vote			Seats	
Parties and alliances	Votes	%	±pp	Total	+/−
Basque Nationalist Party (EAJ/PNV)	212,656	37.63	+0.41	23	+1
Basque Country Gather (EH Bildu)^{1}	106,575	18.86	−4.87	11	−1
We Can (Podemos/Ahal Dugu)	82,107	14.53	New	6	+6
Socialist Party of the Basque Country–Basque Country Left (PSE–EE (PSOE))	70,361	12.45	−4.23	7	−2
People's Party (PP)	46,354	8.20	−5.59	4	−4
Winning (Irabazi)	14,773	2.61	New	0	±0
Citizens–Party of the Citizenry (C's)	12,012	2.13	New	0	±0
Union, Progress and Democracy (UPyD)	3,389	0.60	+0.02	0	±0
Animalist Party Against Mistreatment of Animals (PACMA/ATTKAA)	3,377	0.60	New	0	±0
Vox–Family and Life Party (Vox–PFyV)	1,975	0.35	New	0	±0
Joint Initiative (IKune)	1,524	0.27	New	0	±0
Humanist Party (PH)	561	0.10	+0.08	0	±0
Basque Communists–Communist Party of the Peoples of Spain (EK–PCPE)	515	0.09	New	0	±0
Blank ballots	8,923	1.58	−0.64		
Total	565,102			51	±0
Valid votes	565,102	98.67	+0.08		
Invalid votes	7,644	1.33	−0.08		
Votes cast / turnout	572,746	62.57	−1.45		
Abstentions	342,598	37.43	+1.45		
Registered voters	915,344				
Sources
Footnotes: ^{1} Basque Country Gather results are compared to the combined totals of Gather–Basque Solidarity–Alternative and Aralar in the 2011 election.

=== Gipuzkoa ===
← Summary of the 24 May 2015 General Assembly of Gipuzkoa election results →
Parties and alliances	Popular vote			Seats	
Parties and alliances	Votes	%	±pp	Total	+/−
Basque Nationalist Party (EAJ/PNV)	112,918	31.57	+8.07	18	+4
Basque Country Gather (EH Bildu)^{1}	103,140	28.84	−10.79	17	−6
Socialist Party of the Basque Country–Basque Country Left (PSE–EE (PSOE))	59,080	16.52	−0.63	9	−1
We Can (Podemos/Ahal Dugu)	43,126	12.06	New	6	+6
People's Party (PP)	19,395	5.42	−4.61	1	−3
Winning (Irabazi)	8,422	2.35	New	0	±0
Citizens–Party of the Citizenry (C's)	5,262	1.47	New	0	±0
Union, Progress and Democracy (UPyD)	1,127	0.32	−0.40	0	±0
Blank ballots	5,203	1.45	−0.76		
Total	357,673			51	±0
Valid votes	357,673	99.10	+0.26		
Invalid votes	3,255	0.90	−0.26		
Votes cast / turnout	360,928	64.88	+2.15		
Abstentions	195,339	35.12	−2.15		
Registered voters	556,267				
Sources
Footnotes: ^{1} Basque Country Gather results are compared to the combined totals of Gather–Basque Solidarity–Alternative and Aralar in the 2011 election.

== Bibliography ==
- Ley 19/2011, de 5 de julio, por la que pasan a denominarse oficialmente "Araba/Álava", "Gipuzkoa" y "Bizkaia" las demarcaciones provinciales llamadas anteriormente "Álava", "Guipúzcoa" y "Vizcaya" (Law 19/2011). Official State Gazette (in Spanish). 5 July 2011. BOE-A-2011-11606.
