= Markel Olano =

Spanish Basque politician

Markel Olano Arrese
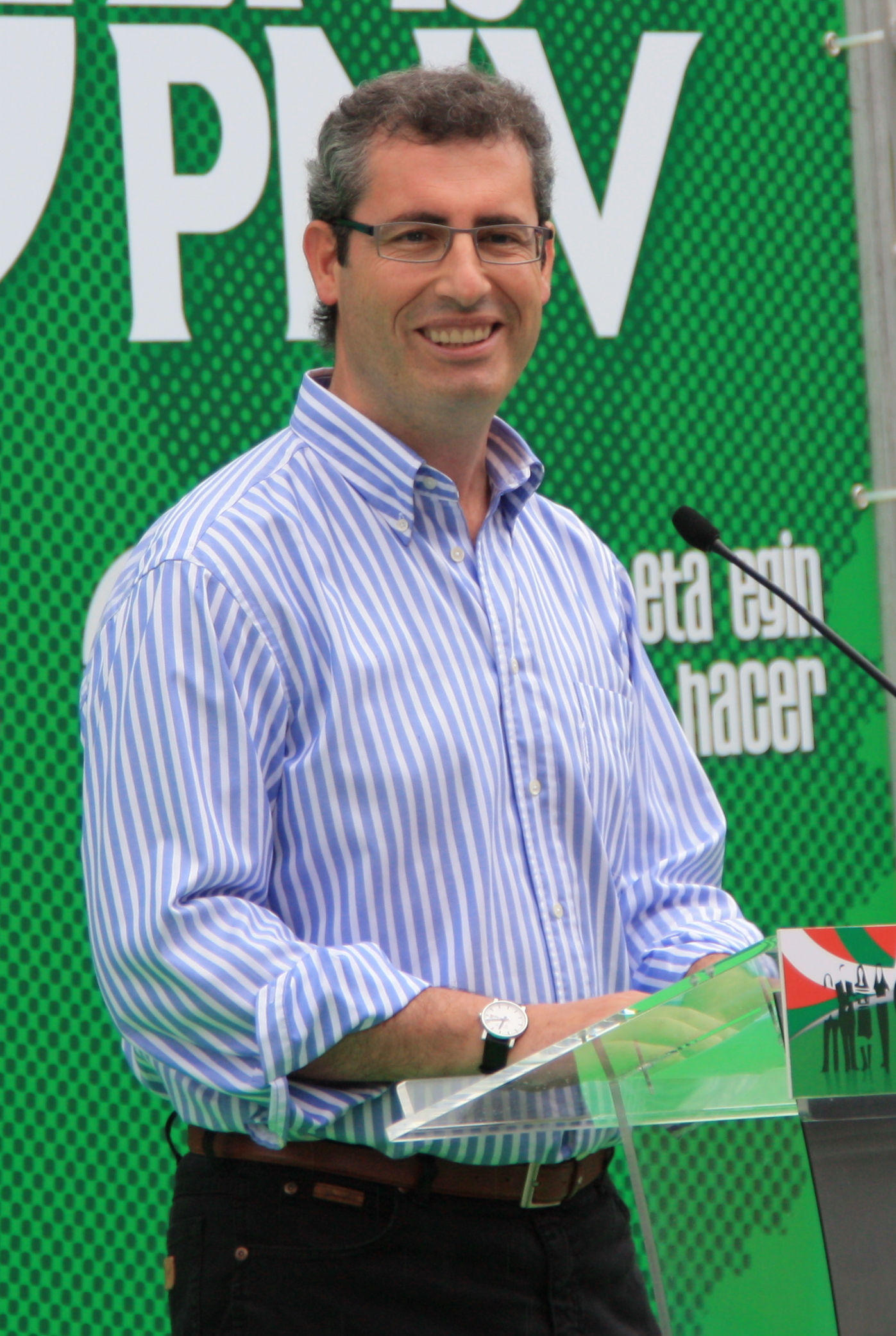

President of the Provincial Council of Gipuzkoa
- In office 2007–2011
- Preceded by: Joxe Joan González de Txabarri Miranda
- Succeeded by: Martín Garitano

President of the Provincial Council of Gipuzkoa
- In office 2015–2023
- Preceded by: Martín Garitano
- Succeeded by: Eider Mendoza

Member of the Provincial Council of Gipuzkoa
- In office 2007–2023

Personal details
- Born: 25 June 1965 (age 61) Beasain, Guipúzcoa, Spain
- Party: PNV
- Profession: Philosopher

Markel Olano Arrese (Beasain, June 2, 1965) is a Spanish politician, member of the Basque Nationalist Party and President of the Provincial Council of Gipuzkoa since June 6, 2007.

== Beginnings in politics ==
Olano began in politics at the age of fifteen in 1980 when he became a member of the youth organization, Euzko Gaztedi of the PNV (Basque Nationalist Party). His first years were spent in the internal structures of the EGI of Beasain and Goierri. While an active member in the EGI, he studied at the University of the Basque Country, graduating in Philosophy. He completed his higher education in doctorate studies in the same subject. Currently, he is writing his doctorate thesis.

== Political work in the PNV ==
During his militancy in the PNV, he held posts of varying responsibility. From 1996 to 2000, he was a member of the Gipuzko Buru Batzar (PNV provincial party executive for Gipuzkoa), with responsibility for the area of Euskara, Education and Culture. During this time, he was also the representative of the PNV on the Standing Committee on the Declaration of Lizarra-Garazi.

In 2000 he was appointed member of the Euzkadi Buru Batzar of the PNV which was at that time chaired by Xabier Arzalluz. He was entrusted with the area of Youth, Euskara, Culture and Sport. He was also given the added responsibility of the newly formed area of Information and Communication Technology.

== Provincial President ==
=== 18th Legislature (2007-2011) ===
Following the local elections of 2007, on June 6, 2007, his candidature received the greatest number of votes in the Juntas Generales (General Assembly) of Gipuzkoa and, as a result, on 12 of July the Provincial Council of Gipuzkoa was completed with the appointment of Markel Olano as its President.

The Provincial Council of Gipuzkoa Management Plan 2007-2011 sets out the general guidelines of the actions to be taken by Markel Olano for the 2007-2011 legislature.

=== 20th and 21st Legislature (2015-2023) ===
In 2015, Olano headed for the third time the list of the PNV, which received the most votes in the elections of May 24, 2015. On June 23, Olano was elected President of the Provincial Council with the votes of the PNV and the PSE-EE, with which he formed a coalition government.

He was reelected in the elections in May 2019 and continued the coalition with the PSE-EE.

He did not run for reelection in 2023. His successor as president of the provincial council was Eider Mendoza.
