= General Assembly of Gipuzkoa =

General Assemblies of Gipuzkoa Gipuzkoako Batzar Nagusiak Juntas Generales de Gipuzkoa
- XII Legislature

Type
- Type: Unicameral

History
- Founded: 14th century

Leadership
- President: Xabier Eceizabarrena since 2019

Structure
- Seats: 51
- Political groups: Government (24): EAJ-PNV (17); PSE-EE (7); Opposition (27): EH Bildu (22); PP (3); Elkarrekin (2)

Elections
- Last election: 28 May 2023

Meeting place
- Miramon Pasealekua, 164; 20014 San Sebastián; Gipuzkoa

Website
- www.bngipuzkoa.org

The General Assemblies of Gipuzkoa (Basque Gipuzkoako Batzar Nagusiak, Spanish Juntas Generales de Gipuzkoa) are the regional unicameral parliament of the Basque province of Gipuzkoa. Members are elected by universal suffrage for a term of 4 years. Last elections were held in 2023.

== Duties ==
- Adoption of foral laws.
- Election of the Deputy General of Gipuzkoa (regional president).
- Approval of budgets.
- Control and impulse the activity of the Province Government of Gipuzkoa.

== Presidents ==
List of presidents of the General Assembly since restoration of democracy and approval of the Basque Statute of Autonomy in 1979.

Legislature	President	Political party
I. (1979–1983)	Xabier Aizarna Azula	EAJ
II. (1983–1987)	Xabier Aizarna Azula	EAJ
III. (1987–1991)	Gurutz Antsola Larrañaga	EA
IV. (1991–1995)	Jon Esnal Alegria	EAJ
V. (1995–1999)	Esther Larrañaga Agirre	EAJ
VI. (1999–2003)	Iñaki Alkiza Laskibar	EA
VII. (2003–2007)	Leire Ereño Osa	EA
VIII. (2007–2011)	Rafaela Romero Pozo	PSE-EE
IX. (2011–2015)	Lohitzune Txarola Gurrutxaga	Bildu
X. (2015–2019)	Eider Mendoza Larrañaga	EAJ
XI. (2019-2023)	Xabier Ezeizabarrena Saenz	EAJ

== See also ==
- Juntas Generales
