= 2023 Basque foral elections =

Elections in the Spanish region of the Basque Country

Foral elections were held in the Basque Country on 28 May 2023 to elect the 12th General Assemblies of Álava, Biscay and Gipuzkoa. All 153 seats in the three General Assemblies were up for election. They were held concurrently with regional elections in twelve autonomous communities and local elections all across Spain.

== Overall ==
← Summary of the 28 May 2023 Basque foral election results
Parties and alliances	Popular vote			Seats	
Parties and alliances	Votes	%	±pp	Total	+/−
Basque Nationalist Party (EAJ/PNV)	348,484	34.43	−4.25	55	−7
Basque Country Gather (EH Bildu)	290,749	28.73	+4.95	51	+12
Socialist Party of the Basque Country–Basque Country Left (PSE–EE (PSOE))	163,758	16.18	−0.84	24	−3
People's Party (PP)	89,697	8.86	+1.67	15	+4
United We Can (Podemos, Ezker Anitza–IU, Berdeak Equo, AV)	70,388	6.96	−2.96	7	−7
Vox (Vox)	15,139	1.50	+0.80	1	+1
Stop (Stop)	4,750	0.47	New	0	±0
Blank Seats (EB/AZ)	4,589	0.45	+0.40	0	±0
Encartaciones Exists (Encartaciones Existe/Enkartazioak Bizirik)	1,826	0.18	New	0	±0
Free for the Basque Country (LxE)	1,674	0.17	+0.09	0	±0
Humanist Party (PH)	538	0.05	±0.00	0	±0
Blank ballots	18,548	1.81	+0.96		
Total	1,012,006			153	±0
Valid votes	1,012,006	98.52	−0.65		
Invalid votes	15,225	1.48	+0.65		
Votes cast / turnout	1,025,365	60.03	−5.92		
Abstentions	682,654	39.97	+5.92		
Registered voters	1,708,019				

Popular vote
EAJ/PNV	34.43%
EH Bildu	28.73%
PSE–EE (PSOE)	16.18%
PP	8.86%
E. Podemos	6.96%
Vox	1.53%
Others	1.32%
Blank ballots	1.81%

== Deputation control ==
The following table lists party control in the foral deputations. Gains for a party are highlighted in that party's colour.

Province	Population	Previous control	New control
Álava	334,412	Basque Nationalist Party (EAJ/PNV)	Basque Nationalist Party (EAJ/PNV)
Biscay	1,149,344	Basque Nationalist Party (EAJ/PNV)	Basque Nationalist Party (EAJ/PNV)
Gipuzkoa	724,418	Basque Nationalist Party (EAJ/PNV)	Basque Nationalist Party (EAJ/PNV)

== Historical territories ==
=== Álava ===
← Summary of the 28 May 2023 General Assembly of Álava election results
Parties and alliances	Popular vote			Seats	
Parties and alliances	Votes	%	±pp	Total	+/−
Basque Nationalist Party (EAJ/PNV)	38,467	25.90	−3.53	15	−2
Basque Country Gather (EH Bildu)	37,207	25.05	+4.09	14	+2
Socialist Party of the Basque Country–Basque Country Left (PSE–EE (PSOE))	27,506	18.52	−0.34	9	−1
People's Party (PP)	25,223	16.98	+2.01	9	+1
United We Can (Podemos, Ezker Anitza–IU, Berdeak Equo, AV)	10,349	6.97	−2.92	3	−1
Vox (Vox)	4,503	3.03	+1.63	1	+1
Free for the Basque Country (LxE)	1,674	1.13	+0.54	0	±0
Blank Seats (EB/AZ)	1,143	0.77	New	0	±0
Blank ballots	2,456	1.62	+0.75		
Total	148,528			51	±0
Valid votes	148,528	98.15	−0.81		
Invalid votes	2,800	1.85	+0.81		
Votes cast / turnout	151,328	60.09	−5.17		
Abstentions	100,521	39.91	+5.17		
Registered voters	251,849				

=== Biscay ===
← Summary of the 28 May 2023 General Assembly of Biscay election results
Parties and alliances	Popular vote			Seats	
Parties and alliances	Votes	%	±pp	Total	+/−
Basque Nationalist Party (EAJ/PNV)	204,557	38.28	−4.84	23	−2
Basque Country Gather (EH Bildu)	132,955	24.88	+5.19	15	+5
Socialist Party of the Basque Country–Basque Country Left (PSE–EE (PSOE))	84,656	15.84	−0.62	8	±0
People's Party (PP)	43,893	8.21	+1.60	3	+1
United We Can (Podemos, Ezker Anitza–IU, Berdeak Equo, AV)	38,756	7.25	−3.28	2	−4
Vox (Vox)	10,636	1.99	+1.06	0	±0
Stop (Stop)	2,896	0.54	New	0	±0
Encartaciones Exists (Encartaciones Existe/Enkartazioak Bizirik)	1,826	0.34	New	0	±0
Blank Seats (EB/AZ)	1,675	0.31	New	0	±0
Humanist Party (PH)	538	0.10	+0.01	0	±0
Blank ballots	10,152	1.88	+1.05		
Total	534,406			51	±0
Valid votes	534,406	98.46	−0.77		
Invalid votes	8,338	1.54	+0.77		
Votes cast / turnout	540,878	60.08	−5.63		
Abstentions	359,428	39.92	+5.63		
Registered voters	900,306				

=== Gipuzkoa ===
← Summary of the 28 May 2023 General Assembly of Gipuzkoa election results
Parties and alliances	Popular vote			Seats	
Parties and alliances	Votes	%	±pp	Total	+/−
Basque Country Gather (EH Bildu)	120,587	36.64	+5.02	22	+5
Basque Nationalist Party (EAJ/PNV)	105,460	32.05	−3.54	17	−3
Socialist Party of the Basque Country–Basque Country Left (PSE–EE (PSOE))	51,596	15.68	−1.42	7	−2
United We Can (Podemos, Ezker Anitza–IU, Berdeak Equo, AV)	21,283	6.47	−2.47	2	−2
People's Party (PP)	20,581	6.25	+1.55	3	+2
Stop (Stop)	1,854	0.56	New	0	±0
Blank Seats (EB/AZ)	1,771	0.54	+0.38	0	±0
Blank ballots	5,940	1.78	+0.91		
Total	329,072			51	±0
Valid votes	329,072	98.77	−0.39		
Invalid votes	4,087	1.23	+0.39		
Votes cast / turnout	333,159	59.94	−6.71		
Abstentions	222,705	40.06	+6.71		
Registered voters	555,864				
