= Richar Vaquero =

Basque social educator, educational psychologist and politician

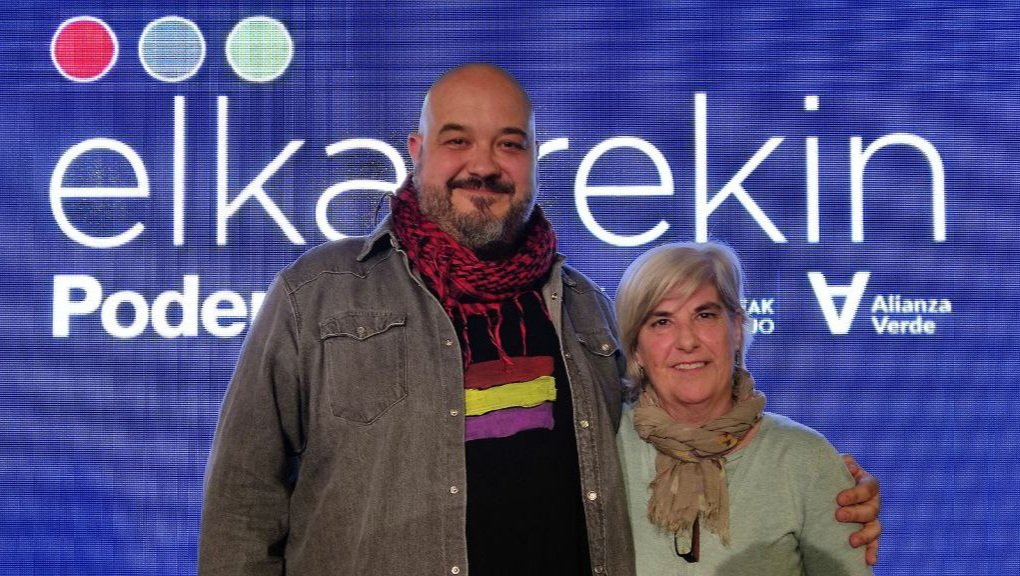
- Richar Vaquero and Inma Arias in 2023

General Coordinator of Podemos Euskadi
- Incumbent
- Assumed office 14 December 2024
- Preceded by: Pilar Garrido

Deputy of the General Assemblies of Biscay
- Incumbent
- Assumed office 28 June 2023
- President: Elixabete Etxanobe
- Parliamentary group: Podemos-United Left-Greens Equo-Green Alliance Group

General Secretary of Podemos Sestao
- In office 2015–2021
- Preceded by: office established
- Succeeded by: Pablo Fernández Mezo

Personal details
- Born: Ricardo Vaquero Moreno; 27 May 1974 (age 52) Erandio, Basque Country, Spain
- Party: Podemos Euskadi
- Education: University of the Basque Country
- Occupation: Social educator, educational psychologist and politician

Ricardo Vaquero Moreno (born in Erandio on 27 May 1974), known as Richar Vaquero, is a Basque social educator, educational psychologist and politician.

He is the current general coordinator of Podemos Euskadi and also a deputy of the General Assemblies of Biscay (legislature of Biscay).

Previously he served as coordinator and spokesperson for the circles of Biscay (2021-2023) and before that as general secretary of Podemos Sestao (2015-2021). He has also been a member of the executive committee of the party Podemos Euskadi (2020-2024).

== Biography and career ==
He was born in Erandio in 1974. He studied a diploma in teaching at the University of the Basque Country. Later he also studied a licenciate degree in psychopedagogy at the University of the Basque Country, which he finished with a diploma of research proficiency. After that, he completed a master's degree in pedagogy at the University of the Basque Country.

He is a social educator and educational psychologist. He has worked in the Berriztu association for more than twenty years, in areas related to the social reintegration of minors and juvenile justice. He is currently director of the Urgozo juvenile justice educational center (belonging to Berriztu).

== Political career ==
Part of the Podemos party since its inception around 2014, he collaborated in its initial creation in the municipality of Sestao. He collaborated in the initial creation of Podemos Sestao, helping to create the electoral platform Bai Ahal Da-Sí Se Puede (Sestao)-BAD-SSP (Yes We Can Sestao), along with other people such as Inma Arias, Soraya Pereira, Montserrat Roca, Isidoro Temprano or Ángela Sevilla.

In the 2015 Spanish local elections, he was a candidate for councillor for the electoral platform Bai Ahal Da-Sí Se Puede (Sestao)-BAD-SSP, candidacies promoted by Podemos, with Soraya Pereira as a candidate for Mayor of Sestao. Although he did not obtain a seat on the City Council of Sestao as a councillor.

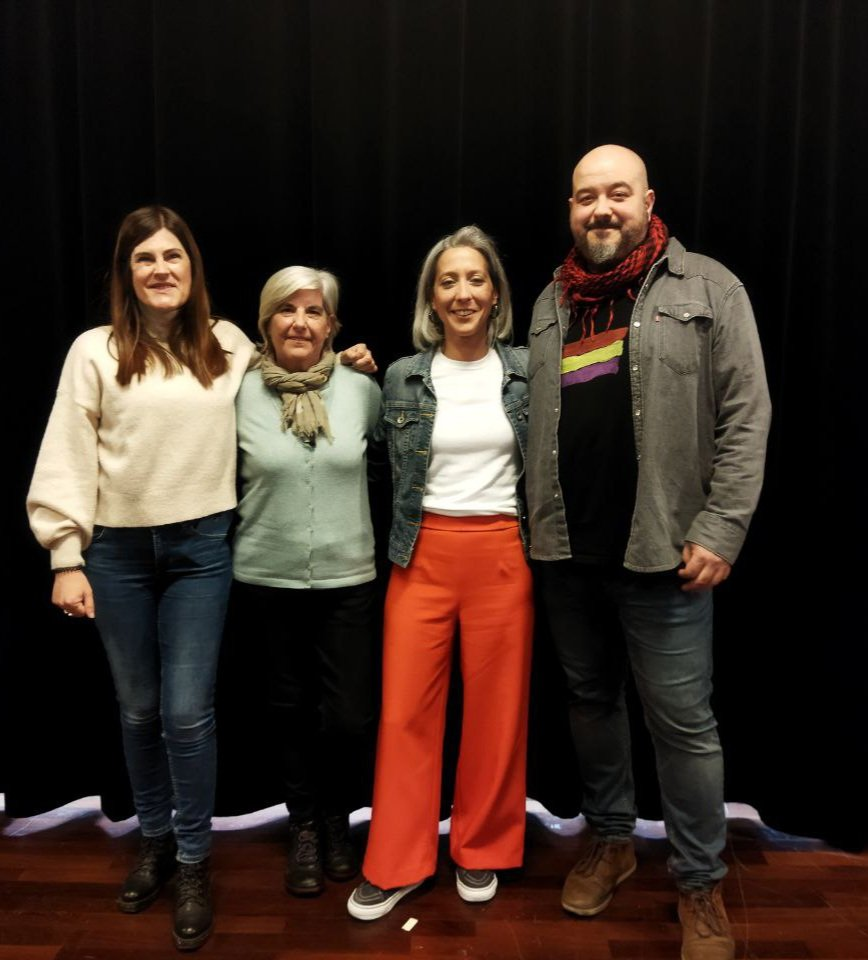
Miren Gorrotxategi, Inma Arias, Eneritz de Madariaga and Richar Vaquero (Bilbao, 2023).

In the 2019 Spanish local elections, Vaquero repeated as a candidate for councillor of the Sestao city council for the electoral alliance Elkarrekin Podemos Sestao (Podemos, Ezker Anitza-IU and Greens Equo), with Soraya Pereira as a candidate for Mayor of Sestao. Although he did not obtain a seat in the city council either.

He was elected general secretary of Podemos Sestao in 2015. In 2019, he was again elected general secretary of Podemos Sestao. In 2021, he was elected coordinator of Vizcaya circles and member of the citizen council of Podemos Euskadi (committee executive), leaving the general secretary of Podemos Sestao and being succeeded by Pablo Fernández Mezo.

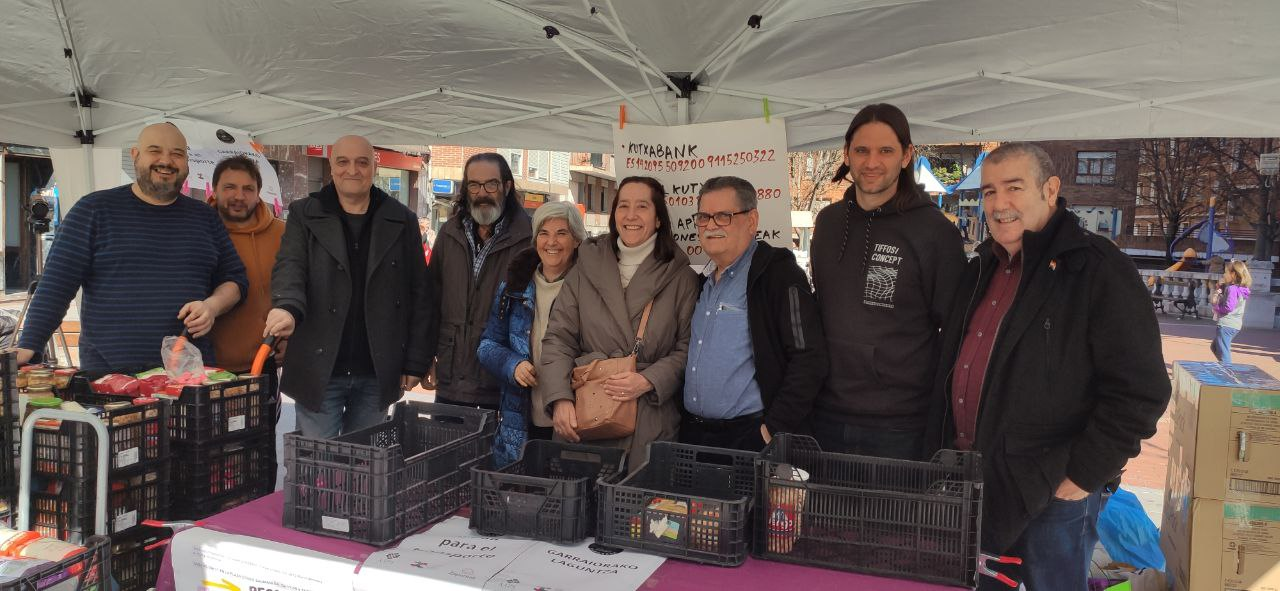
Members of Podemos Sestao together with members of the NGO "Zaporeak" collecting food for refugees affected by the 2023 Turkey–Syria earthquakes (Sestao, 11 February 2023). Members of Podemos Sestao: Richar Vaquero, Isidoro Temprano, Pablo Fernández, Inma Arias, Montserrat Roca and Óscar Albalat.

In the 2023 Basque foral elections, he was the head of the list for the General Assemblies of Biscay, for the constituency of Enkarterriak-Las Encartaciones, for the electoral alliance Elkarrekin Bizkaia (Podemos, Ezker Anitza-IU, Greens Equo and Green Alliance), and with Eneritz de Madariaga as a candidate for General Deputy of Bizkaia. He obtained a seat as a deputy of the regional Parliament of Biscay, during the XII Legislature.

Vaquero was elected member of the Bureau of the Biscayan parliament, as second secretary, with Ana Otadui as speaker of the General Assemblies of Biscay.

In 2024, in the 2024 Basque regional elections, Vaquero was a candidate for deputy of the Basque Parliament for the Biscay constituency for the electoral alliance Elkarrekin Podemos (Podemos Euskadi and Green Alliance), with Miren Gorrotxategi as the head of the list and candidate for prime minister of the Basque Government.

At the beginning of 2024, in relation to the 2024 Basque regional elections, Vaquero was one of the signatories of the manifesto Elkarrekin Sumar Bai (in Basque, Together Unite Yes) in favour of Podemos Euskadi and Sumar Mugimendua standing together in electoral coalition on a unitary list for the 2024 Basque elections, a manifesto that had more than five hundred signatories from the political, cultural and social spheres such as Vaquero himself, Eneritz de Madariaga, Guillermo Presa, Iker Mojón, Casimiro Castaño, Israel Escalante, Eder García López, Alberto Bezunartea, Pablo Fernández Mezo, Antonio Duplá, Koldo Unceta, Lourdes Oñederra, Imanol Zubero, Estíbaliz de Miguel Calvo, Marije Goikoetxea, Ander Gutiérrez-Solana, Idoye Zabala, Miguel Aranburuzabala, Ane Sufrate Abasolo or Ekaitz Cancela.

=== General coordinator of Podemos Euskadi ===
At the end of 2024, in the internal elections of the Podemos Euskadi political party, Vaquero presented his candidacy for general coordinator, against the other candidacy presented by Miren Echeveste. On the list headed by Vaquero he was accompanied by Maite Gartzia, Mariví Eizaguirre, Inés Unzaga, Alfonso Arroyo and Soraya Pereira. Vaquero's candidacy obtained 308 endorsements, compared to the 303 endorsements obtained by Echeveste's candidacy. Finally, Vaquero's candidacy was the winner, obtaining 46.5% of the votes, while Echeveste's obtained 44.6% of the votes. With this, Vaquero became the new general coordinator of Podemos Euskadi, succeeding Pilar Garrido at the head of the party. In his appearance after the election result, Vaquero declared that his objective as the new general coordinator of the party was to "recover militancy and strength in the streets".

== Personal life ==
He currently lives in Sestao. He is married to politician Soraya Pereira. They have two daughters.

== See also ==
- Inma Arias
