= Podemos Euskadi =

Basque political party

Podemos Basque Country Podemos Euskadi-Ahal Dugu Euskadi
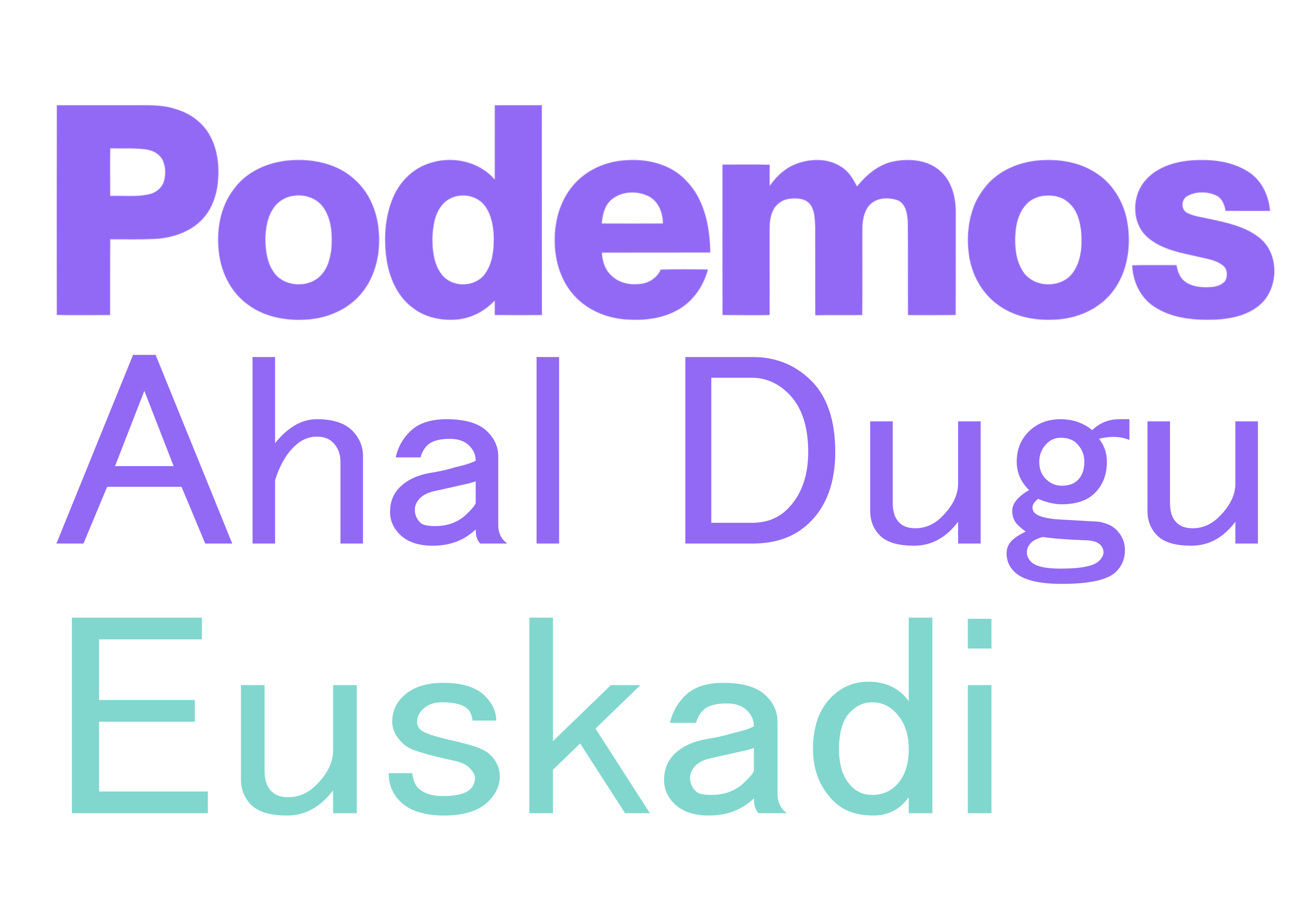
- General Coordinator: Richar Vaquero
- Spokesperson in the Basque Parliament: None
- Founded: 2014
- Headquarters: C/ Manuel Iradier Kalea, 40; 01005, Vitoria-Gasteiz
- Ideology: Democratic socialism; Plurinationalism; Federalism; Direct democracy; Left-wing populism
- Political position: Left-wing to far-left
- National affiliation: Podemos
- Regional affiliation: Elkarrekin Podemos (2020–2024)
- Colours: Purple
- Congress of Deputies (2023–2027): 0 / 18
- Spanish Senate (2023–2027): 0 / 12
- Basque Parliament (2024–2028): 0 / 75
- Juntas Generales (2023–2027): 7 / 153
- Local government (2023–2027): 46 / 2,661

Website
- podemos.eus

Podemos Euskadi-Ahal Dugu Euskadi (Spanish: [poˈðemos], translated in English as "Basque Country We Can") is a left-wing to far-left political party in the Basque Autonomous Community in Spain. It is the Basque federation of the Spanish state-level ("national level") political party Podemos.

The political party Podemos Euskadi has a present (seats) in the Basque Parliament, in the legislatures of Biscay, Gipuzkoa and Álava (General Assemblies) and in different municipalities of the Basque Autonomous Community, including the three Basque capitals (Bilbao, Donostia and Vitoria-Gasteiz). It also had a presence in the Congress of Deputies (2015–2023) and in the Senate of Spain (2015–2019).

The current general coordinator is Richar Vaquero since 2024.

The political party is settled and rooted in Euskadi, with a Basqueist and pro-Basque position. The party has positioned itself and is publicly positioning itself in favor of the right to decide and of a self-determination referendum, agreed with the State, following the models of Scotland or Quebec. In the words of Miren Gorrotxategi, "we defend the referendum as a democratic instrument".

On the other hand, Podemos Euskadi has also been pro-Basque language, supporting the educational immersion model in Basque, in favor of making totally free the learning of the Basque or in favor of initiatives to boost the Basque.

This party (and the political space it represents) is usually called "Confederal Left", due to its defense of the right to decide, the self-determination referendum (Canadian model), the sovereignty of the Basque Country or the "national character" of the Basque Country (the "reality made up of social, linguistic, historical, economic and cultural ties" that make up the Basque Country or "Euskal Herria").

Podemos Euskadi is a member of The Left in the European Parliament – GUE/NGL.

== History ==
The organization of the party arises from the documents approved in the third State Citizen Assembly of Podemos, also known as Vistalegre III, in 2020.1 It consists of:

- Autonomous Citizen Assembly.
- Autonomous Citizen Council.
- Autonomous Coordination.
- Autonomous Coordination Council.
- Autonomous Democratic Guarantees Commission.

Furthermore, the representativeness of the circles (the basis of the party's militancy) occurs through the council of circles, the network of circles or their presence in the Autonomous Citizen Council.

== General Secretary ==
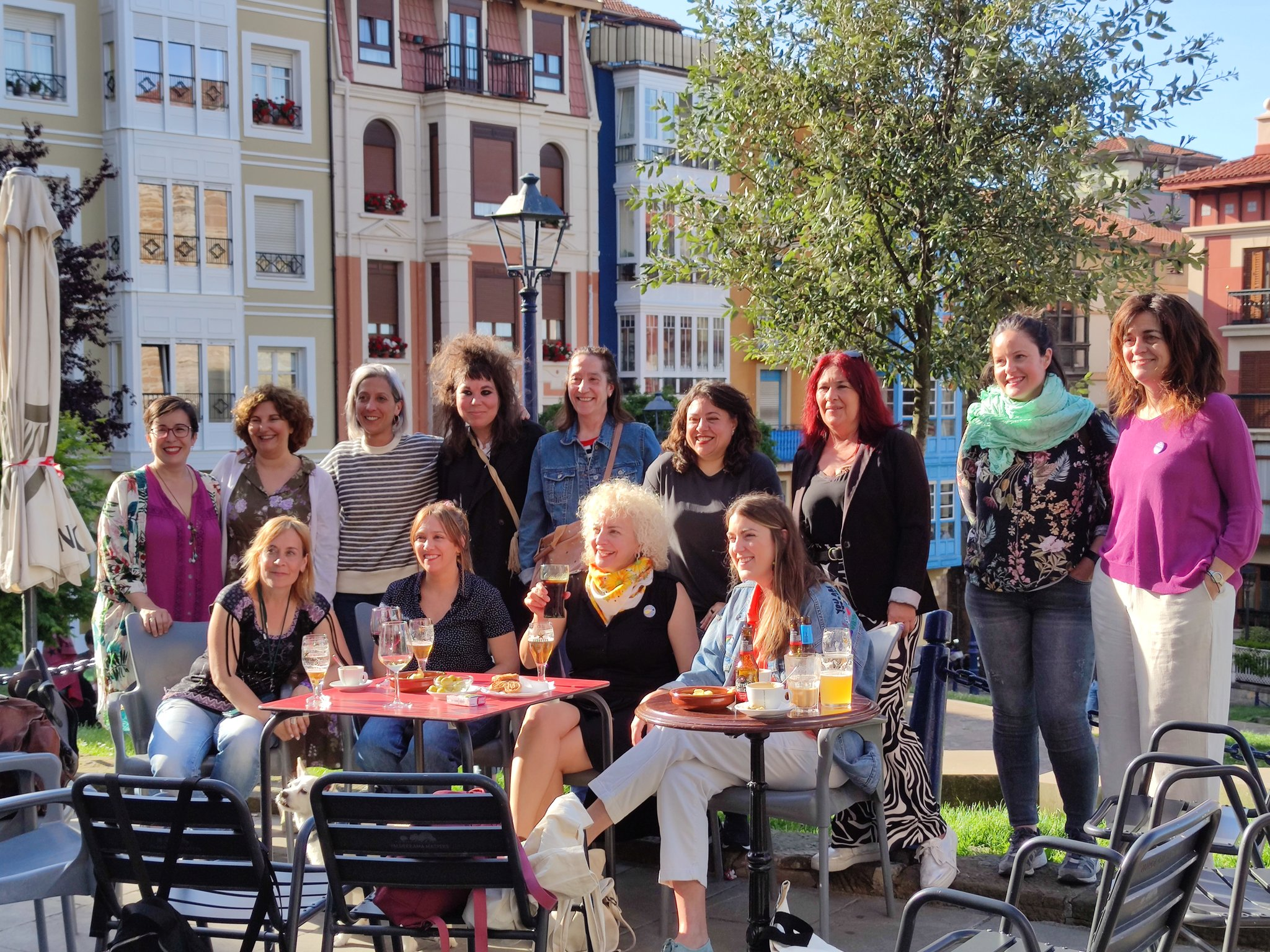
Feminist Meeting Podemos Euskadi (Santurtzi, 2023). Among others, Paula Amieva, Pilar Garrido, Eneritz de Madariaga, Natalia Rey, Montserrat Roca, Soraya Pereira, Ángela Sevilla, Mariví Eizaguirre, Ainhoa Lopera, Isabel González and Alba García (missing in the photo, Inés Unzaga).

Roberto Uriarte was the first general secretary of Podemos Euskadi (2015–2016). He was later succeeded by Nagua Alba (2016–2017). In 2017, Lander Martínez assumed the general secretary of Podemos Euskadi.

In 2020, Pilar Garrido became the general secretary of Podemos Euskadi, succeeding Lander Martínez. Martínez, close to Iñigo Errejón and the so-called "errejonista" sector (which led to the creation of Más País), resigned after losing the party primaries along with his team's candidate Rosa Martínez, against the so-called "sector" pablista" headed by Miren Gorrotxategi and Pilar Garrido. Finally Rosa Martínez left the party, and Lander Martínez ended up in the political party Movimiento Sumar and being part of the hard core of Yolanda Díaz and Iñigo Errejón.

General secretary of Podemos Euskadi:

- Roberto Uriarte (2015–2016)
- Nagua Alba (2016–2017)
- Lander Martínez (2017–2020)
- Pilar Garrido (2020-)
- Richar Vaquero (2024-)

== Spokespersons in parliaments ==
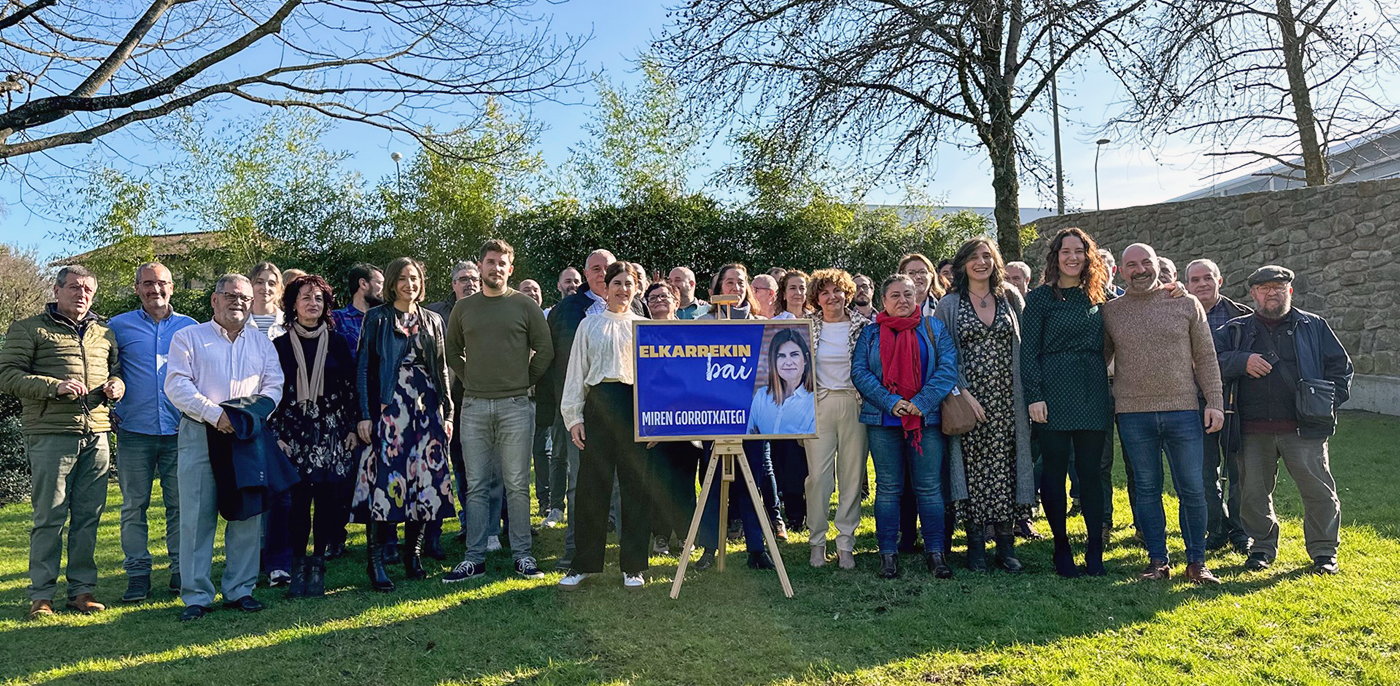
Public presentation of Miren Gorrotxategi's candidacy for the primary elections of Podemos Euskadi ("Elkarrekin Bai" candidacy), for the 2024 Basque Parliament elections. Durango, 2024. Among others, the candidates for member of the Basque Parliament (MBP) of the candidacy headed by Gorrotxategi, Oihane Mestraitua, Sabina Méndez, Garbiñe Ruiz, Alfonso Arroyo, David Soto, Miren Gorrotxategi, Ander Jiménez, Richar Vaquero, Montserrat Roca, Pilar Garrido, Soraya Pereira, Miren Echeveste, Arkaitz Gorritxo.

The leaders and spokespersons of the parliamentary groups in the different institutions in which the party has institutional representation (seats) are

- Miren Gorrotxategi (Basque Parliament)
- Eneritz de Madariaga (General Assembly of Biscay)
- Miren Echeveste (General Assembly of Gipuzkoa)
- David Rodríguez (General Assembly of Álava)
- Ana Viñals (Bilbao City Council)
- Víctor Lasa (Donostia-San Sebastián City Council)
- Garbiñe Ruiz (Vitoria-Gasteiz City Council)

== Electoral alliances ==
Podemos Euskadi is a member of the following electoral coalitions (union with other parties for elections):

- Unidas Podemos - electoral coalition for the April 2019 Spanish general election
- Unidas Podemos - electoral coalition for the November 2019 Spanish general election
- Elkarrekin Podemos - electoral coalition for the 2020 Basque Parliament elections
- Sumar (coalition) - electoral coalition for the 2023 Spanish general elections
- Elkarrekin Podemos - electoral coalition for the 2024 Basque Parliament elections

== Electoral performance ==
=== Basque Parliament ===
Basque Parliament
Election	Leading candidate	Electoral list	Votes	%	Seats	+/–	Government
2016	Pilar Zabala Artano	Elkarrekin Podemos	157,334	14.86 (#3)	11 / 75	11	Opposition
2020	Miren Gorrotxategi	Elkarrekin Podemos	72,113	8.05 (#4)	6 / 75	5	Opposition
2024	Miren Gorrotxategi	None	23,888	2.23 (#6)	0 / 75	6	No seats

=== Spanish parliament (Cortes Generales) ===
Cortes Generales
Election		Congress of Deputies				Senate	
Election	Electoral alliance	Votes	%	Seats	+/–	Seats	+/–
2015	Podemos	316,441	25.97 (#2)	5 / 18	5	5 / 12	5
2016	Unidas Podemos	333,730	29.05 (#1)	6 / 18	1	6 / 12	1
Apr. 2019	Unidas Podemos	223,245	17.57 (#3)	4 / 18	2	0 / 12	6
Nov. 2019	Unidas Podemos	182,674	15.51 (#4)	3 / 18	1	0 / 12	0
2023	Sumar	127,031	11.07 (#4)	0 / 18	3	0 / 12	0

== See also ==
- Miren Gorrotxategi
- Alba García Martín
