= Pilar Garrido Gutiérrez =

Spanish jurist, university professor, and politician (born 1966)

Pilar Garrido
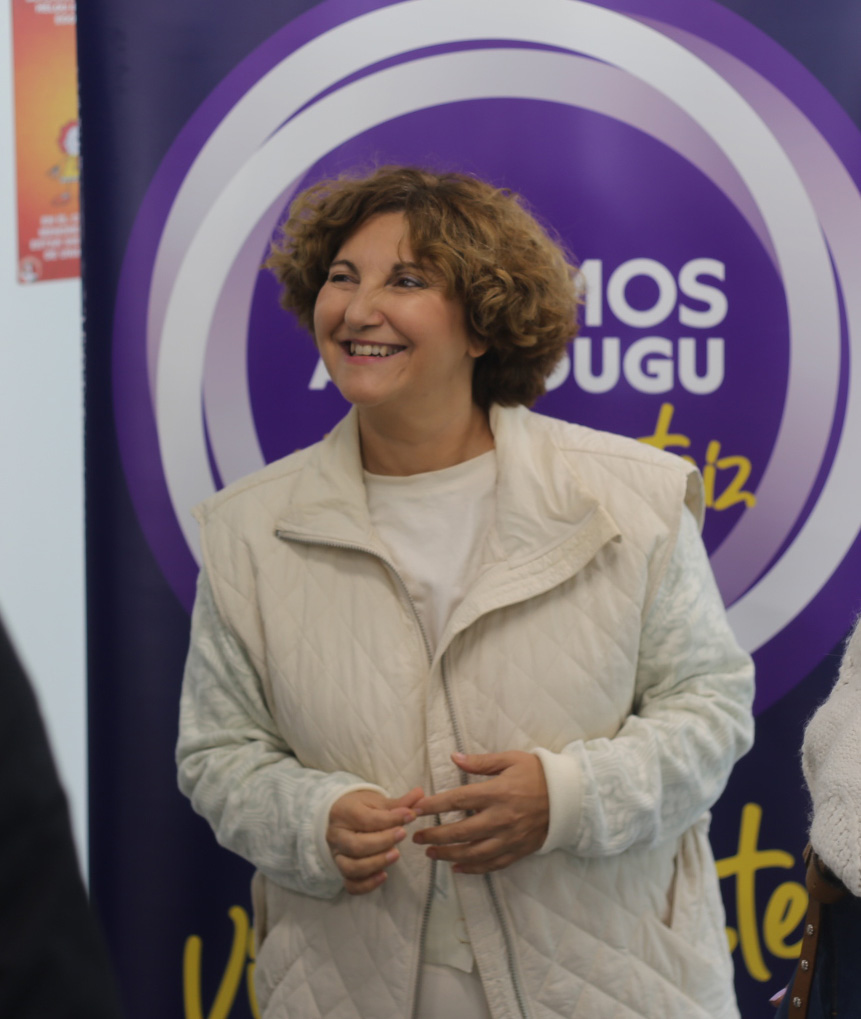
- Born: María Pilar Garrido Gutiérrez; April 15, 1966 (age 60); Badajoz, Extremadura, Spain
- Education: University of the Basque Country (PhD in Constitutional Law, 2012)
- Occupations: Jurist; University professor; Politician
- Years active: 2015–present
- Office: General Coordinator of Podemos Euskadi (2020–2024); Member of the Congress of Deputies (2019–2023); Senator (2015–2019)
- Political party: Podemos

María Pilar Garrido Gutiérrez (born 15 April 1966) is a Spanish jurist, university professor, and politician. She served as General Coordinator of Podemos Euskadi from 2020 to 2024. She previously served as a member of the Congress of Deputies representing Gipuzkoa for the Unidas Podemos coalition (2019–2023) and as a Senator for Podemos (2015–2019).

== Early life and education ==
Garrido was born in Badajoz, Extremadura, on 15 April 1966. She grew up in Deba, Gipuzkoa, in the Basque Country.

She earned a PhD in Constitutional Law from the University of the Basque Country in 2012, with her doctoral thesis titled "El derecho a la vivienda entre constitución y mercado" (The right to housing between constitution and market), directed by Miguel Ángel García Herrera.

== Academic career ==
Garrido is a Professor of Constitutional and Autonomous Law at the University of the Basque Country, where she has been affiliated throughout her academic career.

== Political career ==
=== Early political involvement ===
Before entering electoral politics, Garrido served as Director of Housing for the Basque Government during the tenure of Javier Madrazo (Ezker Batua-Berdeak) as the relevant minister.

=== Senate (2015–2019) ===
In the 2016 Spanish general election, Garrido was elected as a Senator representing Gipuzkoa for Podemos during the XII Legislature of Spain. She served as spokesperson for the Confederal Group UP-EC-EM in the Senate.

=== Congress of Deputies (2019–2023) ===
In the April 2019 Spanish general election, Garrido was elected to the Congress of Deputies representing Gipuzkoa for the Unidas Podemos coalition. She served as Secretary of Social Policies for Podemos at the national level during her tenure.

In the 2023 Spanish general election, she was a candidate for the Sumar coalition in Gipuzkoa but did not obtain a seat.

=== Leadership of Podemos Euskadi ===
In 2020, Garrido became General Coordinator of Podemos Euskadi after winning the party's primary elections, succeeding Lander Martínez. Her victory represented the "Pabloist" sector of the party, alongside Miren Gorrotxategi, against the "Errejónist" sector led by Martínez and Rosa Martínez.

During her leadership, she navigated internal party divisions and represented Podemos Euskadi in various regional and national political contexts. In October 2024, she announced that she would not seek re-election as General Coordinator, and was succeeded by Richar Vaquero.

== Personal life ==
Garrido currently resides in San Sebastián, Gipuzkoa. She is a member of the State Citizens' Council of Podemos at the national level.
