= Inma Arias =

Basque journalist and politician

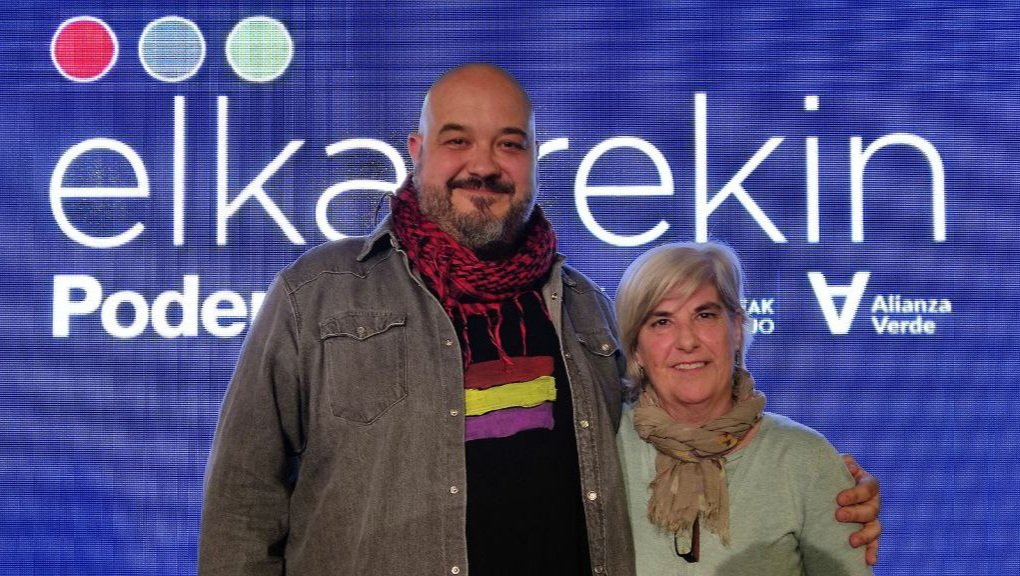
- Richar Vaquero and Inma Arias in 2023

Leader and spokesperson of the Podemos-United Left-Greens Equo-Green Alliance Group in the Sestao City Council
- Incumbent
- Assumed office 2020

Councillor of the Sestao City Council
- Incumbent
- Assumed office 2015
- President: Ainhoa Basabe
- Parliamentary group: Podemos-United Left-Greens Equo-Green Alliance Group

Personal details
- Born: Inmaculada Arias Ergueta; 15 March 1961 (age 65) Sestao, Basque Country, Spain
- Party: Podemos Euskadi
- Education: University of the Basque Country
- Occupation: Journalist and politician

Inmaculada Arias Ergueta (born in Sestao on 15 March 1961) is a Basque journalist and politician.

She is currently member of the Sestao City Council as councillor, since 2015, and she also serves as the leader and spokesperson of the Podemos-Ezker Anitza-IU-Greens Equo-Green Alliance Group in the Sestao City Council since 2020.

== Biography ==
Inma Arias was born in Sestao. She studied secondary education at the IES Ángela Figuera BHI institute in Sestao. He studied a licenciate degree in information sciences at the University of the Basque Country.

She has worked as a journalist in the media and press, such as in the newspaper El Correo. She participated in the creation and editing of the local newspaper "Begira" and the free radio network "Karibe Irratia", during the eighties and nineties.

== Political career ==
Part of the Podemos party since its inception around 2014, he collaborated in its initial creation in the municipality of Sestao. He collaborated in the initial creation of Podemos Sestao, helping to create the electoral platform Bai Ahal Da-Sí Se Puede (Sestao)-BAD-SSP (Yes We Can Sestao), along with other people such as Richar Vaquero, Soraya Pereira, Montserrat Roca, Isidoro Temprano or Ángela Sevilla.

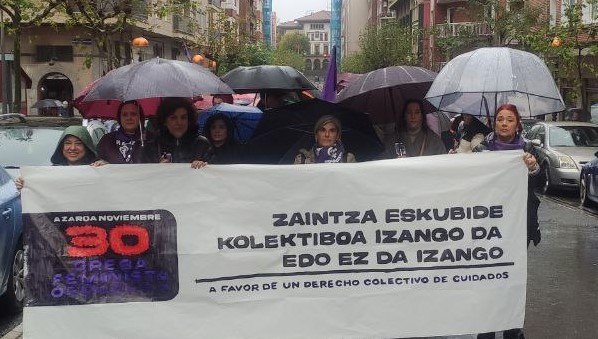
General Feminist Strike on 30 November 2023 in Sestao (in the photo, Soraya Pereira, Inma Arias, Montserrat Roca and Ángela Sevilla).

In the 2015 Spanish local elections, he was a candidate for councillor for the electoral platform Bai Ahal Da-Sí Se Puede (Sestao)-BAD-SSP, candidacies promoted by Podemos, with Soraya Pereira as a candidate for Mayor of Sestao. She was elected councillor of the Sestao city council. In the 2015 Basque foral elections, Arias was a candidate for member of the General Assemblies of Biscay, for the constituency of Enkarterriak-Las Encartaciones, although she did not obtain a seat in the lesgilature of Biscay.

In the 2019 Spanish local elections, she repeated as a candidate for councillor of the Sestao city council for the electoral alliance Elkarrekin Podemos Sestao (Podemos, Ezker Anitza-IU and Greens Equo), as second on the list, with Soraya Pereira as a candidate for Mayor of Sestao. She was elected again as a councillor.

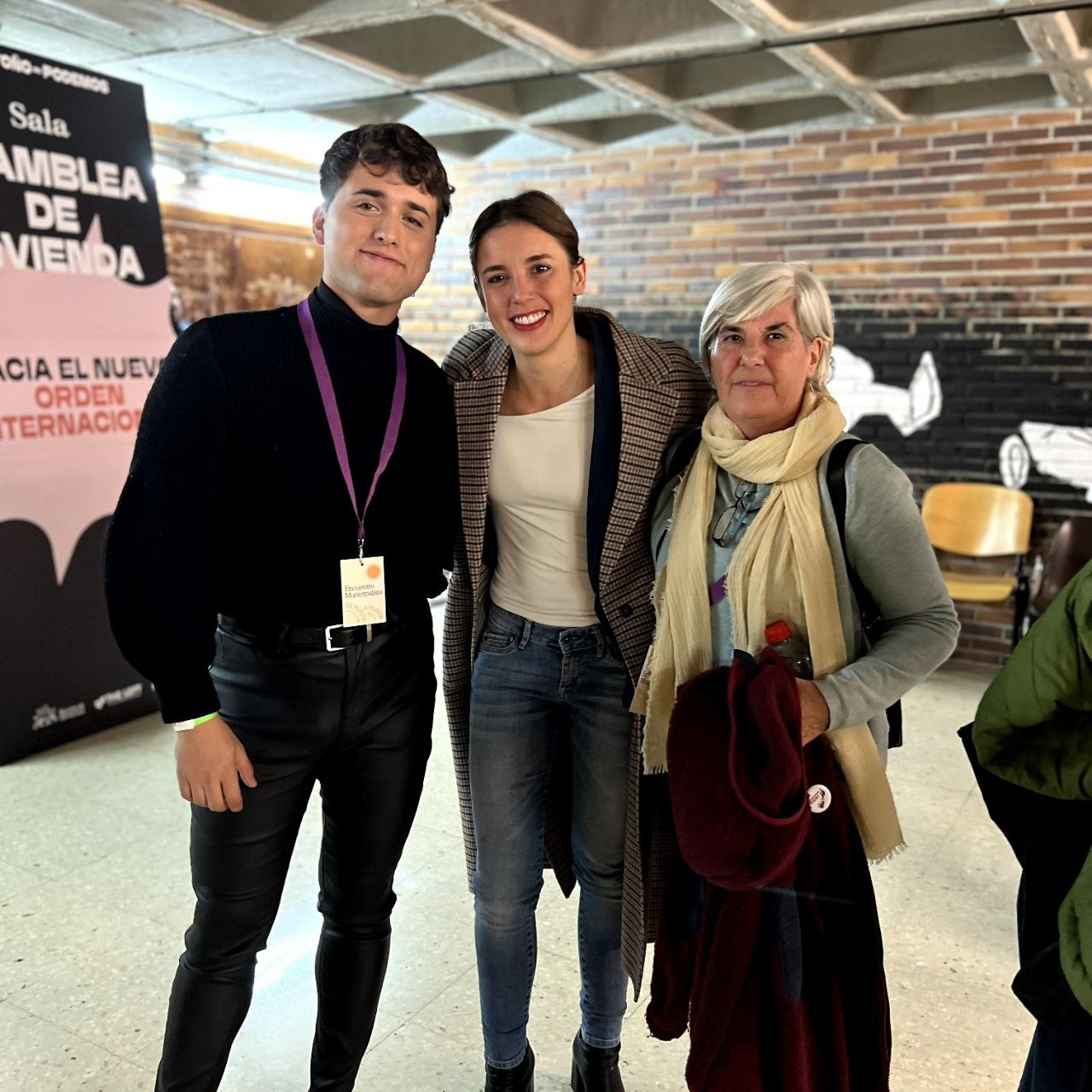
Inma Arias, Iker Mojón and Irene Montero

In 2020, she became the leader and spokesperson for the Podemos-Ezker Anitza-IU-Greens Equo-Green Alliance Group in the Sestao City Council, succeeding Soraya Pereira.

In the 2023 Spanish local elections, Arias was the head of the list and candidate for Mayor of Sestao, for the electoral alliance Elkarrekin Sestao (Podemos, Ezker Anitza-IU, Greens Equo and Green Alliance). She was elected councillor and was again at the head of the Municipal Group, as leader and spokesperson.

He also usually collaborates in the political gatherings of TeleBilbao (TB).

== Personal life ==
He currently lives in Sestao. Her brother is Pedro Luis Arias, full professor, deputy minister of the Basque Government and spokesperson of Gesto por la Paz.

== See also ==
- Richar Vaquero
