= Rosa Martinez =

Rosa Martínez may refer to:

- Rosa Martínez (activist) (1952–2022), American mother of an HIV-infected child
- Rosa Martínez (curator) (born 1955), Spanish art curator and critic
- Rosa Martínez (politician) (born 1975), Spanish politician

== See also ==
- Rosa Maria Martinez (disambiguation)
