= Miren Gorrotxategi =

Spanish lawyer, jurist, university teacher and politician

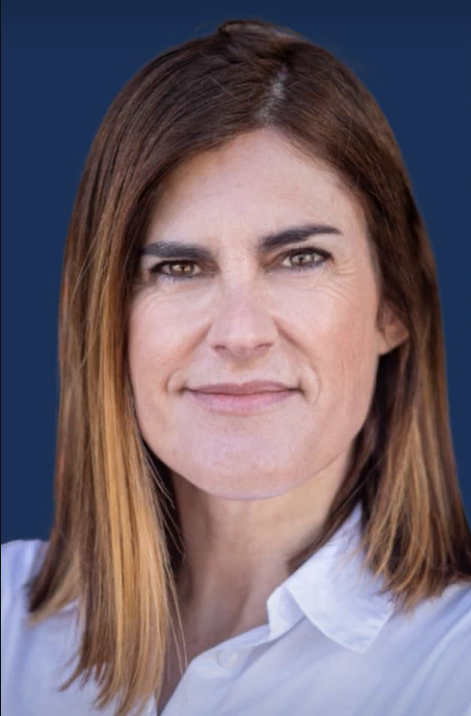
- Miren Gorrotxategi in 2023

Spokesperson of the Elkarrekin Podemos-Ezker Anitza Group in the Basque Parliament
- In office 3 August 2020 – 21 April 2024
- Preceded by: Lander Martínez
- Succeeded by: Office abolished

Member of the Basque Parliament
- In office 3 August 2020 – 21 April 2024
- Constituency: Biscay

Member of the Congress of Deputies
- In office 21 May 2019 – 24 September 2019
- Constituency: Biscay

Member of the Senate of Spain
- In office 20 December 2015 – 4 March 2019
- Constituency: Biscay

Personal details
- Born: Miren Edurne Gorrotxategi Azurmendi; 18 September 1967 (age 59) Abadiño, Basque Country, Spain
- Party: Podemos Euskadi (2014–present)
- Children: 2
- Education: University of the Basque Country
- Occupation: Lawyer, jurist, university teacher

Miren Edurne Gorrotxategi Azurmendi (born 18 September 1967) is a Basque lawyer, jurist, university teacher and former politician from Spain. She is a university teacher of Constitutional Law at the University of the Basque Country.

She served in the Senate (2016–2019) and the Congress of Deputies (May 2019–September 2019). She was a member of the Basque Parliament and spokesperson of the Elkarrekin Podemos-Ezker Anitza Parliamentary Group in the Basque Parliament from 2020 to 2024.

== Biography ==
Gorrotxategi was born in Abadiño, Biscay. She graduated with a law degree from the University of the Basque Country in 1991 and later got a postgraduate diploma in environmental law.

She began as a university teacher, teaching classes there in constitutional law and history of political thought in 1992. She taught in the Basque language.

== Political career ==
Gorrotxategi was elected to the Senate in the 2015 Spanish general election, receiving 8.11% of the vote and taking the last of four seats for the Biscay constituency. In the April 2019 Spanish general election, she was elected to the Congress of Deputies by the same constituency, where she was running as number two on Podemos's list behind Roberto Uriarte. She was one of seven Podemos deputies to lose their seats in the November 2019 election.

=== Candidate for President of the Government (2020) ===
In February 2020, Gorrotxategi was elected as Podemos Euskadi's candidate for President of the Government (Lehendakari) in the 2020 Basque regional election, leading the electoral alliance Elkarrekin Podemos (Podemos Euskadi, United Left, Greens Equo and Green Aliance). She defeated the official candidate Rosa Martínez. Her selection caused the party's entire board in the region to resign, and for Greens Equo to leave the Elkarrekin Podemos coalition and run alone.

In the 2020 Basque regional election, she was elected deputy of the Basque Parliament. She served as the leader and spokesperson of the Podemos-United Left-Greens Equo-Green Alliance Parliamentary Group in the parliament.

=== Candidate for President of the Government (2024) ===
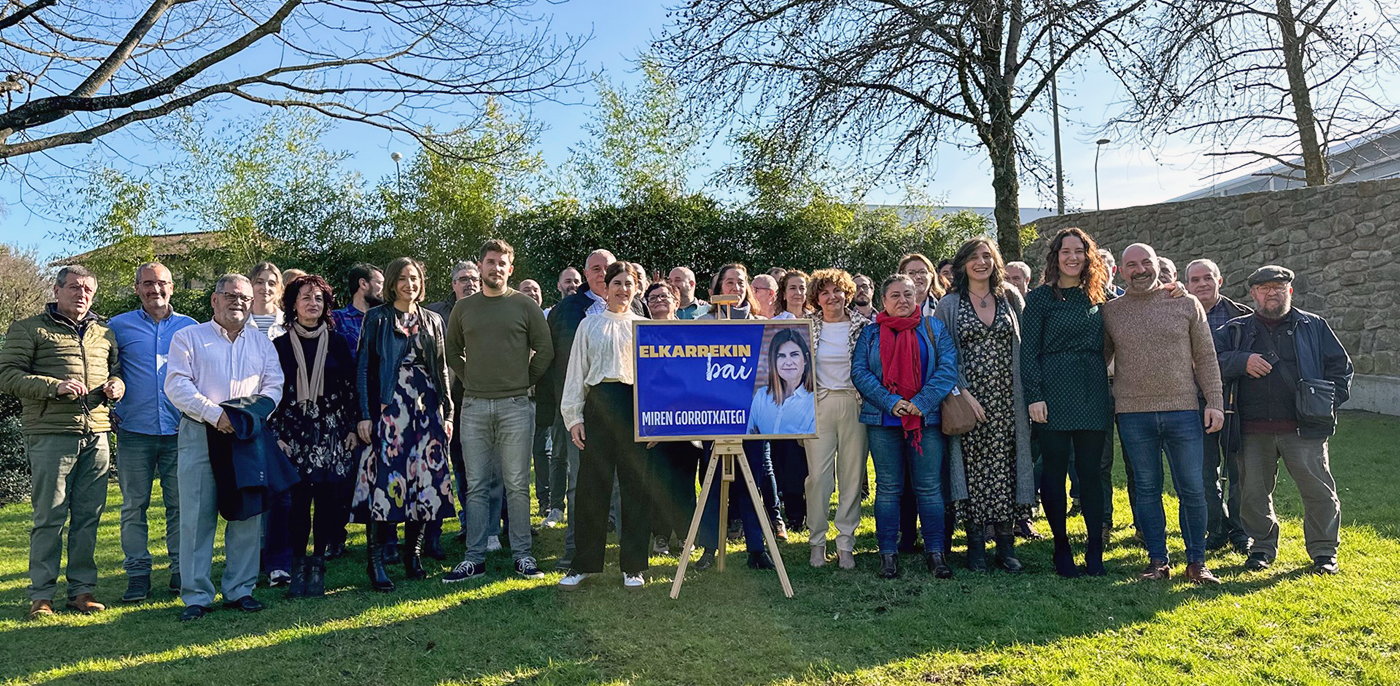
Public presentation of Miren Gorrotxategi's candidacy for the primary elections of Podemos Euskadi ("Elkarrekin Bai" candidacy), for the 2024 Basque regional election. Durango, 2024.

Gorrotxategi again ran as lead candidate for Elkarrekin Podemos (Podemos Euskadi and Green Aliance) in the 2024 Basque regional election. Her party suffered a wipeout, losing all six of its seats. She apologised and considered it the wrong move to divide the vote on the left, where newcomers Sumar received only one seat. She then left politics and returned to academia.

== Personal life ==
As of 2020, Gorrotxategi lived in Durango and was married and had two children. She is the sister of the tenor Andeka Gorrotxategi. She declares herself a feminist, environmentalist and Basque speaker. She is passionate about the political philosophy of the French Revolution.

== See also ==
- Pablo Iglesias Turrión
- Alba García Martín
