= Artano =

Artano can refer to:

- Sauron, character in Lord of the Rings
- Artano (surname)
