= Aitzole Araneta =

Spanish sexologist and transfeminist activist (born 1982)

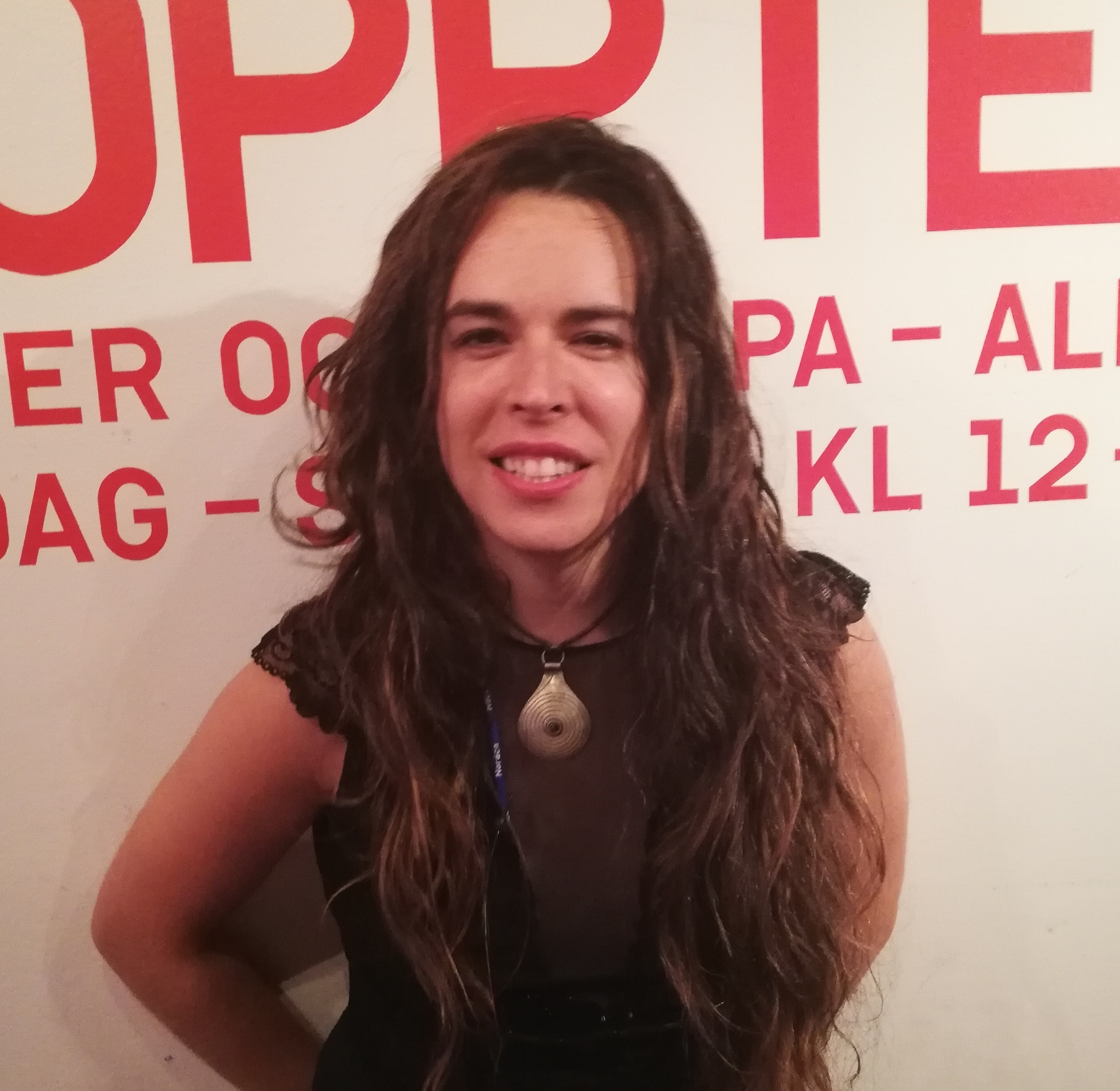
- Born: Aitzole Araneta Zinkunegi; November 22, 1982 (age 42); San Sebastián, Spain
- Occupation(s): Sexologist and LGBTI activist

Aitzole Araneta Zinkunegi (born November 22, 1982) is a Spanish sexologist and transfeminist activist.

== Biography ==
She expressed her gender identity when she was four years old.

She specialized in Sexology at the University of Alcalá de Henares and completed interdisciplinary gender studies at the Autonomous University of Madrid.

She is a member of the Podemos political party, serving as a state counselor for Health and LGBTI affairs.

In 2019, she led the Elkarrekin Podemos ticket for mayor of San Sebastián. She served on the municipal council from 2019 to 2022, where she acted as spokesperson for the Elkarrekin Podemos/Izquierda Unida/Equo group.

In 2022, she was accused by her coalition colleague, Haizea Garay, of verbal and physical abuse. Araneta denied the accusations on social media and announced legal action.

Elkarrekin Podemos announced that Aitzole Araneta would not lead their candidacy for the mayoralty of San Sebastián in 2023.
