= Rebelion.org =

Nonprofit news website

Rebelión is a nonprofit news site, started in Spain at the end of 1996 by a group of journalists. It contains scientific and opinion articles covering topics such as current affairs, free knowledge, culture, ecology, economics, and resistance to globalization. Texts by, and translations into Spanish from, authors such as Heinz Dieterich, Noam Chomsky, Marta Harnecker, Eduardo Galeano, José Saramago, Gabriel García Márquez, Julio Anguita, Vicenç Navarro and Ralph Nader have been included in Rebelión.

== Organization ==
Rebelión emerged in 1996, developed from Spain by a nonprofit group of journalists who boosted another model of communication not dependent on large media or market conditionings. The site does not have physical location and works through organization by sections with a responsible assigned by section. The ideological orientation of published contents is based on:

(...) to accommodate all the voices that honestly and sincerely try to bring some clarity and truth on behalf of the people and silenced by the mainstream media. (...) For those who are only the voice of power, money and neoliberalism, there is no place in Rebelion, they already have CNN.

According to their promoters, it is an alternative means which publishes news that are not considered important by traditional media. Furthermore, it tries to give a different news treatment to "showing the interests that economic and political powers among the capitalist world hide in order to preserve their privileges and current status". It rests on Non governmental organizations and people who work to "change the world from a radically different, more just, equal and balanced perspective".

The web site content is hosted on the servers of the Institute of Political Studies for Latin America and Africa (IEPALA), Gloobal.net.

Rebelión has a team of Spanish-language translators. Those who translate texts into other languages number, according to the website, about thirty people.

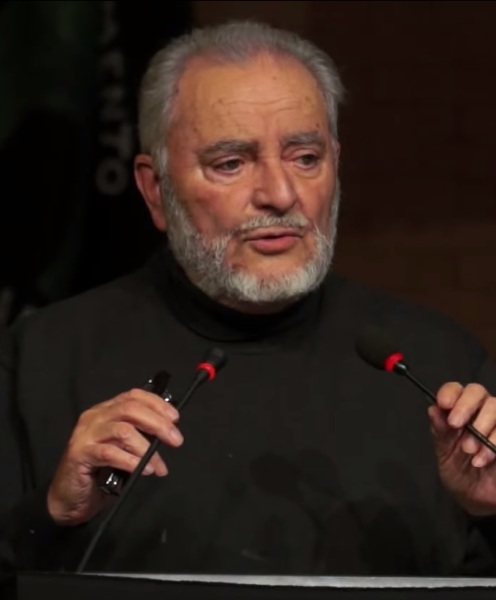
Julio Anguita

== Contents ==
The website mostly contains opinion articles, as well as news, interviews and reviews about current politic, social, economic and cultural themes all over the world. There is an especial emphasis in Latin America and Near East. The highlight is the capitalism critics, the international American politics and the Zionism. Rebelión contains some sections: Free Knowledge, Culture, Social Ecology, Economy, Lies and Media, Opinion and Another World is Possible. It also has geographical sections focusing on Africa, Argentina, Bolivia, Brazil, Chile, Colombia, Cuba, Ecuador, the USA, Spain, Europe, Iraq, Mexico, Palestine, the Near East, and Venezuela. Rebelión contains digital books and texts for free download in its section Free Books. The texts with an original Rebelión source has a license Creative Commons Acknowledgment nonprofit without derivative works. However, sometimes the text traduction license of famous writers it does not provide or it is a source unknown.

== Relevance ==
The website has a Pagerank site in 7, according to Google. Alexa placed it at about rank 22,000 in September 2009.

Rebelión has around 150,000 page reads per day. Alexa places Rebelión as the most read alternative Spanish information website in the world, with users from more than 50 countries.

== Publications ==
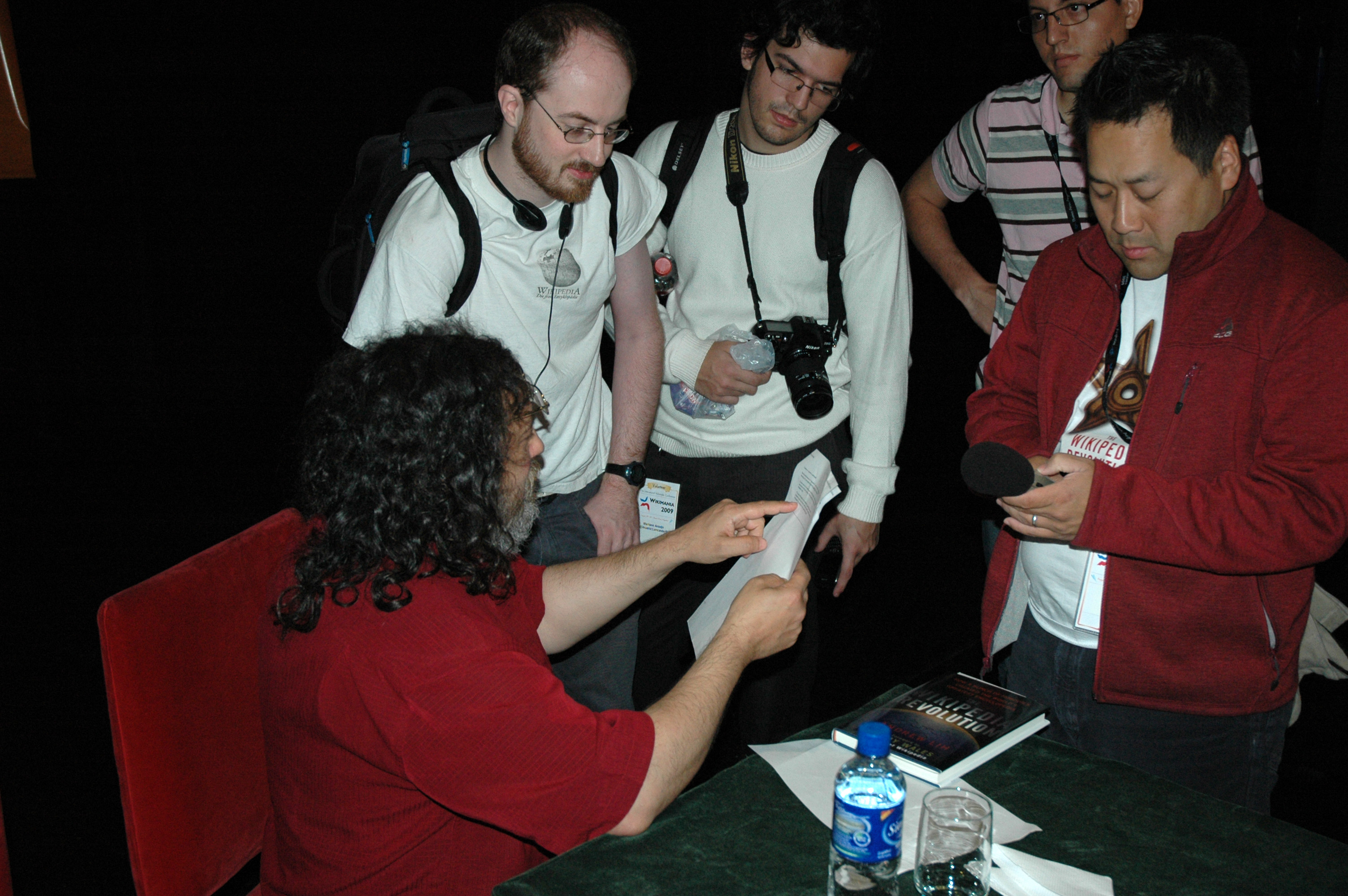
Richard Stallman talking about rebelion.org with Wikipedians (Wikimania 2009)

Rebelión has published two collective books, with the help of their regular columnists, who ceded their texts for the edition in paper. El caso Venezuela 11-04-02 [Translation: The Venezuelan Case 11-04-02]. The following journalists participated in this edition: Ignacio Ramonet (director of Le Monde Diplomatique), Stella Calloni (La Jornada), Enrique Ortega (Resumen Latinoamericano), Antonio Maira (Cádiz Rebelde), Eva Bjorklund (Revista Kuba de Suecia), and the intellectuals Santiago Alba Rico y Carlos Fernández Liria.

The second work was entitled Washington contra el mundo [Translation: Washington against the World]. This book, dealing with recent events, was a selection of 24 articles written by 18 authors from 7 different countries, who regularly collaborate with Rebelión. Noam Chomsky, James Petras, Eduardo Galeano, Vázquez Montalbán, Carlos Taibo, Julio Anguita, Edward Said, Michel Collon, Gary Lupp, Michel Chossudovsky, John Brown, Santiago Alba Rico, Michael Parenti, Simón Royo, Pascual Serrano, Roni Ben Efrat and Javier Barreda participated in this selection. The book has a prologue by the journalist and writer Javier Ortiz and was published by Editorial Akal.

Another book is La batalla de los intelectuales: nuevo discurso de las armas y las letras ("The battle of intellectuals: new discourse about weapons and letters") by the playwright Alfonso Sastre. In its second edition, it included several texts about the debate developed in Rebelión after its first edition.

== Controversy ==
According to Rebelión, the direction of the Spanish newspaper El País wrote an email to the journalist Pascual Serrano demanding the withdrawal of an article entitled "El País contra Chávez, fuego a discreción" for violation of their copyright. Pascual Serrano's attorney replied that "does not reproduce the article, but it makes a quotation of it protected by the article 32 of Law 23/2006 of 7 July, by amending the Revised Intellectual Property Act, approved by the Royal Legislative Decree 1/1996 of 12 April. According to Rebelión, El Pais maintained its position regarding to the violation of copyright, and Pascual Serrano his, keeping the published article.

In June 2008, the URL of the site was included in the blacklist of spam of Spanish Wikipedia, which produced an intense internal debate in the encyclopedia. The decision was reported by some media and debated in Wikimania 2009 after Richard Stallman said he did not agree with the domain inclusion in that blacklist.

== Bibliography ==
- Alegre, Luis (ed.) (2002). Periodismo y crimen. El caso Venezuela 11-04-02. Hondarribia, Guipúzcoa: Argitaletxe HIRU. OCLC 51607583.
- Sastre, Alfonso (2003). La batalla de los intelectuales: nuevo discurso de las armas y las letras. La Habana: Editorial de Ciencias Sociales. OCLC 57469980.
- Varios autores (2003). Washington contra el mundo. Madrid: Foca Ediciones. OCLC 52213854.
