= Artano (surname) =

Artano is a surname. Notable people with the surname include:

- Pilar Zabala Artano, Spanish politician
- Stéphane Artano, French politician
