= Lolo Rico =

Spanish writer, television producer, screenwriter, and journalist (1935–2019)

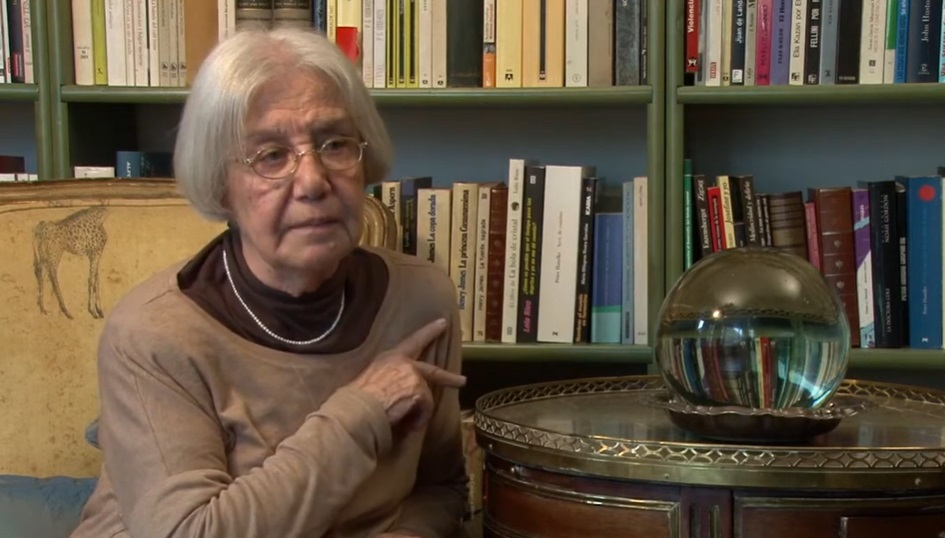
- Born: María Dolores Rico Oliver; 1935; Madrid, Spain
- Died: 20 January 2019 (aged 83–84); San Sebastián (Guipúzcoa), Spain
- Occupations: Journalist, writer and television producer
- Years active: 1970s-1988

María Dolores Rico Oliver (1935, Madrid – 20 January 2019, San Sebastián, Guipúzcoa), known professionally as Lolo Rico, was a writer, television producer, screenwriter and Spanish journalist.

== Career ==
She began her career writing children's stories and working on Radio Nacional de España and Televisión Española. For Radio Nacional she directed and wrote in the 70s the children's show Dola, Dola, tira la bola, for which she created the character of Dola and for which she received an Ondas prize in 1977.

For TVE she wrote the children programs La casa del reloj and Un globo, dos globos, tres globos in the 1970s. As a creator and director she started in 1981, with the TV show La cometa blanca. In 1984, for Saturday's mornings, she created the famous TV show La bola de cristal, an innovative program in tune with the ideas of the then current movida madrileña.

== Personal life ==
She had seven children with her husband Santiago Alba, but they divorced as it was not a happy marriage. Among her children are the philosopher Santiago Alba Rico and writer and photographer Isabel Alba Rico. She is grandmother of the Podemos politician Nagua Alba.

She died on 20 January 2019 due to cardiorespiratory arrest at 83.
