= 2016 Basque regional election =

Election in the Spanish region of the Basque Country

- 25 September 2016

All 75 seats in the Basque Parliament 38 seats needed for a majority
- Opinion polls
- Registered: 1,783,419 ▲0.5%
- Turnout: 1,070,357 (60.0%) ▼3.9 pp
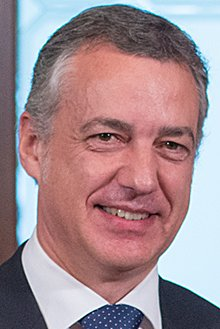

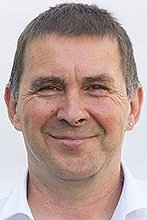

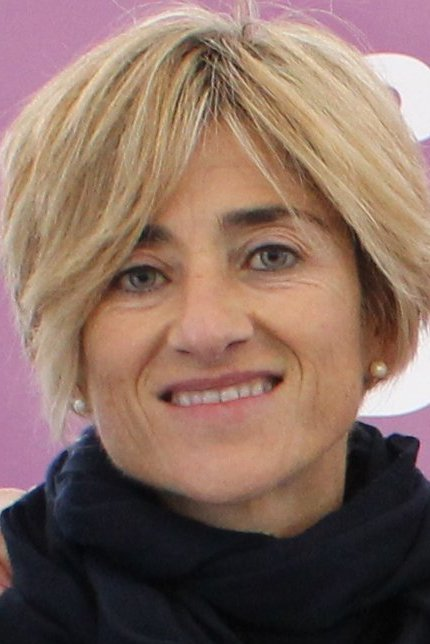

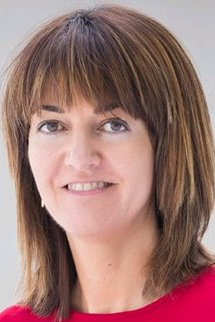

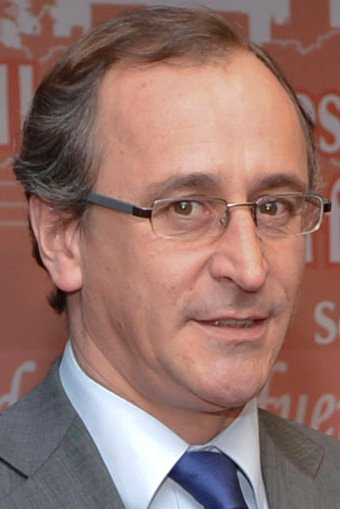
	First party	Second party	Third party
Leader	Iñigo Urkullu	Arnaldo Otegi (Note: Sortu leader Arnaldo Otegi was proclaimed as EH Bildu's leading candidate on 24 May 2016, having left the Logroño prison on 1 March after serving a full prison sentence over attempts to reorganize the banned Batasuna party. On 24 August, the Gipuzkoa Provincial Electoral Commission disqualified Otegi due to a legal barring from holding any public office still in force until 2021. Subsequently, EH Bildu did not elect an alternative candidate to replace Otegi, though journalist Maddalen Iriarte—second in EH Bildu Gipuzkoa's list—went on to top the list as provided for in Article 65.2 of the Electoral Law of the Basque Country.)	Pilar Zabala
Party	EAJ/PNV	EH Bildu	Elkarrekin Podemos
Leader since	2 December 2007	24 May 2016	11 August 2016
Leader's seat	Álava	~~Gipuzkoa~~	Gipuzkoa
Last election	27 seats, 34.2%	21 seats, 24.7%	0 seats, 3.7% (Note: Results for IU–LV (2.7%, 0 seats) and Equo (1.0%, 0 seats) in the 2012 election.)
Seats won	28	18	11
Seat change	▲1	▼3	▲11
Popular vote	398,168	225,172	157,334
Percentage	37.4%	21.1%	14.8%
Swing	▲3.2 pp	▼3.6 pp	▲11.1 pp
	Fourth party	Fifth party
Leader	Idoia Mendia	Alfonso Alonso
Party	PSE–EE (PSOE)	PP
Leader since	20 September 2014	15 October 2015
Leader's seat	Biscay	Álava
Last election	16 seats, 18.9%	10 seats, 11.6%
Seats won	9	9
Seat change	▼7	▼1
Popular vote	126,420	107,771
Percentage	11.9%	10.1%
Swing	▼7.0 pp	▼1.5 pp
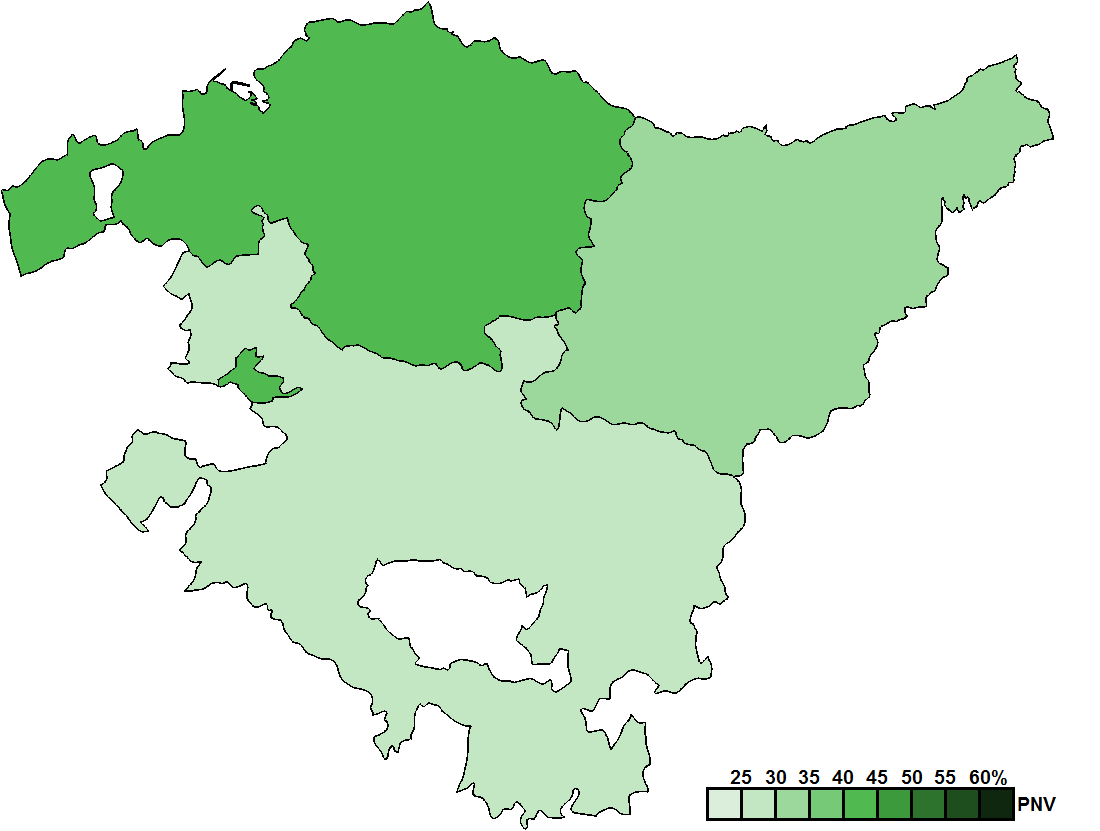
Lehendakari before election
Iñigo Urkullu
EAJ/PNV
Lehendakari after election
Iñigo Urkullu
EAJ/PNV

A regional election was held in the Basque Country on 25 September 2016 to elect the 11th Parliament of the autonomous community. All 75 seats in the Parliament were up for election. It was held concurrently with a regional election in Galicia. Lehendakari Iñigo Urkullu announced that the election would be held one month ahead of schedule, on 25 September 2016, based on the "climate of ungovernability" affecting national politics as a result of the ongoing Spanish government formation negotiations, intending to move the regional election as far away as possible from a possible new general election. This prompted Galician president Alberto Núñez Feijóo to hold the Galician regional election in the same date.

Urkullu's Basque Nationalist Party (PNV) emerged as the largest political force in the region with an increased plurality, but required from the support of other parties to govern. This was to be provided by the Socialist Party of the Basque Country–Basque Country Left (PSE–EE), which despite scoring the worst result in its history after seeing its support almost halved—falling from 18.9% and 16 seats to 11.9% and 9 seats—would go on to form a coalition minority government with the PNV. EH Bildu was able to hold onto second place, albeit with a reduced support by going down from 21 to 17 seats, whereas the Elkarrekin Podemos alliance scored third, but below campaign expectations. The People's Party (PP) continued on its long-term decline in the Basque Country, whereas Citizens (Cs) failed to win any seat.

Urkullu was able to get re-elected as lehendakari with the support of both his party and the PSE–EE. The resulting coalition recovered an alliance which both the PNV and the PSE had already formed between 1987 and 1998 in the Basque government, and which had already been extended to city councils and the Juntas Generales following the 2015 local and foral elections.

The results of the Basque and Galician elections, both of which saw very poor PSOE's performances after being overtaken by the Podemos-led alliances and polling at record-low levels of support, prompted dissenters within the party—led by Andalusian president Susana Díaz—to call for Pedro Sánchez's resignation as PSOE secretary-general. Sánchez's refusal to resign and his announcement of a party congress for later in the year—amid an ongoing government formation process and with the growing risk of a third general election in a row being held in Spain—led to an attempt from his critics to force his downfall, triggering a severe party crisis and a breakdown of party discipline which led to Sánchez's ousting on 1 October 2016, a divided PSOE abstaining in Mariano Rajoy's investiture on 29 October and a subsequent party leadership election in 2017 which would see Sánchez returning to his post of secretary-general and taking full control over the party.

== Background ==
The 2012 Basque regional election had resulted in a minority government of the Basque Nationalist Party (PNV) replacing Patxi López's Socialist Party of the Basque Country–Basque Country Left (PSE–EE) cabinet. After a harsh 2009–2012 legislature which had seen frequent clashing between both parties, the signing of an agreement in September 2013 between both the PNV and the PSE, under which the latter committed itself to support the 2014 budget in exchange for more social democrat fiscal policies, paved the way for the normalization of relations between the two parties. The agreement eventually led to the culmination of an ideological realignment within the PNV, whose economic stance had been swinging in the previous years towards social democracy in detriment of its traditional pro-liberal positions. Additionally, the PNV under Urkullu had abandoned the confrontational style of former lehendakari Juan José Ibarretxe as well as his sovereigntist plan, moving towards more moderate, pragmatic and big tent positions.

Following the 2015 local and foral elections, the PNV and the PSE signed a deal "for institutional stability", under which both parties agreed to support each other in Basque local councils and the Juntas Generales, with the compromise of extending such an agreement to the Basque government after the regional election scheduled for 2016. Concurrently, the emergence of Podemos following the 2014 European Parliament election was initially seen as a threat to the PNV's dominance in the region, after opinion polls pointed to a strong performance of the party in a prospective Basque Parliament election as well as coming out in first place regionally in the 2015 and 2016 general elections. The various elections held in the Basque Country between 2012 and 2016 showed a continued decline for both the PSE–EE and the People's Party (PP), whereas EH Bildu suffered from a perceived poor management in the city council of San Sebastián and the Gipuzkoa foral deputation and lost much of its power in the local and foral elections held on 24 May 2015.

In the lead up to the election, the national PSOE was beleaguered by an internal crisis over Pedro Sánchez's leadership as a result of the party having secured its worst electoral results since the Spanish transition to democracy in the 2015 and 2016 general elections, with Sánchez himself having announced an early party congress, to be held at some point following the Basque and Galician elections, in which he would be running for re-election. The PSOE branches in both regions were widely seen as being supportive of Sánchez, prompting dissenters to frame the elections as a test on Sánchez and of the broader political mood in Spain after nine months of political impasse over the government formation process.

== Overview ==
Under the 1979 Statute of Autonomy, the Basque Parliament was the unicameral legislature of the Basque Autonomous Community, having legislative power in devolved matters, as well as the ability to grant or withdraw confidence from a lehendakari. The electoral and procedural rules were supplemented by national law provisions.

=== Date ===
The term of the Basque Parliament expired four years after the date of its previous election, unless it was dissolved earlier. The election decree was required to be issued no later than 25 days before the scheduled expiration date of parliament and published on the following day in the Official Gazette of the Basque Country (BOPV), with election day taking place 54 days after the decree's publication. The previous election was held on 21 October 2012, which meant that the chamber's term would have expired on 21 October 2016. The election decree was required to be published in the BOPV no later than 27 September 2016, setting the latest possible date for election day on 20 November 2016.

The lehendakari had the prerogative to dissolve the Basque Parliament at any given time and call a snap election, provided that no motion of no confidence was in process. In the event of an investiture process failing to elect a lehendakari within a 60-day period from the Parliament's reconvening, the chamber was to be automatically dissolved and a fresh election called.

The Basque Parliament was officially dissolved on 2 August 2016 with the publication of the corresponding decree in the BOPV, setting election day for 25 September.

=== Electoral system ===
Voting for the Parliament was based on universal suffrage, comprising all Spanish nationals over 18 years of age, registered in the Basque Country and with full political rights, provided that they had not been deprived of the right to vote by a final sentence, nor were legally incapacitated. Additionally, non-resident citizens were required to apply for voting, a system known as "begged" voting (Spanish: Voto rogado).

The Basque Parliament had 75 seats. All were elected in three multi-member constituencies—corresponding to the provinces of Álava, Biscay and Gipuzkoa, each of which was assigned a fixed number of 25 seats to provide for an equal parliamentary representation of the three provinces—using the D'Hondt method and closed-list proportional voting, with a three percent-threshold of valid votes (including blank ballots) in each constituency. The use of this electoral method resulted in a higher effective threshold depending on district magnitude and vote distribution.

The law did not provide for by-elections to fill vacant seats; instead, any vacancies arising after the proclamation of candidates and during the legislative term were filled by the next candidates on the party lists or, when required, by designated substitutes.

=== Outgoing parliament ===
The table below shows the composition of the parliamentary groups in the chamber at the time of dissolution.

Parliamentary composition in August 2016
Groups	Parties	Legislators	
Groups	Parties	Seats	Total
Basque Nationalists Parliamentary Group	EAJ/PNV	27	27
EH Bildu Parliamentary Group	Sortu	10	21
EH Bildu Parliamentary Group	EA	6	21
EH Bildu Parliamentary Group	Aralar	3	21
EH Bildu Parliamentary Group	Alternatiba	2	21
Basque Socialists Parliamentary Group	PSE–EE (PSOE)	16	16
Basque People's Parliamentary Group	PP	10	10
Mixed Group	UPyD	1	1

== Parties and candidates ==
The electoral law allowed for parties and federations registered in the interior ministry, alliances and groupings of electors to present lists of candidates. Parties and federations intending to form an alliance were required to inform the relevant electoral commission within 10 days of the election call, whereas groupings of electors needed to secure the signature of at least one percent of the electorate in the constituencies for which they sought election, disallowing electors from signing for more than one list. Additionally, a balanced composition of men and women was required in the electoral lists, so that candidates of either sex made up at least 40 percent of the total composition.

Below is a list of the main parties and alliances which contested the election:

Candidacy	Parties and alliances	Leading candidate	Ideology	Previous result		Gov.	Ref.
Candidacy	Parties and alliances	Leading candidate	Ideology	Vote %	Seats	Gov.	Ref.
EAJ/PNV	List: Basque Nationalist Party (EAJ/PNV)	Iñigo Urkullu	Basque nationalism Christian democracy Social democracy	34.2%	27	Yes	
EH Bildu	List: Create (Sortu); Basque Solidarity (EA); Aralar (Aralar); Alternative (Alternatiba)	Arnaldo Otegi	Basque independence Abertzale left Socialism	24.7%	21	No	
PSE–EE (PSOE)	List: Socialist Party of the Basque Country–Basque Country Left (PSE–EE (PSOE))	Idoia Mendia	Social democracy	18.9%	16	No	
PP	List: People's Party (PP)	Alfonso Alonso	Conservatism; Christian democracy	11.6%	10	No	
Elkarrekin; Podemos	List: We Can (Podemos); Plural Left–United Left (EzAn–IU) – Communist Party of the Basque Country (PCE/EPK) – The Dawn Marxist Organization (La Aurora (OM)) – Republican Left (IR) – Open Left (IzAb) – Feminist Party of Spain (PFE); Equo (Equo)	Pilar Zabala	Left-wing populism Direct democracy Democratic socialism	3.7%	0	No	
C's	List: Citizens–Party of the Citizenry (C's)	Nicolás de Miguel	Liberalism	Did not contest		No	

The Union, Progress and Democracy (UPyD) party, despite holding one seat in the Basque Parliament for two legislatures—2009 and 2012—and amid dismal opinion poll ratings, renounced to field candidates for the regional election.

On 1 March 2016, Sortu leader Arnaldo Otegi left the Logroño prison after serving his full prison sentence imposed for attempting to reorganize the banned Batasuna party. In addition to the prison sentence, Otegi had been disqualified from holding any public office until 2021. Despite this, on 24 May the EH Bildu coalition proclaimed him as its leading candidate for lehendakari, on grounds that the ruling did not specify what specific criminal charges affected his disqualification. The PNV and Podemos announced that they would not challenge his candidacy because they thought it should be up to the Basque citizens to decide whether Otegi deserved to be elected or not; the PSE–EE, meanwhile, said that it would not challenge him either because such a decision should be taken by justice courts. On the other hand, the PP, Citizens (C's) and UPyD announced that, following the publication of the electoral lists, they would challenge Otegi's candidacy.

On 24 August the provincial electoral commission of Gipuzkoa ruled that Otegi could not be a candidate in the lists of EH Bildu for being barred to stand for election as part of his sentence. The journalist Maddalen Iriarte, who was second in EH Bildu Gipuzkoa's list, went on to top the list as provided for in Article 65.2 of the Electoral Law of the Basque Country.

== Campaign ==
=== Party slogans ===
Party or alliance	Original slogan	English translation	Ref.
EAJ/PNV	« Eraiki Euskadi. Mira el futuro »	"Build the Basque Country. Look to the future"	
EH Bildu	« Aquí y ahora. Un país compartido » « Hemen eta orain. Denon herria »	"Here and now. A shared country"	
PSE–EE (PSOE)	« Juntos » « Batera »	"Together"	
PP	« Alonso, la voz que nos une » « Alonso, batzen gaituen ahotsa »	"Alonso, the voice that unites us"	
Elkarrekin Podemos	« Por Euskadi. Jendearekin »	"For the Basque Country. With the people"	
C's	« Europeos del Sur, españoles del Norte, vascos de centro »	"Europeans from the South, Spaniards from the North, Basques of centre"	

== Opinion polls ==
The tables below list opinion polling results in reverse chronological order, showing the most recent first and using the dates when the survey fieldwork was done, as opposed to the date of publication. Where the fieldwork dates are unknown, the date of publication is given instead. The highest percentage figure in each polling survey is displayed with its background shaded in the leading party's colour. If a tie ensues, this is applied to the figures with the highest percentages. The "Lead" column on the right shows the percentage-point difference between the parties with the highest percentages in a poll.

=== Voting intention estimates ===
The table below lists weighted voting intention estimates. Refusals are generally excluded from the party vote percentages, while question wording and the treatment of "don't know" responses and those not intending to vote may vary between polling organisations. When available, seat projections determined by the polling organisations are displayed below (or in place of) the percentages in a smaller font; 38 seats were required for an absolute majority in the Basque Parliament.

Color key:

Poll conducted after legal ban on opinion polls

Polling firm/Commissioner	Fieldwork date	Sample size	Turnout	PNV	EH Bildu	PSE–EE (PSOE)	PP	EzAn–IU	UPyD	Podemos	C's	Elkarrekin Podemos	Lead
2016 regional election	25 Sep 2016	—N/a	60.0	37.4; 28	21.1; 18	11.9; 9	10.1; 9	(Note: Within Elkarrekin Podemos.)	–		2.0; 0	14.8; 11	16.3
Gizaker/EITB	23–25 Sep 2016	2,400	?	36.5; 27/30	20.7; 16/18	11.1; 8/10	9.7; 7/8		–		2.2; 0/1	17.9; 13/15	15.8
Celeste-Tel/eldiario.es	12–16 Sep 2016	1,200	64.1	37.3; 29	20.4; 15	11.9; 9	8.4; 7		–		2.0; 0	18.3; 15	16.9
Gizaker/EITB	14–15 Sep 2016	1,200	64.4	37.2; 27/29	21.0; 17	11.0; 8/9	9.7; 7/8		–		2.3; 0/1	17.8; 13/14	16.2
GAD3/ABC	14–15 Sep 2016	801	?	38.5; 28/29	19.7; 15/16	10.8; 8/9	9.2; 8/9		–		1.4; 0	17.8; 14/15	18.8
Metroscopia/El País	13–15 Sep 2016	2,100	65.8	36.3; 27/29	19.2; 16/17	12.1; 8	8.8; 6/7		–		2.0; 1	17.9; 14/16	17.1
Sigma Dos/El Mundo	12–15 Sep 2016	1,200	?	35.1; 26/28	21.1; 17/18	12.5; 9	9.5; 7/9		–		2.1; 0	16.9; 13/14	14.0
NC Report/La Razón	6–14 Sep 2016	1,000	?	36.2; 27	21.0; 16	11.4; 9	9.1; 8		–		? 0	18.8; 15	15.2
Ikerfel/El Correo	8–11 Sep 2016	2,700	65.4	36.7; 28	18.9; 14/15	12.9; 9/10	8.8; 8		–		2.2; 0	19.3; 15/16	17.4
Ikertalde/GPS (Note: "PAÍS VASCO (Autonómicas), Septiembre 2016. Sondeo Ikertalde / Gob. Vasco". Electograph (in Spanish). 14 September 2016.)	1–8 Sep 2016	2,576	64.5	33.5; 26	21.3; 17	11.7; 9	9.2; 8		–		2.2; 0	19.3; 15	12.2
Gizaker/EITB	5–6 Sep 2016	1,200	63.5	36.2; 27	20.7; 17	10.7; 8	10.3; 8		–		2.7; 1	18.2; 14	15.5
IMOP/CIS	27 Aug–2 Sep 2016	3,007	?	37.9; 27/28	20.2; 16	10.8; 8	8.8; 8		–		1.8; 0	18.9; 15/16	17.7
2016 general election	26 Jun 2016	—N/a	64.9	24.9 (18)	13.3 (10)	14.2 (11)	12.9 (10)	(Note: Within Unidos Podemos.)	0.1 (0)		3.5 (1)	29.1 (25)	4.2
Gizaker/EITB	8–9 Jun 2016	1,200	?	37.2; 27	21.3; 17	10.7; 8	9.1; 8		0.4; 0		2.7; 1	18.2; 14	15.9
Ikertalde/GPS	23 May–2 Jun 2016	2,310	67.5	31.8; 24	21.0; 17	12.3; 9	8.7; 7		0.2; 0		2.2; 1	20.8; 17	10.8
Ikertalde/GPS	23 May–2 Jun 2016	2,310	67.5	31.8; 24	21.0; 18	12.3; 10	8.7; 8	3.0; 0	0.2; 0	17.8; 14	2.2; 1	–	10.8
SYM Consulting	5–20 May 2016	1,274	?	34.1; 25/26	20.4; 15/17	11.8; 8/9	9.1; 7/8		–		3.5; 1	20.7; 16/17	13.4
Gizaker/EITB	11–12 May 2016	1,200	?	35.5; 27	20.2; 16	11.0; 9	9.2; 7		0.2; 0		3.0; 1	19.4; 15	15.3
Gizaker/EITB	13–14 Apr 2016	1,200	?	35.3; 27	19.0; 15	12.1; 10	8.8; 7	2.4; 0	0.2; 0	19.1; 15	2.3; 1	–	16.2
Ikertalde/GPS	25 Jan–2 Feb 2016	2,310	70.5	31.3; 24	19.1; 15	12.0; 9	8.8; 8	2.5; 0	0.2; 0	20.5; 18	3.3; 1	–	10.8
CPS/EHU	19–31 Jan 2016	600	67	29.3; 22/23	16.3; 13	12.2; 9	9.4; 8/9	–	–	25.2; 19/21	3.6; 1/3	–	4.1
Redondo & Asociados	16 Jan 2016	?	?	30.0; 22/23	19.0; 13/14	12.8; 10	8.3; 6	3.0; 0/1	–	25.0; 21/22	–	–	5.0
2015 general election	20 Dec 2015	—N/a	69.0	24.7 (18)	15.1 (12)	13.2 (10)	11.6 (10)	2.9 (1)	0.3 (0)	26.0 (21)	4.1 (3)	–	1.3
CPS/EHU	29 May–15 Jun 2015	600	65	33.5; 25/26	23.1; 18/19	14.5; 10/11	8.1; 7/8	–	1.7; 0	15.1; 11/12	–	–	10.4
2015 foral elections	24 May 2015	—N/a	63.8	33.3 (26)	22.4 (18)	13.6 (10)	9.3 (9)	2.7 (1)	0.5 (0)	13.7 (11)	2.1 (0)	–	10.9
CPS/EHU	27 Oct–14 Nov 2014	600	67	30.5; 22/23	19.7; 13/14	12.8; 10	8.1; 6	3.2; 0/1	2.2; 0/1	25.6; 21/22	–	–	4.9
2014 EP election	25 May 2014	—N/a	43.1	27.5 (21)	23.4 (21)	13.8 (12)	10.2 (10)	5.6 (4)	3.3 (1)	6.9 (6)	0.8 (0)	–	4.1
CPS/EHU	30 Apr–19 May 2014	600	60	34.2; 29	23.9; 22	16.5; 12	8.1; 7	6.4; 3	2.2; 1	4.8; 1	–	–	10.3
CPS/EHU	24 Oct–15 Nov 2013	1,200	60	34.9; 29	25.9; 23	15.5; 12	9.6; 8	4.4; 2	2.2; 1	–	–	–	9.0
Ikertalde/GPS	8–11 Oct 2013	2,289	64.0	34.7; 27	24.1; 21	17.7; 15	10.8; 10	3.1; 1	2.3; 1	–	–	–	10.6
CPS/EHU	7–27 May 2013	1,200	60	34.0; 28	24.0; 20	18.0; 14	10.0; 10	4.0; 2	3.0; 1	–	–	–	10.0
Ikertalde/GPS	22–27 Apr 2013	2,277	63.5	34.9; 27	24.2; 21	17.8; 15	10.0; 10	3.1; 1	2.5; 1	–	–	–	10.7
2012 regional election	21 Oct 2012	—N/a	64.0	34.2; 27	24.7; 21	18.9; 16	11.6; 10	2.7; 0	1.9; 1	–	–	–	9.5

=== Voting preferences ===
The table below lists raw, unweighted voting preferences.

Polling firm/Commissioner	Fieldwork date	Sample size	PNV	EH Bildu	PSE–EE (PSOE)	PP	EzAn–IU	UPyD	Podemos	C's	Elkarrekin Podemos	Question	X mark	Lead
2016 regional election (Note: Does not include non-resident citizens.)	25 Sep 2016	—N/a	23.2	13.1	7.4	6.3		–		1.2	9.1	—N/a	37.7	10.1
GAD3/ABC	14–15 Sep 2016	801	36.0	9.5	7.8	5.7		–		0.5	10.9	–	–	25.1
Ikertalde/GPS	1–8 Sep 2016	2,576	20.8	14.0	4.9	1.9		–		1.2	11.9	23.0	18.9	6.8
IMOP/CIS	27 Aug–2 Sep 2016	3,007	29.8	12.7	6.2	2.4		–		0.7	13.1	24.1	7.0	16.7
2016 general election	26 Jun 2016	—N/a	16.7	8.9	9.5	8.6		0.1		2.4	19.5	—N/a	32.6	2.8
Ikertalde/GPS	23 May–2 Jun 2016	2,310	20.3	15.1	5.7	2.1		0.4		0.9	12.0	25.0	15.8	5.2
Ikertalde/GPS	23 May–2 Jun 2016	2,310	20.3	15.1	5.7	2.1	2.5	0.4	9.5	0.9	–	25.0	15.8	5.2
Ikertalde/GPS	25 Jan–2 Feb 2016	2,310	20.9	12.3	5.2	2.3	1.7	0.3	13.6	1.6	–	23.1	16.8	7.3
CPS/EHU	19–31 Jan 2016	600	22.3	13.5	7.7	2.3	–	–	18.7	0.7	–	32.4		3.6
2015 general election	20 Dec 2015	—N/a	17.6	10.7	9.4	8.2	2.1	0.2	18.4	2.9	–	—N/a	28.6	0.8
CPS/EHU	29 May–15 Jun 2015	600	24.7	17.0	7.5	1.2	–	–	9.3	–	–	37.4		7.7
2015 foral elections	24 May 2015	—N/a	20.9	14.1	8.6	5.9	1.7	0.3	8.6	1.3	–	—N/a	36.2	6.8
CPS/EHU	27 Oct–14 Nov 2014	600	19.8	12.5	4.3	1.0	1.3	0.8	19.3	–	–	–	–	0.5
2014 EP election	25 May 2014	—N/a	12.1	10.3	6.1	4.5	2.4	1.5	3.1	0.4	–	—N/a	55.5	1.8
CPS/EHU	30 Apr–19 May 2014	600	20.3	14.7	8.8	0.5	4.5	0.8	3.2	–	–	–	–	5.6
CPS/EHU	24 Oct–15 Nov 2013	1,200	22.0	16.5	6.4	1.6	2.4	0.8	–	–	–	–	–	5.5
CPS/EHU	7–27 May 2013	1,200	21.5	15.9	7.0	1.6	3.6	0.9	–	–	–	–	–	5.2
2012 regional election	21 Oct 2012	—N/a	22.3	16.1	12.3	7.6	1.8	1.3	–	–	–	—N/a	34.2	6.2

=== Victory preferences ===
The table below lists opinion polling on the victory preferences for each party in the event of a regional election taking place.

Polling firm/Commissioner	Fieldwork date	Sample size	PNV	EH Bildu	PSE–EE (PSOE)	PP	C's	Elkarrekin Podemos	Other/ None	Question	Lead
IMOP/CIS	27 Aug–2 Sep 2016	3,007	36.8	13.4	6.0	2.0	0.6	15.0	6.3	19.8	21.8

=== Victory likelihood ===
The table below lists opinion polling on the perceived likelihood of victory for each party in the event of a regional election taking place.

Polling firm/Commissioner	Fieldwork date	Sample size	PNV	EH Bildu	PSE–EE (PSOE)	PP	C's	Elkarrekin Podemos	Other/ None	Question	Lead
GAD3/ABC	14–15 Sep 2016	801	82.6	2.3	1.8	2.8	–	5.3	0.7	4.5	77.3
IMOP/CIS	27 Aug–2 Sep 2016	3,007	74.6	1.6	0.9	1.3	0.1	7.9	0.5	13.2	66.7

=== Preferred Lehendakari ===
The table below lists opinion polling on leader preferences to become lehendakari.

Polling firm/Commissioner	Fieldwork date	Sample size									Other/ None/ Not care	Question	Lead
Polling firm/Commissioner	Fieldwork date	Sample size	Urkullu PNV	Otegi EH Bildu	Iriarte EH Bildu	Larrión EH Bildu	Mendia PSE–EE	Alonso PP	De Miguel C's	Zabala EP	Other/ None/ Not care	Question	Lead
Gizaker/EITB	14–15 Sep 2016	1,200	38.5	4.2	10.4	–	1.4	0.8	0.3	5.4	–	39.0	28.1
GAD3/ABC	14–15 Sep 2016	801	42.5	–	–	6.4	7.0	4.7	–	8.0	18.6	12.8	34.5
Gizaker/EITB	5–6 Sep 2016	1,200	38.0	16.9	–	–	1.6	1.0	0.1	6.1	0.1	36.2	21.1
IMOP/CIS	27 Aug–2 Sep 2016	3,007	37.6	–	13.5	–	5.1	2.2	0.1	8.6	7.2	25.8	24.1
Gizaker/EITB	11–12 May 2016	1,200	35.5	17.2	–	–	2.5	–	–	2.1	0.9	41.8	18.3

== Results ==
=== Overall ===
← Summary of the 25 September 2016 Basque Parliament election results →
Parties and alliances	Popular vote			Seats	
Parties and alliances	Votes	%	±pp	Total	+/−
Basque Nationalist Party (EAJ/PNV)	398,168	37.36	+3.20	28	+1
Basque Country Gather (EH Bildu)	225,172	21.13	−3.54	18	−3
United We Can (Podemos, Ezker Anitza–IU, Equo)^{1}	157,334	14.76	+11.04	11	+11
Socialist Party of the Basque Country–Basque Country Left (PSE–EE (PSOE))	126,420	11.86	−7.03	9	−7
People's Party (PP)	107,771	10.11	−1.48	9	−1
Citizens–Party of the Citizenry (C's)	21,477	2.02	New	0	±0
Animalist Party Against Mistreatment of Animals (PACMA/ATTKAA)	8,589	0.81	+0.45	0	±0
Let's Win the Basque Country: Yes We Can (Ganemos Irabazi)	6,049	0.57	New	0	±0
Zero Cuts–Green Group (Recortes Cero–GV)	2,747	0.26	New	0	±0
Family and Life Party (PFyV)	1,836	0.17	+0.10	0	±0
Blank Seats (EB/AZ)	1,288	0.12	−0.90	0	±0
Vox (Vox)	771	0.07	New	0	±0
Basque Communists–Communist Party of the Peoples of Spain (EK–PCPE)	466	0.04	±0.00	0	±0
Welcome (Ongi Etorri)	374	0.04	+0.03	0	±0
Humanist Party (PH)	351	0.03	−0.07	0	±0
Navarrese Freedom (Ln)	191	0.02	New	0	±0
Union, Progress and Democracy (UPyD)	n/a	n/a	−1.91	0	−1
Blank ballots	6,681	0.63	−0.67		
Total	1,065,685			75	±0
Valid votes	1,065,685	99.56	+0.37		
Invalid votes	4,672	0.44	−0.37		
Votes cast / turnout	1,070,357	60.02	−3.94		
Abstentions	713,062	39.98	+3.94		
Registered voters	1,783,419				
Sources
Footnotes: ^{1} United We Can results are compared to the combined totals of United Left–The Greens: Plural Left and Equo Greens–Basque Ecologists in the 2012 election.

Popular vote
EAJ/PNV	37.36%
EH Bildu	21.13%
E. Podemos	14.76%
PSE–EE (PSOE)	11.86%
PP	10.11%
C's	2.02%
Others	2.13%
Blank ballots	0.63%

Seats
EAJ/PNV	37.33%
EH Bildu	24.00%
E. Podemos	14.67%
PSE–EE (PSOE)	12.00%
PP	12.00%

=== Distribution by constituency ===
Constituency	PNV		EH Bildu		EP		PSE–EE		PP	
Constituency	%	S	%	S	%	S	%	S	%	S
Álava	28.0	8	17.8	5	16.1	4	12.9	3	18.5	5
Biscay	41.8	11	17.5	5	14.8	4	11.7	3	9.7	2
Gipuzkoa	34.1	9	28.7	8	14.2	3	11.8	3	7.2	2
Total	37.6	28	21.3	18	14.9	11	11.9	9	10.2	9

== Aftermath ==
=== Government formation ===
Investiture
Ballot →	23 November 2016		24 November 2016	
Required majority →	38 out of 75		Simple	
Iñigo Urkullu (PNV): • PNV (28); • PSE–EE (9)	37 / 75	X mark	37 / 75	check
Maddalen Iriarte (EH Bildu): • EH Bildu (18)	18 / 75	X mark	18 / 75	X mark
Abstentions/Blank ballots: • EP (11); • PP (9)	20 / 75		20 / 75	
Absentees	0 / 75		0 / 75	

== Bibliography ==
- Ley Orgánica 3/1979, de 18 de diciembre, de Estatuto de Autonomía para el País Vasco (Organic Law 3/1979). Official State Gazette (in Spanish). 18 December 1979 [version as of 22 December 1979]. BOE-A-1979-30177.
- Ley 7/1981, de 30 de junio, sobre Ley de Gobierno (Law 7/1981). Official State Gazette (in Spanish). 30 June 1981 [version as of 8 June 2016]. BOE-A-2012-5927.
- Ley Orgánica 5/1985, de 19 de junio, del Régimen Electoral General (Organic Law 5/1985). Official State Gazette (in Spanish). 19 June 1985 [version as of 31 March 2015]. BOE-A-1985-11672.
- Ley 5/1990, de 15 de junio, de Elecciones al Parlamento Vasco (Law 5/1990). Official State Gazette (in Spanish). 15 June 1990 [version as of 7 January 2016]. BOE-A-2012-2859.
- Decreto 23/2016, de 1 de agosto, del Lehendakari, por el que se disuelve el Parlamento Vasco y se convocan elecciones (PDF) (Decree 23/2016). Official Gazette of the Basque Country (in Spanish). 1 August 2016.
