= Alba García Martín =

Spanish psychologist, activist, and politician (born 1988)

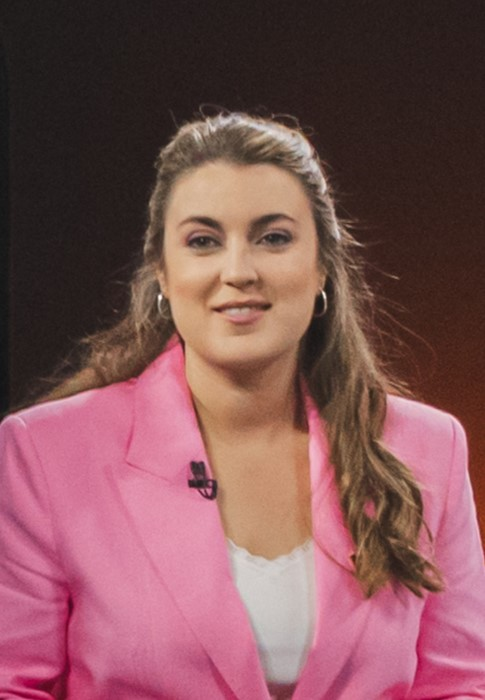
- Alba García Martín in 2024

General Coordinator of Sumar Mugimendua
- Incumbent
- Assumed office 30 November 2024
- Preceded by: Office established

Personal details
- Born: Alba María García Martín; 22 October 1988 (age 37) Bilbao (Basque Country); Spain
- Party: Sumar Mugimendua (since 2024)
- Other political affiliations: Podemos Euskadi (2021–2024)
- Education: University of Deusto
- Occupation: Psychologist • Anti-racism activist • Politician

Alba María García Martín (born in Bilbao on 22 October 1988) is a Spanish psychologist, anti-racism activist, and politician. She is the current general coordinator of the Sumar Mugimendua political party.

She was the coordinator of SOS Racism in Biscay. She is part of the Big Road association for community development in Senegal. She was an institutional action technician for Podemos Euskadi (2021–2024), and in 2023 began her political career with the Podemos Euskadi party.

In 2024, she was proposed by the party Sumar Mugimendua to lead the Sumar Euskadi coalition in the Basque Country, as a Lehendakari (head of government) candidate in the 2024 Basque regional election. She did not obtain a seat as a deputy in the Basque Parliament.

On 30 November 2024, García was elected as general coordinator (general secretary) of the Sumar Mugimendua political party.

== Biography ==
Born in Bilbao (Biscay). She got a licenciate degree in psychology in the University of Deusto (2006–2011). In the last year of her degree, she was selected by the Bizkaia Talent agency for the Talentia program (2010–2011), since then being part of the Talentia Network. Later, she completed a master's degree in psychology of social intervention at the University of Deusto.

She specializes in social intervention. She worked for three years at the Lagun Artean shelter with different groups. Then she worked for around ten years at the Telefónica Association of Retired Persons as a psychologist. She was the coordinator of SOS Racismo in Biscay, as an expert in anti-racism. and social intervention.

In 2020, she founded the Big Road Elkartea association, an association for community development in Senegal-Euskadi. She also participates in feminist activism. She is a member of the feminist organization feministAlde! She also collaborates as an opinion columnist with various media, including among others El Correo, Deia, elDiario.es, El Salto, and Naiz.

In 2021, she began working for the political party Podemos Euskadi in the Institutional Action secretary as an institutional action technician and as a coordinator of institutional action, electoral campaigns, and electoral program, being part of the team of technicians of the party. As a worker for the Podemos Euskadi party, she ran as a workers' delegate of the Basque Workers' Solidarity (ELA) union in the union elections.

== Political career ==
=== Podemos Euskadi (2023) ===
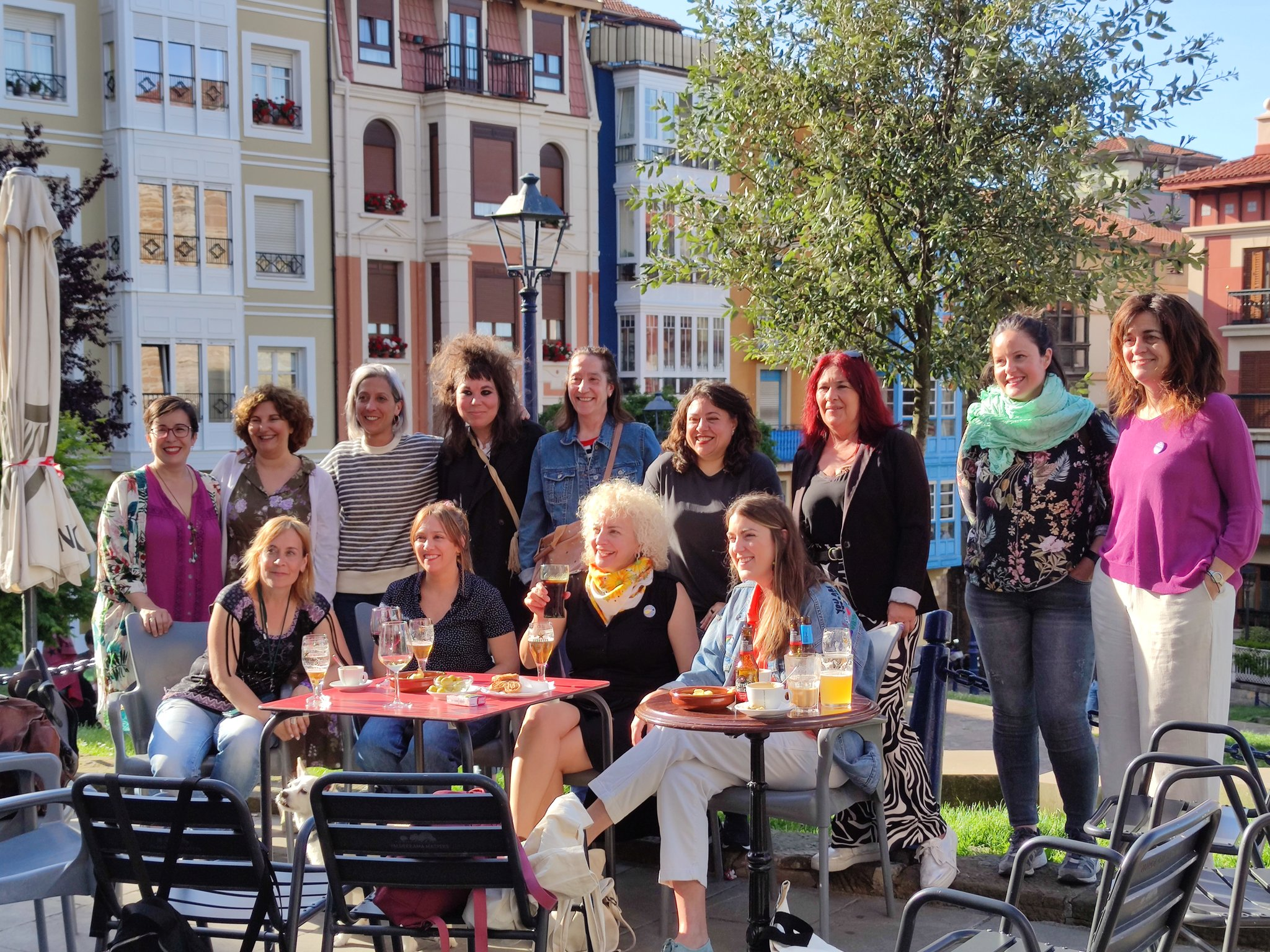
Women Meeting of Podemos Euskadi (Santurtzi, 2023).

In 2023, she took the step into politics, as a candidate, with the Podemos Euskadi political party. In the 2023 Spanish local elections, she was a candidate for council member of the Bilbao City Council, for the Elkarrekin Bilbao electoral alliance (Podemos Euskadi, Ezker Anitza, Equo Berdeak and Green Alliance), with Ana Viñals as a candidate for mayor of Bilbao.

In the 2023 Basque foral elections, she was a candidate for deputy of the General Assembly of Biscay (regional parliament of Biscay), for the Bilbao constituency, for the Elkarrekin Bizkaia electoral alliance (Podemos Euskadi, Ezker Anitza, Equo Berdeak and Green Aliance), with Eneritz de Madariaga as candidate for General Deputy of Biscay (head of government). Although she did not obtain a seat as a deputy of the regional Parliament.

=== Sumar Mugimendua (2024) ===
In 2024, García was proposed by the Sumar Mugimendua political party to head the Sumar Euskadi electoral alliance in Euskadi (alliance created by the three Basque political parties Sumar Mugimendua, Ezker Anitza, and Equo Berdeak), as a Lendakari (president of the government) candidate in the 2024 Basque regional election. For that, she stopped being a member of the Podemos Euskadi party and she began as a member of the party Sumar Mugimendua to lead the Sumar Euskadi electoral alliance. However she did not obtain a seat as a deputy in the Basque Parliament.

On 30 November 2024, García was elected as general coordinator (general secretary) of the Sumar Mugimendua political party, at the party's founding assembly held on that date in Bilbao. The general coordination of the party was constituted as collegiate with three "co-leaders", who are García, Lander Martínez and Edurne García, but in which García herself would have a "prominent role" as leader.

== Personal life ==
She resides in Bilbao. She declares herself a feminist and anti-racist.
