= Heinz Dieterich =

German-Mexican sociologist and political analyst (1943–2026)

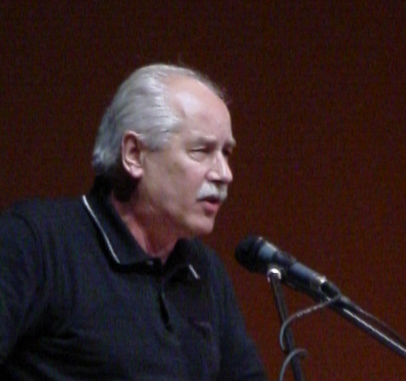
Dieterich lectures about 21st Century Socialism at the WFDY, Caracas, 2005

Heinz Dieterich Steffan (1943 – 18 July 2026) was a German sociologist and a political analyst who resided in Mexico. He was best known for his left wing ideals. He contributed to several journals and published more than 30 books about conflict in Latin America, global society and the ideological controversies that characterised the 20th century, among other philosophical and social scientific topics.

== Background ==
Dieterich was born in 1943 in Rotenburg an der Wümme. After completing his university studies in sociology in Frankfurt and Bremen, he moved to Latin America. Since 1977 he has been a professor in sociology and methodology at the Universidad Autónoma Metropolitana in Mexico, D.F. Since then he has shown a lot of interest in politics and social movements in Latin America, and documented a great deal of their activity.

He is considered one of the most important figures in the "New School of Bremen" in sociology, constituted by Arno Peters, Carsten Stahmer, and the Cuban physicist Raimundo Franco. This school implements principles of cybernetics, quantum mechanics and the "principle of equivalence" to sociology. In 1996, Steffan contributed to the creation of the alternative information website Rebelion.org, where he contributed regularly.

Dieterich died on 18 July 2026.

== Ideological contributions ==
Steffan's contributions represent one of the most relevant references to analyse the theoretical and practical implications of the Marxist anticapitalist leftist movements that followed the fall of the USSR. His contributions suggest an alternative economic, political and social project, which the alter-globalistic movements lacked during the 1990s.

In his book The Socialism of the 21st century (German: Der Sozialismus des 21. Jahrhunderts), Steffan explains the theoretical basis of the new socialism, which finds its most practical application in the revolutionary process of Venezuela, and to a lesser extent in Bolivia and Ecuador. Dieterich was an advisor of the Venezuelan government.

Some of his most important books are "Global Society" and "Latin America: From Colonization to Globalization", which he wrote in cooperation with Noam Chomsky.

His ideas have raised several controversies, especially in Venezuela. The Marxist theoretician Alan Woods has written a whole book against his allegedly reformist positions, Reformism or Revolution - A Reply to Heinz Dieterich. However, his relationship with Venezuelan President Hugo Chávez deteriorated after he defended General Baduel, who led the "no" campaign in the 2007 constitutional referendum. On 15 August 2011, he submitted an article to the website kaosenlared.net where he explained the reasons over his break with Chávez.
