= Vicenç Navarro =

Spanish sociologist and political scientist (born 1937)

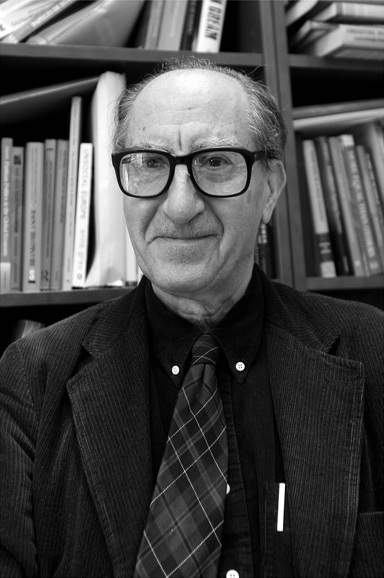
- Vicente Navarro photographed in 2008
- Born: 1937 (age 88–89); Gironella, Spain
- Known for: Political scientist and sociologist

Academic background
- Education: Johns Hopkins University (PhD)

Vicente Navarro (born 1937 in Gironella, Spain) is a Spanish sociologist and political scientist. He has been a Professor of Health and Public Policy at Johns Hopkins University, US, for over 30 years. He is also emeritus professor in political and social science at the Pompeu Fabra University in Barcelona, Spain, and is the director of the JHU-UPF Public Policy Center in Barcelona, which is jointly sponsored by the two institutions. He is also the director of the Observatorio Social de España, where he coordinates a research project on the welfare state.

== Education ==
He was educated at different universities including the University of Barcelona, the London School of Economics, University of Oxford, University of Edinburgh, where he received his DMSA and Johns Hopkins University, where he received his DrPH (Doctor of Public Health), and has received honorary doctoral degrees in Economics from the University of Lleida and the University of Málaga, both in Spain.

== Career ==
Besides his academic career, he has been an advisor to several governments. He has worked within global institutions such as the United Nations and the World Health Organization, and has been an advisor to the President of the European Parliament. In 1984 he served as health policy advisor to the presidential campaign of Jesse Jackson.

Navarro has published 24 books which have been translated into several languages, the most recent being The Social Underdevelopment of Spain: Causes and Consequences (El Subdesarrollo Social de España: Causas y Consecuencias), Anagrama; There Are Alternatives: Proposals to Create Employment and Social Wellbeing in Spain (Hay Alternativas. Propuestas para Crear Empleo y Bienestar Social en España), Ed. Seguitur (With Juan Torres and Alberto Garzón); Neoliberalism, Globalization and Inequalities, Baywood; and Attack on Democracy and Wellbeing: A Critique of the Dominant Economic Thinking (Ataque a la democracia y al bienestar. Crítica al pensamiento económico dominante), Anagrama, 2015. He is also a regular contributor to the Spanish newspaper Público, as well as Rebelion.org.

He received the essay prize of the publishing company Anagrama for his book Insufficient Wellbeing, Incomplete Democracy. On That Which is not Spoken About in our Country (Bienestar insuficiente, democracia incompleta. De lo que no se habla en nuestro país), which is the Spanish equivalent to the Pulitzer Prize. In 2014, Professor Navarro was awarded the Stebbins Medal from Johns Hopkins University. According to the Agency of International Scientific Information of the University of Pennsylvania (Lauder Institute of Management and International Studies), professor Navarro is one of the most quoted Hispanic scientists in the international scientific literature in the social sciences.

== Works ==
- Dangerous to your health. Capitalism in health care, Monthly Review Press (1993)
- The politics of Health Policy. The US reforms, 1980-1994, Blackwell (1994)
- Neoliberalismo y Estado del Bienestar. Madrid, Ariel Económica, 3a edició ampliada (2000)
- Globalización Económica, Poder Político y Estado del Bienestar. Madrid, Ariel Económica (2000)
- Bienestar Insuficiente, Democracia Incompleta. De lo que no se habla en nuestro país. XXX Premi Anagrama d'Assaig, Barcelona, Anagrama (2002)
- The Political Economy of Social Inequalities. Consequences for Health and Quality of Life (2002)
- El estado de Bienestar en España (2003)
- L'estat del Benestar a Catalunya (2003)
- Political and Economic Determinants of Population Health and Well-Being, Baywood (with C. Muntaner) (2004)
- The Political and Social Context of Health, Baywood (2004)
- El subdesarrollo social de España: causas y consecuencias, Barcelona, Anagrama (2006)
- Hay alternativas - Vicenç Navarro, Juan Torres López i Alberto Garzón.
- Lo que España necesita. Una réplica con propuestas alternativas a la política de recortes del PP. Vicenç Navarro, Juan Torres y Alberto Garzón. Editorial Deusto (2012)
- Los amos del mundo. Las armas del terrorismo financiero. Vicenç Navarro y Juan Torres López. Editorial Espasa (2012)
- Lo que debes saber para que no te roben la pensión. Vicenç Navarro y Juan Torres López. Editorial Espasa (2013)
- The financial and economic crises and their impact on health and social well-being. Baywood Publishing Company (2014)
- Ataque a la democracia y al bienestar. Crítica al pensamiento económico dominante. Anagrama (2015)
