= Santiago Alba Rico =

Spanish writer

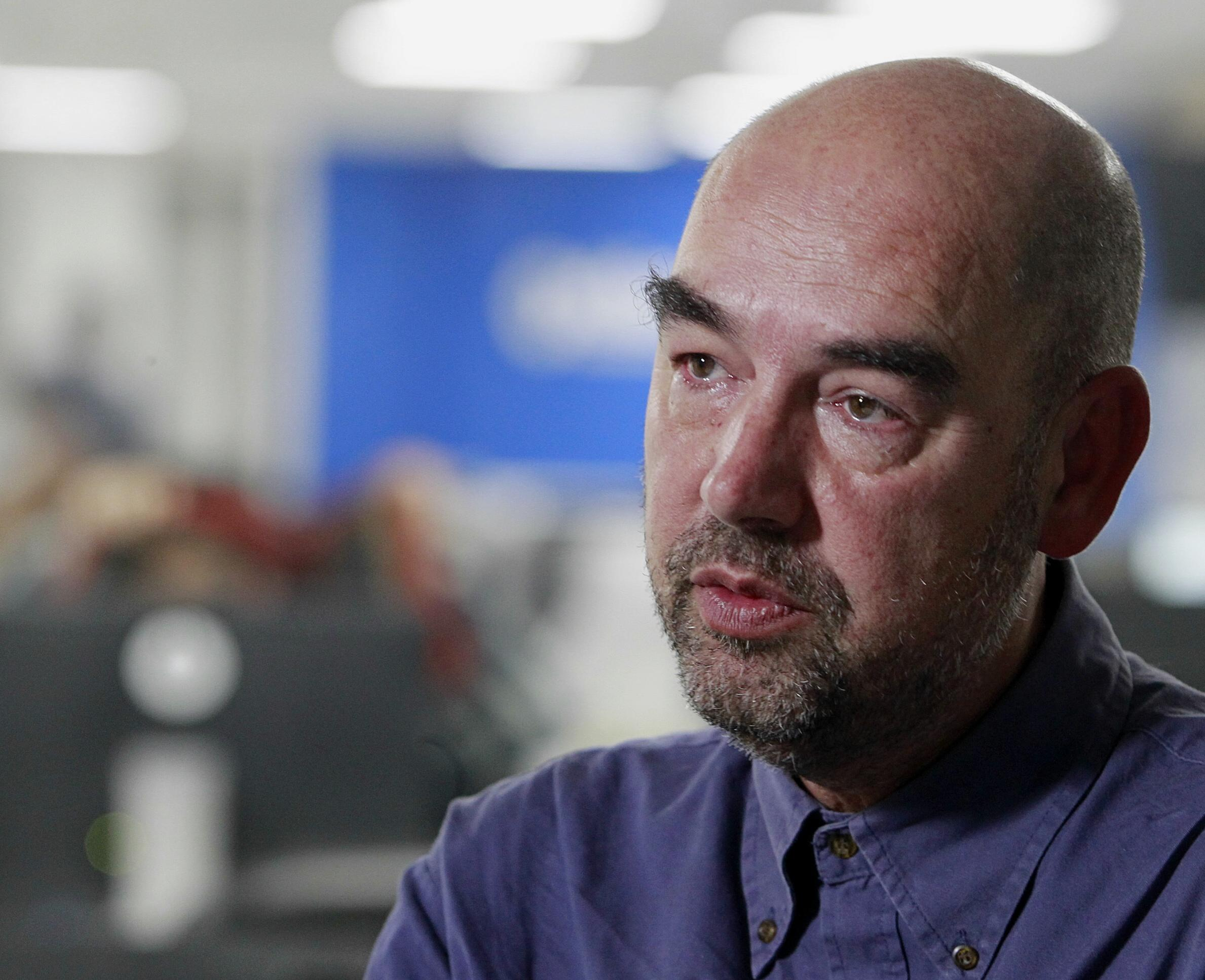
- During an interview with eldiario.es
- Born: 1960 (age 64–65); Madrid, Spain
- Occupations: Philosopher; essayist; screenwriter; translator
- Mother: Lolo Rico
- Relatives: Santiago Alba (great-grandfather); Nagua Alba (niece)

Santiago Alba Rico (born 1960) is a Spanish writer and philosopher. He has lived in Tunisia for much of the 21st century. He is known for essays such as Las reglas del caos, Leer con niños or Capitalismo y nihilismo.

== Biography ==
Santiago Alba Rico was born in Madrid in 1960, the son of journalist, producer, and screenwriter Lolo Rico, who was also the mother of writer Isabel Alba Rico. He is also the great-grandson of politician Santiago Alba Bonifaz and the uncle of Nagua Alba.

Alba earned a licentiate degree in philosophy from the Complutense University of Madrid. He joined the crew of TVE's children show La bola de cristal (created by his mother) as a screenwriter (1984–1988), introducing content under a Marxist point of view. He relocated to Cairo in 1991 and then to Tunisia in 1998. He has worked as a translator to Spanish from Arabic. He was opposed to the rule of Muammar Gaddafi and Bashar al-Assad in the context of the Libyan and Syrian conflicts.

Podemos presented Alba as their candidate for the Senate in the constituency of the province of Ávila (he owns a residence in Piedralaves) vis-à-vis the December 2015 general election, failing to win the seat.

== Works ==
Author

- — (1992). ¡Viva el mal! ¡Viva el capital!.
- — (1995). Las reglas del caos. Apuntes para una antropología del mercado.
- — (1999). El mundo incompleto. Un cuento sobre la creación y los autores.
- — (2001). ¡Viva la CIA! ¡Viva la Economía!.
- — (2001). La ciudad intangible. Ensayo sobre el fin del neolítico.
- — (2003). Torres más altas.
- — (2003). Galería de gente victoriosa: relatos y artículos sobre Irak.
- — (2006). Vendrá la realidad y nos encontrará dormidos. Partes de guerra y prosas de resistencia.
- — (2007). Leer con niños.
- — (2015). Islamofobia: nosotros, los otros, el miedo. Barcelona: Icaria.
- — (2021). España. Madrid: Lengua de Trapo.

Co-author

- —; Fernández Liria, Carlos (1986). Dejar de pensar.
- —; Fernández Liria, Carlos (1989). Volver a pensar.
