= Rosa Maria Martinez =

Rosa Maria Martinez can refer to:

- Mirtha Legrand (born Rosa María Juana Martínez Suárez in 1927), Argentine actress
- Lina Romay (born Rosa María Almirall Martínez, 1954–2012), Spanish Catalan actress
- Rosa María Martínez Denegri, Mexican politician, president of the Authentic Party of the Mexican Revolution in the 1990s
- Rosa María Martínez, producer of Mexican 2000 TV series Ramona (2000 TV series)
