= Nagua Alba =

Spanish politician (born 1990)

Member of the Congress of Deputies
- In office 2016–2019
- Constituency: Gipuzkoa

Personal details
- Born: Nayua Miriam Goveli Alba; 16 March 1990 (age 36) Madrid, Spain
- Party: Podemos
- Education: University of the Basque Country; Autonomous University of Madrid

Nayua Miriam Goveli Alba (born 1990), best known as Nagua Alba, is a Spanish politician. She was a member of the 11th and 12th terms of the Congress of Deputies in representation of Gipuzkoa.

== Biography ==
Born on 16 March 1990 in Madrid, daughter of writer Isabel Alba Rico, her father is an Egyptian, Ahmed Goueli. Through her mother, she is granddaughter of Lolo Rico and great-great-granddaughter of Santiago Alba Bonifaz. Raised in the Basque Autonomous Community, she earned a licentiate degree in Psychology from the University of the Basque Country, later obtaining a Master in Psychology of the Education at the Autonomous University of Madrid (UAM).

She led the Podemos-Ahal Dugu congressional electoral list in Gipuzkoa for the December 2015 general election, and became a member of the 11th term of the Lower House. She became the Secretary-General of Podemos Euskadi in March 2016, replacing Roberto Uriarte. She repeated the leading place in the party list in Gipuzkoa for the June 2016 general election, renovating her seat for the 12th Congress of Deputies.

Considered (in the context of the Vistalegre II party assembly) close to the project of Íñigo Errejón (defeated by Pablo Iglesias'), she called in August 2017 a snap primary election to determine the party leadership in the Basque Country, announcing she would not stand up for re-election.

Party political offices
Preceded by Roberto Uriarte	Secretary-General of Podemos Euskadi; 2016–2017	Succeeded by Lander Martínez
