= Pilar Zabala Artano =

Pilar Zabala
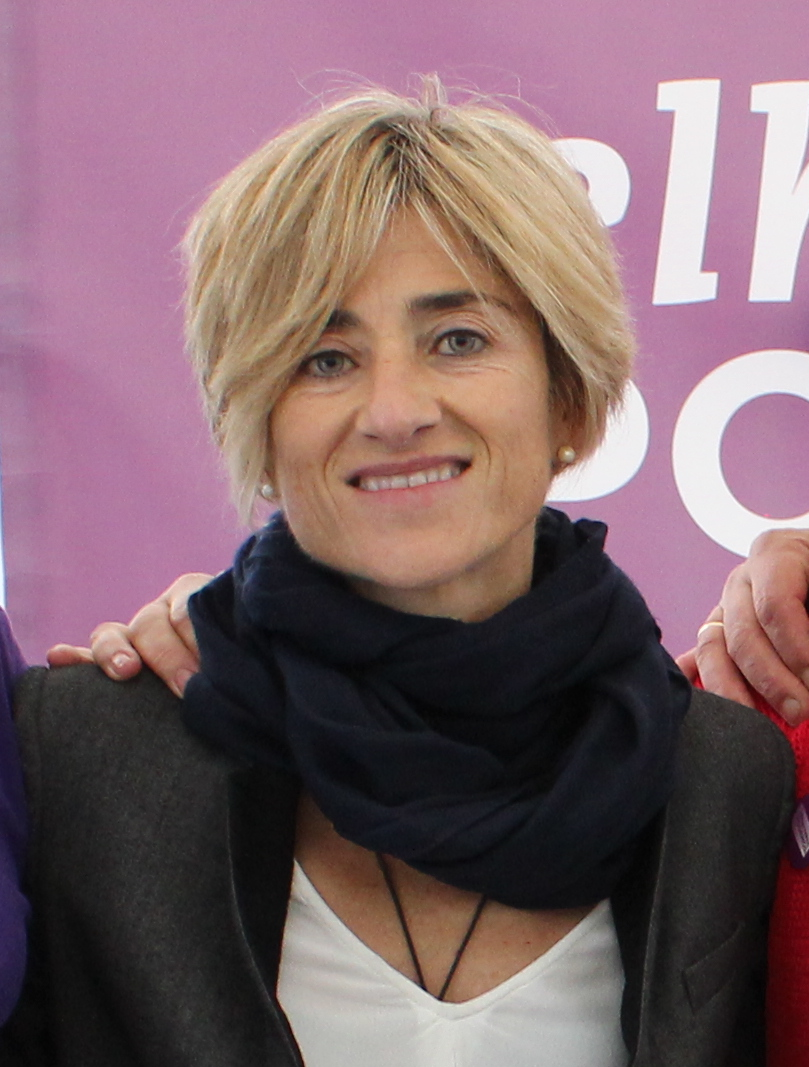
- Pilar Zabala in 2016.

Member of the Basque Parliament
- In office 21 October 2016 – 12 July 2020
- Constituency: Gipuzkoa

Personal details
- Born: María Pilar Zabala Artano; 1968 (age 57–58) Tolosa, Gipuzkoa
- Party: Elkarrekin Podemos
- Education: University of the Basque Country
- Occupation: Odontologist, professor, politician

María Pilar Zabala Artano (born 1968 in Tolosa), commonly known as Pili Zabala is an odontologist, professor and Spanish politician, as well as Elkarrekin Podemos candidate for Lehendakari in the 2016 Basque parliamentary election.

== Biography ==
Born in Tolosa in 1968, she resides in Zarautz. She is married and mother to a son and a daughter. The disappearance of her brother Joxi Zabala in 1983 marked her life; Joxi, an alleged member of ETA, was kidnapped, tortured and murdered by the GAL. Since then, she became an activist for peace and reconciliation in the Basque Country.

=== Candidate for lehendakari ===
On 20 July 2016 she was presented as the candidate for lehendakari of the party board of Podemos' Basque regional branch. She contested the party's primary elections the following week against five other candidates and won with 52% of the vote, becoming the party's official candidate for the 2016 Basque parliamentary election. On 12 August 2016, after a coalition agreement between Podemos, Ezker Anitza, and Equo, she became the candidate for lehendakari of Elkarrekin Podemos, name of the broader coalition.
