= Ezker Anitza =

Ezker Anitza La Izquierda Plural
- Spokesperson: Íñigo Martínez
- General Coordinator: Isabel Salud
- Founded: 28 January 2012
- Merger of: Communist Party of the Basque Country; Alternative Plural Space; Independents
- Ideology: Socialism; Anti-capitalism; Communism; Eurocommunism; Self-determination; Feminism
- Political position: Left-wing to far-left
- National affiliation: United Left
- Regional affiliation: Sumar Euskadi (2024–present); Elkarrekin Podemos (2016–2024)
- Congreso de los Diputados (Basque seats): 1 / 18 Inside Sumar
- Basque Parliament: 1 / 75 Inside Sumar
- Batzar Nagusiak: 1 / 153
- Local representatives: 36 / 2,628 Inside Irabazi, Udalberri - Bilbao en Común, Guk Getxo and Errenteria Irabaziz

Website
- www.ezker-anitza.org

Ezker Anitza (EzAn–IU, Spanish: La Izquierda Plural, lit. 'Plural Left') is the Basque federation of United Left. The party was established in January 2012 after United Left–Greens (EB–B) was disenfranchised as IU's referent in the Basque Country. Isabel Salud is the current General Coordinator.

The Communist Party of Euskadi (EPK-PCE, Basque federation of PCE) is the major member of the coalition.

== Electoral performance ==
=== Basque Parliament ===
Basque Parliament
Election	Votes	%	#	Seats	+/–	Leading candidate	Status in legislature
2012	30,318	2.69%	5th	0 / 75	0	Mikel Arana	No seats
2016	Within EP			2 / 75	2	Pilar Zabala	Opposition
2020	Within EP–IU			3 / 75	1	Miren Gorrotxategi	Opposition
2024	Within Sumar			1 / 75	2	Alba García	Opposition
