= Elkarrekin Podemos =

Spanish electoral alliance

United We Can Elkarrekin Podemos
- Leader: Miren Gorrotxategi
- Founded: 11 August 2016
- Dissolved: 27 February 2024
- Ideology: Democratic socialism Progressivism; Environmentalism
- Political position: Left-wing
- Colors: Purple
- Members: See list of members

Website
- lafuerzadelopublico.eus

Elkarrekin Podemos (Elkarrekin in Basque: "Together" or "United"; Podemos in Spanish: "We Can"; Elkarrekin Podemos translated in English as "United We Can") was a left-wing electoral alliance in the Basque Country created by the four Basque political parties Podemos Euskadi, Ezker Anitza, Equo Berdeak and Green Alliance. The electoral alliance ran in the 2016 and 2020 Basque regional elections. It was dissolved ahead of the 2024 Basque regional election as Ezker Anitza joined Sumar, though the Podemos–AV candidacy chose to retain the "Elkarrekin" name and branding.

The last leader of the electoral alliance and spokesperson of the Podemos–United Left–Green Alliance Parliamentary Group in the Basque Parliament was Miren Gorrotxategi.

== History ==
The coalition is based on the one formed for the 2016 Spanish general election, in which the Unidos Podemos/Elkarrekin Ahal Dugu coalition became the most voted force in the three Basque districts, also winning in number of seats. Given the coalition success, the three parties agreed to re-edit the coalition to contest the Basque election scheduled for September 25, 2016.

On 11 August 2016, the three formations ratified the agreement to go jointly to the polls under the Elkarrekin Podemos name. The chosen name is similar to that used for the general election, but instead of separating the Spanish and Basque denominations with a slash (Elkarrekin Ahal Dugu), they chose to join the two denominations into one using a word of each language as a symbol of the linguistic richness of the Basque Country. As candidate for lehendakari they chose Pilar Zabala, who had already been chosen by the bases of Podemos Euskadi in primary elections.

== Composition ==
Party	Notes
We Can (Podemos)	
Plural Left (EzAn–IU)	Left in 2024
Greens Equo (Equo)	Expelled in February 2020.
Green Alliance (AV)	Joined in 2021

== Electoral performance ==
=== Basque Parliament ===
Basque Parliament
Election	Leading candidate	Votes	%	Seats	+/–	Government
2016	Pili Zabala	157,334	14.76 (#3)	11 / 75	11	Opposition
2020	Miren Gorrotxategi	72,113	7.97 (#4)	6 / 75	5	Opposition

== Symbols ==
Logo from August 2016 to June 2018.

Logo from June 2018 to March 2020.

Logo from March 2020 to present.
