= Rosa Martínez (politician) =

Spanish politician (born 1975)

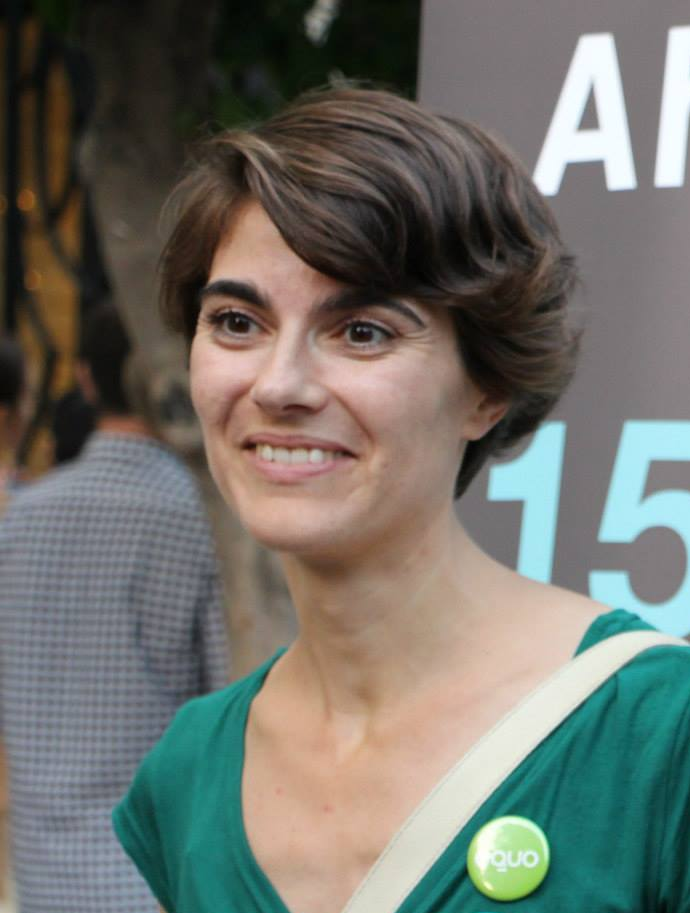
- Martínez in 2015

Member of the Congress of Deputies
- In office 13 January 2016 – 15 February 2019
- Succeeded by: María Carmen Iglesias Camarero
- Constituency: Biscay

Personal details
- Born: 7 August 1975 (age 51)
- Party: Movimiento Sumar (since 2023)

María Rosa Martínez Rodríguez (born 7 August 1975) is a Spanish politician serving as secretary of state for social rights since 2023. From 2016 to 2019, she was a member of the Congress of Deputies.
