= Lander Martínez =

Spanish politician (born 1989)

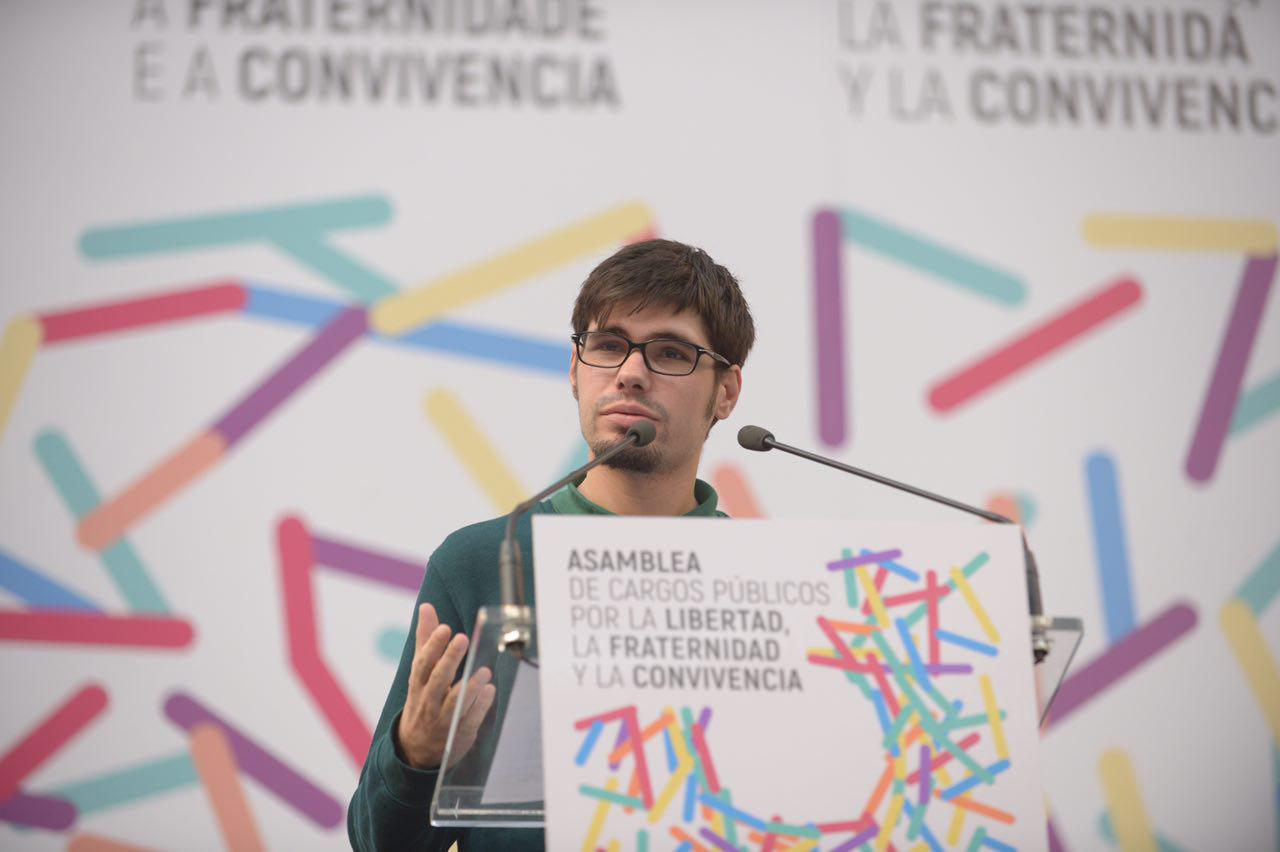
- Martínez in 2017

Member of the Congress of Deputies
- Incumbent
- Assumed office 17 August 2023
- Constituency: Biscay

Personal details
- Born: 6 November 1989 (age 36)
- Party: Sumar Mugimendua (since 2023)

Lander Martínez Hierro (born 6 November 1989) is a Spanish politician serving as a member of the Congress of Deputies since 2023. From 2016 to 2020, he was a member of the Basque Parliament.
