= Electronic literature publishers, journals, and collections =

List of joirnals and publishers of electronic literature

Electronic literature is a literary genre defined as “born digital” works that use computational media to create artistic literary effects with an expanded repertoire that goes well beyond words.

See the overall links to electronic literature authors, critics, resources, and works.

== Publishers, journals, and collections ==
- Afsnit P was a Danish online journal and exhibition space for electronic literature and digital art (1999-2009)
- BeeHive, edited by Talan Memmott
- Cauldron and Net
- CELL: The Consortium on Electronic Literature is a network of databases of electronic literature allowing search across platforms
- Dichtung Digital, a German online journal for literary criticism of electronic literature edited by Roberto Simanowski
- The Digital Review is an annual publication of literary criticism of electronic literature/born digital works.
- Drunken Boat is an electronic journal of arts and hypertext. The journal won a Webby Award at the South by Southwest Festival.
- Eastgate Systems / Mark Bernstein
- Kontradiktion, a biannual Swedish-Finnish online journal for digital, experimental and visual poetry, established in 2022
- The Electronic Literature Organization has collected notable works of electronic literature in four collections.
- The Electronic Literature Knowledge Base (ELMCIP) is a research resource for electronic literature based at the University of Bergen, with 3,851 entries as of September 2, 2022.
- GEODES is an anthology for geolocated (locative) works.
- New Media Writing Prize has an archive of submitted works.
- The New River Anthology, A Journal of Digital Art and Literature has been publishing electronic literature continually since 1996, collected in The NEXT Museum.
- The NEXT Museum, Library, and Preservation Space at Washington State University at Vancouver is a project dedicated to preserving and sharing electronic literature. Traversals was an earlier compendium of authors reading obsolete electronic works
- Nokturno is a Finnish online journal that publishes electronic literature.
- Revue BleuOrange was a French-Canadian journal run by NT2 that published electronic literature works and criticism from 2008 to 2021.
- Riding the Meridian
- trAce, Online Writing Centre's journal, frAme, issued 34 works of electronic literature in 6 issues of its journal, frAme. which is now restored at the Washington State University's NeXt Museum.
- Turbulence was a new media journal from 1996 to 2006.
- Indian Electronic Literature Anthology Volume I, curated and edited by Nirmala Menon, Shanmugapriya T, Justy Joseph, and Deborah Sutton, showcases a collection of 17 distinctive electronic literary works. It was published in 2024.

== Landmark reviews ==
- Robert Coover, 1993 New York Times Book Review, "Hyperfiction: Novels for the Computer"
- Robert Coover, August 29, 1993 New York Times Book Review, "Hyperfiction; And Now, Boot Up the Reviews"

== Critical academic studies ==
Electronic Book Review has critical essays and reviews focusing on electronic literature.

- J. Yellowlees Douglas. 2000. The End of Books or Books without End?
- Caterina Davinio, Tecno-Poesia e realtà virtuali (Techno-Poetry and Virtual Realities), Preface by Eugenio Miccini, Collection Archivio della Poesia del '900, Sometti, Mantova, 2002.
- N Katherine Hayles. 2002. Writing Machines
- Judy Malloy. 2003.Women, Art, and Technology
- Peter Gendolla, Jörgen Schäfer (eds.). 2007. The Aesthetics of Net Literature. Writing, Reading and Playing in Programmable Media. Bielefeld: Transcript, 2007.
- George Landow. 2006. Hypertext 3.0.
- N. Katherine Hayles,. 2008. Electronic Literature: New Horizons for the Literary. Notre Dame: University of Notre Dame Press
- Alice Bell .2010. The Possible Worlds of Hypertext Fiction
- Azzurra Collas, Susy Decosta, Atmaxenia Ghia, Sunrise Jefferson, Asian Lednev, Margye Ryba, Piega Tuqiri, Aldous Writer, MacEwan Writer. 2010. La Torre di Asian - Concept book di Fabio Fornasari sul romanzo collettivo La Torre di Asian, a cura di Lorenza Colicigno, Fabio Fornasari, Giuseppe Iannicelli, Tipografia Tonelli Bologna, gennaio
- Jörgen Schäfer, Peter Gendolla (eds.), 2010. Beyond the Screen. Transformations of Literary Structures, Interfaces and Genres. Bielefeld: Transcript,
- Roberto Simanowski, Jörgen Schäfer, Peter Gendolla (eds.), Reading Moving Letters. Digital Literature in Research and Teaching: A Handbook. Bielefeld: Transcript, 2010.
- Giovanna Di Rosario. 2011. OLE Officina di Letteratura Elettronica - Lavori del Convegno, Atelier Multimediale edizioni, Napoli
- Markku Eskelinen. 2012. Cybertext Poetics: The Critical Landscape of New Media Literary Theory.
- Hartmut Koenitz et al. 2015. Interactive Digital narrative: History, Theory, and Practice.
- Joseph Tabbi, ed. 2018. The Bloomsbury Handbook of Electronic Literature, Bloomsbury Press, London.
- Scott Rettberg. 2018. Electronic Literature. Cambridge: Polity Press
- Astrid Ensslin and Alice Bell. 2021. Digital Fiction and the Unnatural: Transmedial Narrative Theory, Method, and Analysis
- Astrid Ensslin. 2022. Pre-web Digital Publishing and the Lore of Electronic Literature
- Roderick Coover examines electronic literature works.

== Other languages ==
LITERATURA ELECTRONICA ITALIANA. FRAGMENTOS DE COSAS EN CÓDIGO.
