= Carlos Fernández Liria =

Spanish philosopher (b. 1959)

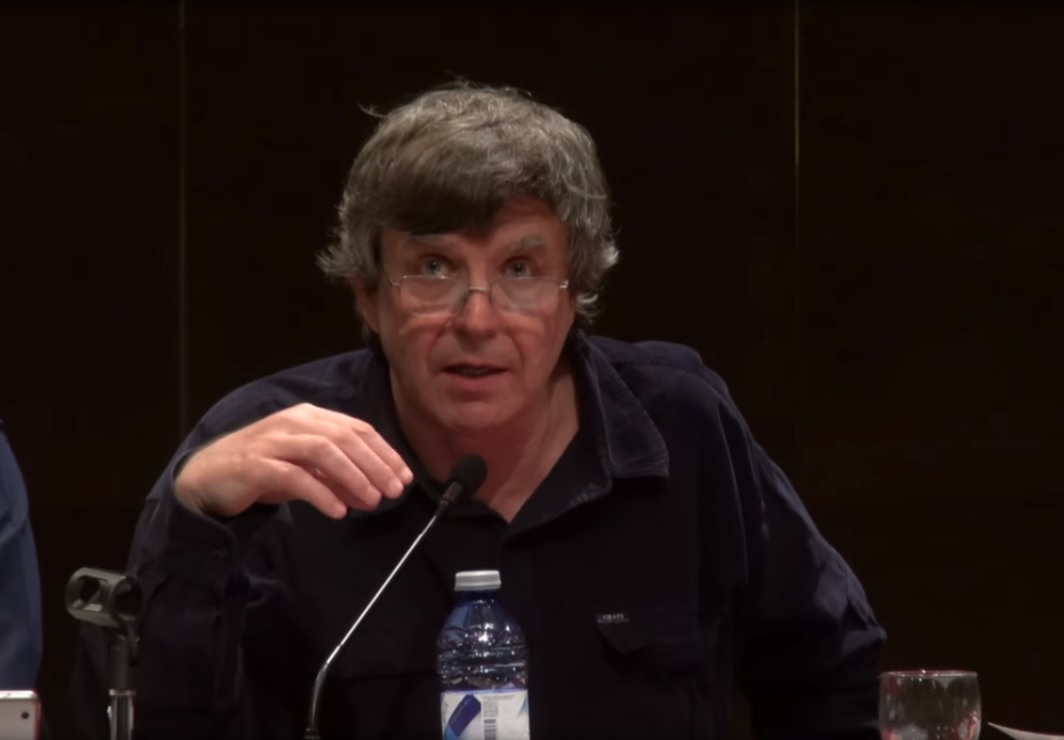
- Born: 1959; Zaragoza
- Alma mater: Complutense University of Madrid; Complutense University of Madrid
- Occupation: Philosopher and academic
- Children: Eduardo Rubiño

Carlos Fernández Liria (born 1959) is a Spanish philosopher and lecturer at the Complutense University of Madrid (UCM).

== Biography ==
He was born in 1959 in Zaragoza. Fernández Liria, who started his teaching experience as professor of secondary education, also worked as TV writer alongside fellow philosopher Santiago Alba in the 1980s, developing the scripts for the cult children's show La Bola de Cristal. Following the earning of a PhD in philosophy at the UCM, reading a dissertation about Jean-Paul Sartre in 1987 titled Una ontología positiva. Ensayo a partir de “El ser y la nada” de Sartre supervised by Sergio Rábade Romeo (initiated under the supervision of Gabriel Albiac), he became a senior lecturer at the former university in 1989.

He has been the doctoral supervisor of, among others, César Rendueles and Luis Alegre.

He is the father of Eduardo Fernández Rubiño, politician and activist.

== Political positions ==
Fernández Liria self-identifies as Marxist "since forever". He has stood out as staunch supporter of the Bolivarian Revolution in Venezuela. An admirer of Julio Anguita, he lent support to Podemos in the beginnings of the party; the purpose of his work En defensa del populismo, in which he outlines a reinterpretation of the Enlightenment and Rousseau, has been described as essentially an apology of the party. Later, in 2019, he removed support from Podemos and endorsed Más Madrid and Más País instead along his disciple Luis Alegre. (Note: Fernández Liria actually stood as candidate in the Más Madrid list (#27) vis-à-vis the 2019 Madrilenian regional election.)

== Works ==
Author

- — (1998). El materialismo. Madrid: Síntesis.
- — (2012). ¿Para qué servimos los filósofos?. Madrid: La Catarata.
- — (2015). El marxismo hoy. La herencia de Gramsci y Althusser. Madrid: Bonalletra Alcompas.
- — (2016). En defensa del populismo. Madrid: Catarata.

Coauthor

- Fernández Liria, Carlos; Alba Rico, Santiago (1986). Dejar de pensar.
- Fernández Liria, Carlos; Alba Rico, Santiago (1989). Volver a pensar.
- Fernández Liria, Carlos; Alegre Zahonero, Luis (2006). Comprender Venezuela, pensar la democracia. El colapso moral de los intelectuales occidentales. Hondarribia: Hiru.
- Fernández Liria, Carlos; Fernández Liria, Pedro; Alegre Zahonero, Luis (2007). Educación para la ciudadanía. Democracia, capitalismo y Estado de Derecho. Akal.
- Fernández Liria, Carlos; Alba Rico, Santiago (2010). El naufragio del hombre. Hondarribia: Hiru.
- Fernández Liria, Carlos; Alegre Zahonero, Luis (2010). El orden de El Capital. Madrid: Akal.
- Fernández Liria, Carlos; García Fernández, Olga; Galindo Ferrández, Enrique (2017). Escuela o Barbarie. Entre el neoliberalismo salvaje y el delirio de la izquierda. Madrid: Akal.
