= List of journals publishing electronic literature =

This is a list of literary journals and magazines that publish electronic literature and digital poetry. The list includes journals that are no longer active. As scholars have noted, few journals of electronic literature are sustained over a long time.

- Drunken Boat (literary magazine)
- Afsnit P - Danish online journal publishing Nordic poets and artists (1999–2009)
- Hyperrhiz: New Media Cultures, edited by Helen Burgess.
- Kontradiktion - Swedish-Finnish online journal publishing digital, experimental and visual poetry (2022-)
- Electronic Book Review - American online journal primarily publishing literary criticism and some creative works (1999-)
- Dichtung Digital - German online journal established in May 1999 by Roberto Simanowski and closed in 2014.
- netzliteratur.net - German online journal
- Nokturno (literary magazine) - Finnish online journal
