= Luis Alegre Zahonero =

Spanish politician

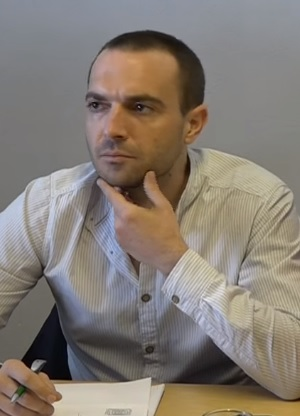
- Zahonero in 2015

Secretary General of Podemos- Community of Madrid
- In office 14 February 2015 – November 2016
- Succeeded by: Ramón Espinar

Secretary of Internal Participation of Podemos
- Incumbent
- Assumed office 15 November 2014

Personal details
- Born: 16 March 1977 (age 49) Madrid, Spain
- Party: Podemos
- Occupation: Professor in the UCM
- Profession: Philosopher

Luis Alegre Zahonero (born 16 March 1977) is a Spanish philosopher and writer, a professor in the Complutense University of Madrid, and a founding member of Podemos.

== Biography ==
Luis Alegre is a researcher and professor of philosophy in the Complutense University of Madrid. He is a disciple of Carlos Fernández Liria, also a philosophy lecturer at the university, with whom he has collaborated on several magazines and alternative media sites such as El Viejo Topo, Viento Sur and Rebelion.org.

Alegre and Fernandez Liria have written several books together, most notably The Order of Capital, which won the Liberator Prize for Critical Thinking in 2010. This award, granted by the Ministry of Culture in Venezuela, rewarded the winners with a $150,000 purse. Other books written by the pair include Education for Citizenship, Democracy, Capitalism and the Rule of Law; Understand Venezuela, Think Democracy ; Philosophy and Citizenship; Ethico-Civic Education; and Education for Citizenship.

In June 2015 Alegre was assigned third place on a list of the 50 most influential homosexuals of Spain, compiled by La Otra Crónica of El Mundo.

== Political activity ==
Luis Alegre has belonged since 1992 to various left-wing political organizations. He actively participated in the student movement against the commodification of his university from 1999 to 2002. He was a member of the Alternative Space party, which subsequently led to Anticapitalistas.

He served on the executive council of the Foundation Center for Political and Social Studies (CEPS Foundation). Later he became head of communications within the leadership of Podemos. After the European Parliament elections of 2014, he was elected as coordinator of the task group that organized the "Yes we can" Citizens' Assembly, held at the Palacio Vistalegre, where he was one of five speakers (along with Pablo Iglesias, Íñigo Errejón, Juan Carlos Monedero, and Carolina Bescansa) from among the founding members of Podemos. At the end of this assembly, Luis Alegre was elected as a member of the Citizens' Council and of the State Executive of the party.

In February 2015, he was elected as Secretary General of the party in the Community of Madrid. He announced in November 2015 that he would not be on the list of Podemos candidates for the forthcoming General Election, preferring to remain in his university post.
