= Eduardo Rubiño =

Spanish politician

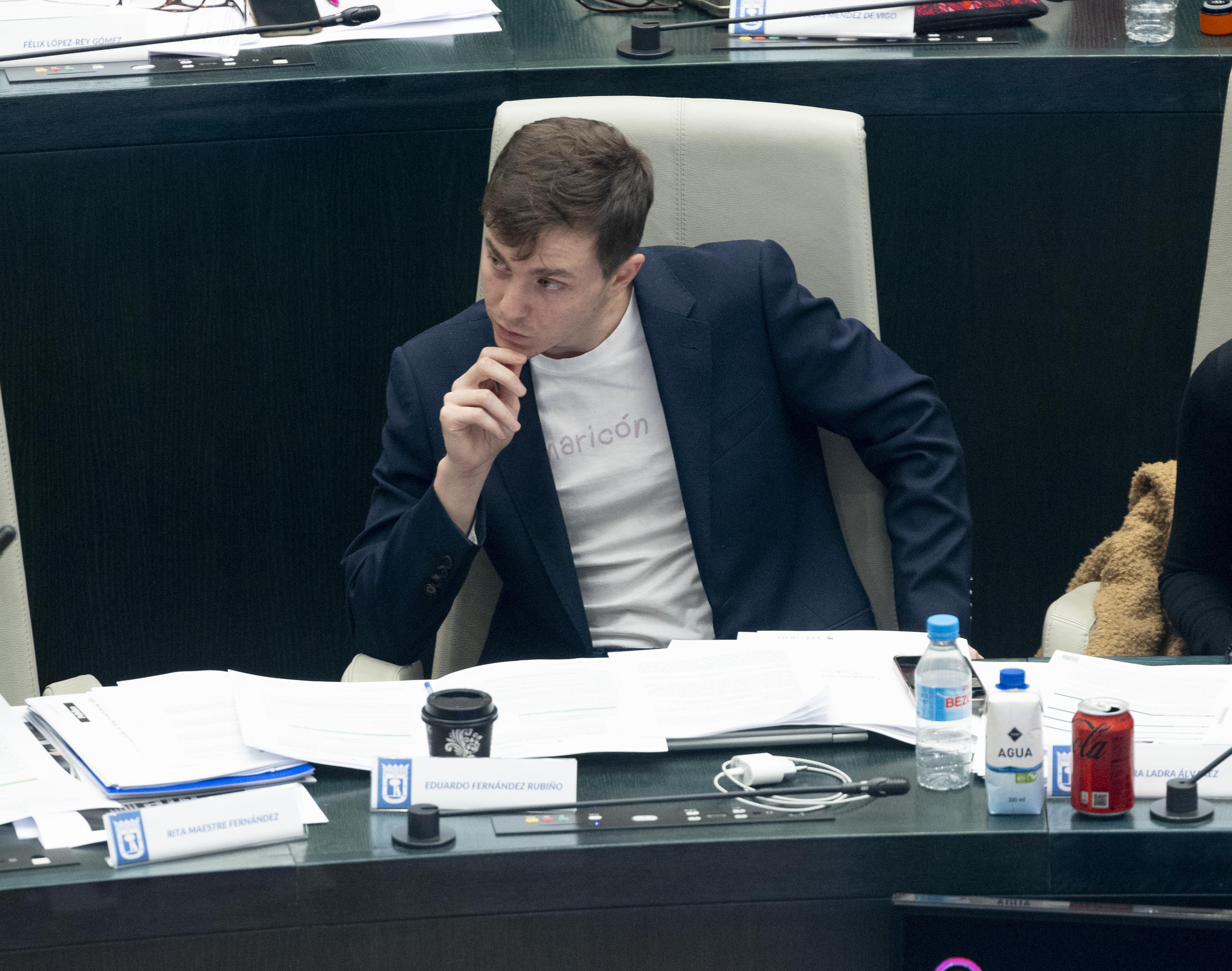
- Rubiño in 2023

City councillor of Madrid
- Incumbent
- Assumed office 17 June 2023

Member of the Senate of Spain
- In office 11 July 2019 – 12 July 2021
- Succeeded by: Pablo Gómez Perpinyá
- Constituency: Madrid

Member of the Assembly of Madrid
- In office 9 June 2015 – 13 June 2023

Personal details
- Born: Eduardo Fernández Rubiño; September 13, 1991 (age 35) Madrid, Spain
- Party: Más Madrid
- Education: Complutense University of Madrid

Eduardo Fernández Rubiño (born 13 September 1991) is a Spanish activist, politician, member of the Assembly of Madrid and former member of the Senate of Spain.

== Early life ==
Rubiño was born on 13 September 1991 in Madrid. He is the son of philosopher and academic Carlos Fernández Liria. He has a degree in philosophy from the Complutense University of Madrid (UCM). He was a member of the Central Delegation of Students (Delegación Central de Estudiantes) at UCM. He was an LGBT student and Youthless Future (Juventud Sin Futuro) activist. He was one of the leaders of the 15-M anti-austerity movement at UCM.

== Career ==
Rubiño worked as a community manager. He was responsible for social networking for Podemos from 2014 to 2017. He was an online communication advisor to MEP Pablo Iglesias Turrión. He contributed to Iglesias' 2014 book Ganar o Morir: Lecciones Políticas en Juego de Tronos.

Rubiño contested the 2015 regional election as a Podemos candidate in the Community of Madrid and was elected to the Assembly of Madrid. Following the schism between Iglesias and Íñigo Errejón, Rubiño joined Errejón's Más Madrid. He was re-elected at the 2019 regional election and the 2021 Madrilenian regional election.

In July 2019 Rubiño was appointed to the Senate of Spain by the Assembly of Madrid. He left this position in July 2021.

== Personal life ==
Rubiño is openly gay. In June 2018 he was subject to homophobic abuse at Lavapiés Metro station when, whilst hugging his boyfriend, someone shouted "fucking fag" (maricón de mierda).

== Electoral history ==
Electoral history of Eduardo Rubiño
Election	Constituency	Party	No.	Result
2015 regional	Community of Madrid	Podemos	27	Elected
2019 regional	Community of Madrid	Más Madrid	13	Elected
2021 regional	Community of Madrid	Más Madrid	14	Elected
