= Afsnit P =

Afsnit P was a Danish online literary journal and virtual exhibition space for electronic literature and internet art. It was active from 1999 to 2009, and the online continuation of a physical bookshop that was run by the poet C.Y. Frostholm in Nansens gade in Copenhagen. Frostholm co-founded Afsnit P with Karen Wagner and Charlotte Hansen. Other members of the editorial board included Andreas Brøgger, Martin Deichmann and Peter Kirkhoff Eriksen. The "P" stood for poetry, inclusing both 'poesis' and 'pictura'.

Afsnit P's website was discontinued in 2025, but versions of the website can be accessed at the Internet Archive and at Frostholm's personal web archive.

== Works published ==
Afsnit P curated the work of Danish authors and artists including Tom Kristensen, Robert Corydon, Jørgen Sonne, Simon Grotrian, Morten Søndergaard, Mette Moestrup, Hans Sydow, Jasper Sebastian Stürup, Kristofer Hultenberg, as well as Norwegian poets like Ottar Ormstad and Monica Aasprong, Swedish poets Johannes Heldén and Oskar Ponnert, the Finnish-Swedish Cia Rinne, the American Lewis Koch, the French Franck Mouteault and the British David Bellingham.

== Legacy ==
Afsnit P was a pioneer in bringing early digital poetry, internet art and electronic literature to a broader audience in the Nordic region, and its importance has been recognised both in the Danish National Lexicon and by scholars of electronic literature and digital design. Hilda Forss and Jolin Slotte cited Afsnit P as an inspiration for founding the Swedish-Finnish journal of digital, experimental and visual poetry Kontradiktion in 2022.
