= Drunken Boat (literary magazine) =

Online literary journal for electronic literature

- Editor: Ravi Shankar
- Circulation: Online
- Founder: Ravi Shankar (poet) and Michael Mills
- Founded: 1999; 27 years ago
- Country: United States
- Based in: Providence, RI
- Language: English
- Website: www.drunkenboat.com

Drunken Boat is one of the first online literary magazines, publishing electronic literature, digital poetry and digital art. It was founded in 1999 by Ravi Shankar and Michael Mills.

== History ==
The magazine website and some other sources state that Drunken Boat was founded in 1999; a few sources say 2000, including an interview with editor Shankar himself. This confusion may also be due to another online literary magazine with almost the same name that started in spring 2000: The Drunken Boat, edited by Rebecca Seiferle. Seiferle's magazine was also online, but published traditional poetry and commentaries, not using multimedia in the way that Shankar and Mills' Drunken Boat did.

From the start, Drunken Boat included multimedia elements, using the possibilities that the internet and the computer gave for new genres of poetry, literature and art. Issues included poetry, sound fields and news about poetry. The journal currently describes its content as including "sound, video, hypertext, digital animation, locative media, web art, interactive fiction - alongside more traditional forms of representation such as poetry, prose, photography, and translation."

Drunken Boat has always been open access, and providing easier access to new literary genres has been a key goal. Along with magazines like The New River and Iowa Review Web, it has had an important role in developing the new genre of electronic literature: digital poems could not be published in traditional print literary magazines.

== See also ==
- Electronic literature
- List of literary magazines
- List of journals publishing electronic literature
