= Finnish-Swedish =

Finnish-Swedish or Swedish-Finnish may refer to:

- Finland–Sweden relations, i.e. anything binational that involves both Finland and Sweden, e.g. a person who has dual citizenship of Finland and Sweden
- Finnish-Swedish ice class, a ship ice navigation capability class

== See also ==
- , Swedish-Finnish, Finland–Sweden or Sweden–Finland
- Swedish-speaking Finns, a Swedish-speaking linguistic minority in Finland
  - Finland Swedish, a dialect of Swedish spoken by them
- Sweden Finns, a national minority of Finnish descent in Sweden
  - Sweden Finnish, a variety of Finnish spoken by them
