= César Rendueles =

Spanish sociologist and essayist

- Interview with César Rendueles at Centre de Cultura Contemporània de Barcelona
- Born: 28 November 1975 (age 50); Girona, Catalonia, Spain
- Occupation: Sociologist

César Rendueles Menéndez de Llano (born 28 November 1975, Girona) is a Spanish sociologist and essayist.

== Life ==
Although born in Girona, he grew up in Gijon and lives in Madrid. He holds a Ph.D. in philosophy, was an associate professor at the Carlos III University and visiting professor at the National University of Colombia. He currently teaches sociology at the Complutense University of Madrid. He was a founding member of the cultural intervention group Ladinamo, which edited the magazine of the same name. He directed cultural projects for eight years (2003-2012) at the Circulo de Bellas Artes (Society of Fine Arts) in Madrid. He often writes on epistemology, political philosophy and cultural criticism in specialized journals.

He published two collections of works of Karl Marx: an anthology of Capital and a selection of texts on historical materialism. He also edited classic essays by authors such as Walter Benjamin, Karl Polanyi or Jeremy Bentham and worked as a translator. In 2011 he was curator of the exhibition Walter Benjamin: Constellations. He writes for El País.

His book, Sociophobia: Political change in the era of digital utopia (2013) had a great impact and was selected as one of ten books of the year by the newspaper El País. In it the author questions, among other things, the importance of social networks and the Internet in political action; in fact, its effect is solvent and generates a decreased social reality, not increased, lowering expectations for what can be expected from political intervention or personal relationships. He questions, first, the ideological consensus regarding the ability of communication technologies to induce positive social dynamics. Secondly, he makes an analysis of capitalist society as a system that is destructive of community relations and puts isolated citizens at the center of political redemption. Concepts like cyberfetishism or digital mirage are derived from this way of thinking.

== Bibliography ==
- Sociophobia: Political Change in the Digital Utopia, translated by Heather Cleary, foreword by Roberto Simanowski, Columbia University Press, NYC 2017, ISBN 978-023117527-2.
- Capitalismo canalla. Una historia personal del capitalismo a través de la literatura, Seix Barral 2015
- En bruto. Una reivindicación del materialismo histórico, Los Libros de la Catarata 2016, ISBN 978-84-9097-172-7.
- Los bienes comunes. ¿Opportunidad o espejismo? (mit Joan Subirats), Icaria Editorial 2016, ISBN 978-84-9888-736-5.
