= Ediciones Akal =

Spanish publisher

- Status: Active
- Founded: 1972
- Founder: Ramón Akal González
- Country of origin: Spain
- Headquarters location: Madrid
- Fiction genres: Literature and essay
- Official website: https://www.akal.com

Ediciones Akal is a Spanish publisher founded in Madrid in 1972 by Ramón Akal González. It consists of a catalogue of three thousand works in forty collections which includes fields like Humanities, classic texts, modern literature, etc., and a collection of dictionaries.

Grupo Akal belong to Istmo, Foca, H. Blume and Siglo XXI de España Editores, acquired in 2010. Grupo Akal has more than 70 employees in 2015.

It received the Premio Nacional for Mejor Labor Editorial Cultural in 2010.
