= Kontradiktion =

Nordic literary journal publishing digital, experimental and visual poetry

- Editor: Anders E. Larsson, Jolin Slotte, Hilda Forss
- Categories: electronic literature, digital poetry
- Frequency: biannual
- Circulation: Online
- Founder: Hilda Forss and Jolin Slotte
- Founded: 2022; 4 years ago
- Country: Nordic coverage
- Based in: Finland
- Language: Swedish, Finnish, Norwegian, Danish and English
- Website: kontradiktion.fi

Kontradiktion is an online literary journal that publishes Nordic digital poetry, experimental poetry and visual poetry. It is Swedish-Finnish, but accepts poetry in all the Nordic languages as well as English. It was founded in 2022 by Hilda Forss and Jolin Slotte. As of 2026, the editors are Anders E. Larsson and Jolin Slotte, while Hilda Forss is the visual editor.

== History ==
The journal was founded in 2022 by Hilda Forss and Jolin Slotte, and launched at the Helsinki Book Fair that October.

The founding editors both have PhDs in comparative literature, and Slotte is also a novelist. The idea for the journal was born when Slotte was looking for material for a lecture on electronic literature, and asked Forss, whose PhD was on the topic. Forss supplied Slotte with links, but the lack of overview frustrated them, especially after the demise of the Danish journal Afsnit P, which has not been active since 2009. Nokturno is a Finnish journal for digital poetry, but only publishes in Finnish, so there was no longer a site for Scandinavian language electronic literature.

Later, Anders E. Larsson joined the team as an editor and is now co-editor with Slotte, while Forss is the visual editor.

== Events ==
Kontradiktion has also hosted events, drawing upon co-editor Hilda Forss's previous experience editing the journal Preses, which experimented with alternative formats, for example "publishing" one issue as a punk rock concert.

== Works published in Kontradiktion ==
The journal's visual design has been described as elegant, and the works published in the first issue generally received good reviews. Authors published by Kontradiktion include Jason Nelson (poet), Danni Storm, Heidi von Wright, Azadé Azad, Anders E. Larsson, Henrika Andersson and others.

The journal has published several works that use LLMs, such as Tianjun Li's Free as Birds (2024), where AI was used to translate folk songs about home and migration so they resemble bird songs, and Anton Hilgindsson's Jag räknar till platsen (2025), where generative AI is used to explore different versions of the text.

== See also ==
- Electronic literature
- Digital poetry
