= Roberto Simanowski =

German scholar (born 1963)

Roberto Simanowski (born 1963) is a German scholar of literature and media studies and founder of dichtung-digital.

Simanowski studied German literature and history at the University of Jena where he finished his PhD on mass-culture around 1800 with a grant by the German Studienstiftung in 1996. He worked at the University of Göttingen in the research center Nationality of International Literatures in 1997 and 1998, conducted his research project Cyberspace and Literature with a stipend from the German Humboldt-Foundation at Harvard University 1998 until 2000, was visiting scholar at the University of Washington in Seattle 2001 until 2002, and served as guest professor at the department of media studies at the University of Jena in 2002/2003.

Simanowski was a professor of German literature and culture as well as digital aesthetics at Brown University in Providence, Rhode Island (2003-2010), and professor of media studies at the University of Basel in Switzerland (2010-2013) and at City University of Hong Kong (2014-2017). In 1999 he founded the online-journal dichtung-digital.org, a Journal of art and culture in digital media, that he edited until 2014 when it contained about 450 contributions by over 100 scholars and artists from 20 countries. Simanowski works as author and media consultant in Berlin and Rio de Janeiro and is currently Distinguished Fellow of Global Literary Studies am Excellence-Cluster "Temporal Communities" at Freie Universität Berlin. His book Todesalgorithmus. Das Dilemma der künstlichen Intelligenz (Wien: Passagen Verlag 2020) received the Tractatus Award for best philosophical essay in German in 2020. His book Sprachmaschinen. Eine Philosophie der künstlichen Intelligenz was shortlisted for the German Non-Fiction Book-Prize (Deutscher Sachbuchpreis) 2026. The book was included in the ZEIT edition 'Wendepunkte' ('Turning Points') 2026.

== Book publications ==
- Sprachmaschinen. Eine Philosophie der künstlichen Intelligenz (Language Machines. A Philosophy of Artificial Intelligence), München: C.H.Beck 2025 (7th. edition 2026)
- Das Verschwinden von Raum und Zeit im Prozess ihrer Digitalisierung (The disappearance of space and time in the process of their digitalization), Wien: Passagen Verlag 2023, 136 pp. ISBN 978-3-7092-0560-0
- Digitale Revolution und Bildung. Für eine zukunftsfähige Medienkompetenz (Digital Revolution and Education. Towards a sustainable media literacy), Weinheim: Beltz 2021, 103 pp. ISBN 978-3-7799-6511-4
- Das Virus und das Digitale, Wien: Passagen Verlag 2021, 133 pp. ISBN 978-3-7092-0463-4
- Todesalgorithmus. Das Dilemma der künstlichen Intelligenz, Wien: Passagen Verlag 2020 (Tractatus award for best philosophical essay in German in 2020). ISBN 978-3709204177
- Sozialmaschine Facebook. Dialog über das politisch Unverbindliche, together with Ramón Reichert, Berlin: Matthes & Seitz 2019, ISBN 978-3-95757-756-6
- The Death Algorithm and Other Digital Dilemmas, Cambridge, MA, London: MIT Press 2018 (CHOICE Award for outstanding academic titles 2019), ISBN 978-0-262-53637-0
- Waste. A New Media Primer. Cambridge, MA: MIT Press 2018. ISBN 978-0-262-53627-1
- Facebook Society. Losing Ourselves in Sharing Ourselves. New York: Columbia University Press 2018. ISBN 9780231182720
- Stumme Medien – Vom Verschwinden der Computer in Bildung und Gesellschaft. Berlin: Matthes & Seitz 2018. ISBN 978-3-95757-521-0
- Digital Humanities and Digital Media. Conversations on Politics, Culture, Aesthetics, and Literacy. London: Open Humanities Press 2016. ISBN 978-1-78542-030-6
- Data Love. The Seduction and Betrayal of Digital Technologies. Columbia University Press 2016. ISBN 978-0-231-17726-9
- Textmaschinen - Kinetische Poesie - Interaktive Installation. Zum Verstehen von Kunst in digitalen Medien, Bielefeld: Transcript 2012. ISBN 978-3-89942-976-3
- Digital Art and Meaning. Reading Kinetic Poetry, Text Machines, Mapping Art, and Interactive Installations, University of Minnesota Press 2011. ISBN 978-0-8166-6738-3
- Reading Moving Letters: Digital Literature in Research and Teaching. A Handbook (Mitherausgeber), Bielefeld: Transcript 2010. ISBN 978-3-8376-1130-4
- Digitale Medien in der Erlebnisgesellschaft. Kultur - Kunst - Utopien [Digital Media in the Society of Event: Culture, Art, Utopia], Reinbek bei Hamburg: Rowohlt, 2008.
- Transmedialität. Studien zu paraliterarischen Verfahren [Transmediality. On Para-literary Procedures] (Coeditor), Göttingen: Wallstein-Verlag 2006.
- Interfictions. Vom Schreiben im Netz [Interfictions. Writing in the Net], Frankfurt am Main: Edition Suhrkamp 2002.
- Literatur.digital. Formen und Wege einer neuen Literatur [Literature Digital. Present and Future of a New Literature] (Editor), Deutscher Taschenbuch Verlag 2002.
- Digitale Literatur [Digital Literature] (Coeditor), Text & Kritik: Nr. 152/October 2001.
- Europa - ein Salon? Beiträge zur Internationalität des literarischen Salons [The Internationality of the Literary Salon: Contributions to an Historical Typology] (Coeditor, Göttingen: Wallstein Verlag 1999.
- Kulturelle Grenzziehungen im Spiegel der Literaturen: Nationalismus, Regionalismus, Fundamentalismus [Drawing Cultural Borders in the Mirror of Literature: Nationalism, Regionalism, Fundamentalism] (Coeditor), Göttingen: Wallstein Verlag 1998.
- Die Verwaltung des Abenteuers'. Massenkultur um 1800 am Beispiel Christian August Vulpius [Administration of Adventure: Mass-Culture around 1800], Göttingen: Vandenhoeck & Ruprecht 1998.
