= Autonomous Front =

Autonomous Front Frente Autonómico
- Founded: 1977
- Dissolved: 1977
- Ideology: Basque autonomism
- Political position: Big tent
- Members: See list of members

The Autonomous Front (Spanish: Frente Autonómico) was an electoral alliance formed by the Basque Nationalist Party (PNV), the Socialist Party of the Basque Country (PSE) and Socialists' Unification of the Basque Country (ESEI) to contest the 1977 Spanish Senate election in the Basque Country and Navarre. The main goal was to negotiate the establishment of a four province basque autonomous community.

== Composition ==
Party
Basque Nationalist Party (EAJ/PNV)
Socialist Party of the Basque Country (PSE–PSOE)
Socialists' Unification of the Basque Country (ESEI)

The coalition also included various independent candidates.

== Results ==
The list won in Álava, Gipuzkoa and Biscay the coalition won the election, with all 9 candidates being elected. In Navarre the front only managed to elect one senator, the historial nationalist Manuel de Irujo.

=== Elected senators ===
- Álava: Luis Alberto Aguiriano (PSE-PSOE), Ramón Bajo (independent) and Ignacio Oregui (EAJ-PNV).
- Gipuzkoa: Federico Zabala (EAJ-PNV), Gregorio Monreal (ESEI) and Enrique Iparraguirre (PSE-PSOE)
- Navarre : Manuel de Irujo (EAJ-PNV)
- Biscay: Mitxel Unzueta (EAJ-PNV), Juan María Vidarte (independent) and Ramón Rubial (PSE-PSOE).
