= Eva Forest =

Spanish activist and writer

- Forest in 1951
- Born: 6 April 1928; Barcelona, Spain
- Died: 19 May 2007 (aged 79); Hondarribia, Spain
- Spouse: Alfonso Sastre (m. 1955)
- Writing career
- Pen name: Julen Agirre
- Genre: Political literature

Member of the Senate of Spain
- In office 13 May 1992 – 13 April 1993
- Constituency: Gipuzkoa

Personal details
- Party: Herri Batasuna

Genoveva Forest Tarrat (6 April 1928 – 19 May 2007) was a Spanish far-left activist, writer and prisoner. Born into an anarchist family in Barcelona, she studied medicine in Madrid. During the 1970s, she supported the Basque terrorist organization ETA in their resistance to the government of dictator Francisco Franco. From 1974 to 1977, she was imprisoned for complicity in the Cafetería Rolando bombing (1974), which killed 13 people in Madrid. After Spain's transition to democracy, she served a term as a senator from 1992 until 1993. The wife of the Spanish writer Alfonso Sastre, she died in May 2007.

Forest's writings were political in nature. Her best known books include Operación Ogro: Cómo y por qué ejecutamos a Carrero Blanco (1974), an account of the assassination of the Spanish Prime Minister admiral-general Luis Carrero Blanco by ETA, and Testimonios de lucha y resistencia (1976), a testimony to the situation of political prisoners and the use of torture. Her first narrative text, Onintze en el país de la democracia (1985), is a fictional account of political violence under a democratic regime.

== Early life and education ==
Eva Forest was born in April 1928 in Barcelona. Her parents were anarchists who considered the institution of schooling to be oppressive; accordingly, they did not enroll their daughter in formal education until the end of the Spanish Civil War in 1939. In 1950, she moved to Madrid to study medicine. There she met her future husband, the writer and critic of the Francoist government Alfonso Sastre. Having been arrested in the 1956 university protests, Sastre and Forest fled to Paris where they lived in exile until 1962.

== Activism ==
After her return from France, Forest led a women's demonstration supporting the Asturian miners' strike of 1962, and was imprisoned for a month upon refusing to pay the resulting fine. Having visited Cuba in 1966, she began both her career as a writer as well as an organisational activist: she published a book about Cuba (Los Nuevos Cubanos) and founded a solidary committee for the island nation, followed by two illicit bulletins. During this period, she joined the illegal Communist Party of Spain.

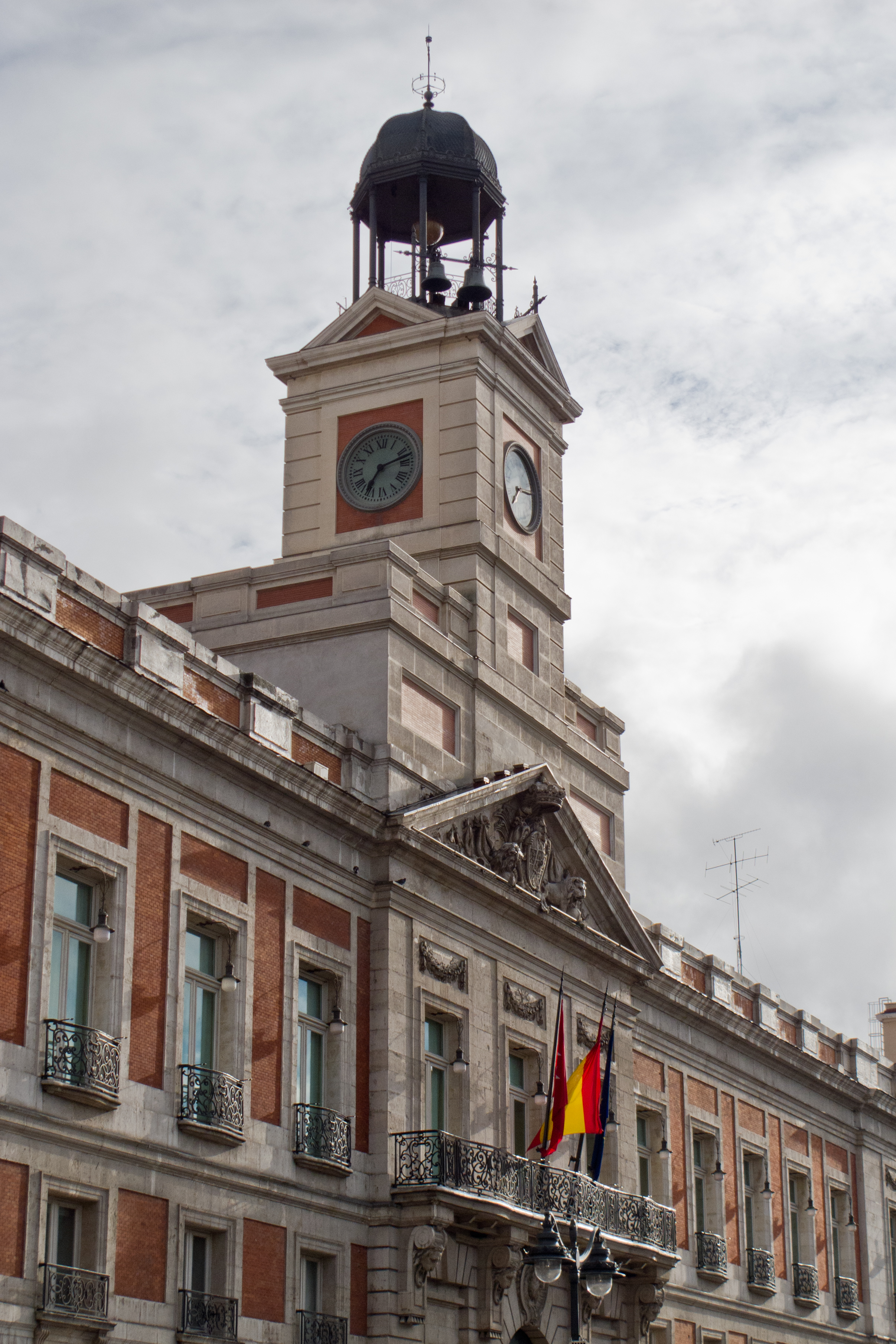
The Real Casa de Correos in Madrid, former location of the Dirección General de Seguridad. The building is near the site of the 1974 terrorist attack for which Forest was imprisoned.

In the early 1970s, Forest became increasingly involved in the affairs of the Basque armed organization ETA. She founded a solidarity group for those members of the organization who were subject to controversial death sentences at the Burgos trials (1970). In 1974, having been approached by ETA, she published a book about the assassination of Luis Carrero Blanco, then Prime Minister of Spain and confidant of the Spanish dictator Francisco Franco, (Operación Ogro) under the pseudonym Julen Agirre. Sympathetic to the goal of Basque national liberation, the book was one of the reasons which led to Forest being imprisoned in the same year for complicity in the Cafetería Rolando bombing in Madrid which they killed 13 innocent civilians near the Dirección General de Seguridad, a government department responsible for policing. Her imprisonment in the women's prison at Yeserías, during which she suffered "interrogation and torture", lasted from 1974 to 1977. After her release, she and her husband settled in Hondarribia in the Basque Country and continued to support the cause of Basque independence now within Herri Batasuna, a far-left Basque political party.

The extent of her complicity in the actions of ETA remains controversial. Juan María Bandrés, the Basque lawyer and politician who represented Forest during her imprisonment, has expressed doubt about the veracity of such allegations. In his view, she was not "directly [or] consciously" involved in the 1974 bombing. In a 2014 episode of the docuseries DossierTM produced by Telemadrid, Forest and Sastre are alleged to have been the principal organisers of the attack. In the documentary, the politician Lidia Falcón, who was imprisoned in the same facility, stated that she had "met [Forest] in a state of euphoria", and that she claimed to have "proposed [to the attackers] that the attack be carried out near the Dirección General de Seguridad."

== Later life ==
In 1991, she and her husband founded the independent publishing house Hiru. The company specialised in editing political texts that would not otherwise have found a publisher. Forest termed these texts "emergency literature". In her later life, Forest also engaged in the party politics that emerged from Spain's transition to democracy. Running for Herri Batasuna, she was elected to the Senate of Spain for the constituency of Gipuzkoa in 1992. She served in this position until 1993. In 2005, she joined the Basque party Herritarren Zerrenda, which was later declared unconstitutional and banned by the Spanish Supreme Court.

She died in May 2007, aged 79, after a long period of illness. She was survived by her husband Alfonso and their three children, Juan, Pablo and Eva.

== Literary work ==
Forest's writings, focused on political themes, were concerned with the resistance to Spain's dictatorship, the fight for Basque independence and political violence. Two of her widely known works (Diario y cartas desde la cárcel, 1975 and Testimonios de lucha y resistencia, 1976) are testimonies to her experience in prison and suffering torture. Her book on the assassination of Luis Carrero Blanco (Operación Ogro: Cómo y por qué ejecutamos a Carrero Blanco, 1974) sheds light on ETA's motives and tactics in carrying out the act. Her first attempt at narrative writing, Onintze en el país de la democracia (1985), is a fictional account of political violence under a democratic regime.

== Selected publications ==
- Forest, Eva (1974). Operación Ogro: Cómo y por qué ejecutamos a Carrero Blanco. Paris. ISBN 978-84-941024-3-1.
- Forest, Eva (1975). Diario y cartas desde la cárcel. Paris. ISBN 978-84-87524-82-0.
- Boissière, Fabrice; Boissière, Francis (1976). Testimonios de lucha y resistencia. Paris. ISBN 978-2-85620-077-3.
- Forest, Eva (1985). Onintze en el país de la democracia. Madrid. ISBN 978-84-96584-03-7.
- Diez años de tortura y democracia. Gestoras pro Amnistía. 1987. ISBN 978-84-404-0712-2.

== Bibliography ==
=== Books ===
- Casanova, Iker; Asensio, Paul (1999). Argala (in Spanish). Tafalla. ISBN 978-84-8136-142-1.
- Castro, Raimundo (1998). Juan María Bandrés: memorias para la paz (in Spanish). Madrid. ISBN 978-84-923433-2-4.

=== Audiovisual sources ===
- Cerdán, Manuel (15 September 2014). DossierTM: Calle del Correo, tras la pista de los asesinos (Television production) (in Spanish).
