= Paula Somalo =

Spanish politician (born 1990)

Member of the Senate
- Incumbent
- Assumed office 23 July 2023
- Constituency: Álava

Personal details
- Born: 1 February 1990 (age 36)
- Party: Spanish Socialist Workers' Party

Paula Alicia Somalo García (born 1 February 1990) is a Spanish politician serving as a member of the Senate since 2023. She is the head of academic planning at the faculty of education of the International University of La Rioja.
