= Marco Aguiriano =

Spanish politician

The Most Excellent Marco Aguiriano
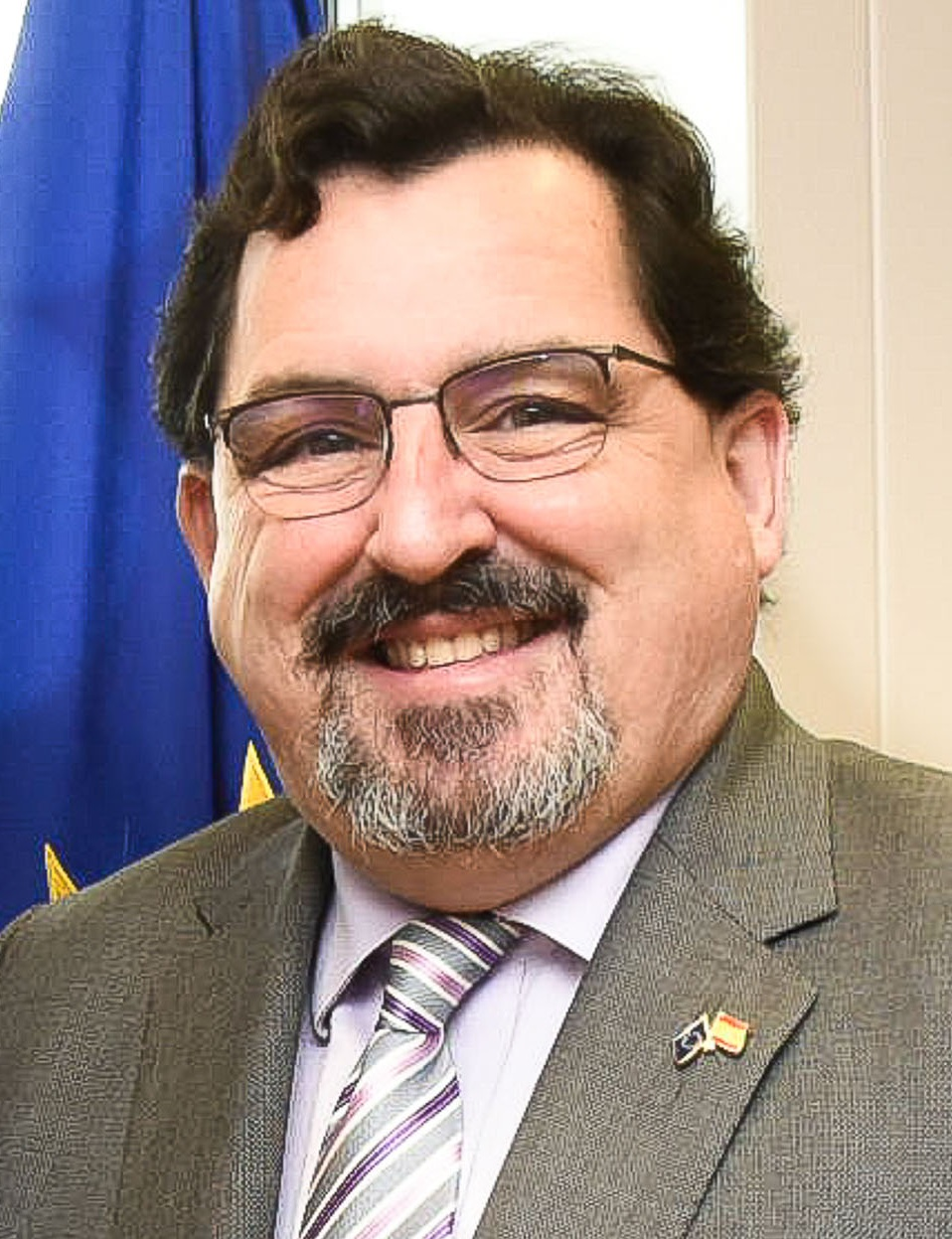

Secretary of State for the European Union
- In office 23 June 2018 – 5 February 2020
- Monarch: Felipe VI
- Prime Minister: Pedro Sánchez
- Preceded by: Jorge Toledo Albiñana
- Succeeded by: Juan González-Barba Pera

Director-General for External Policies of the European Parliament
- In office 1 April 2010 – 23 June 2018
- Preceded by: Dietmar Nickel
- Succeeded by: Pietro Ducci

Member of the European Parliament for Spain
- In office 19 April 2004 – 19 July 2004

Personal details
- Born: Luis Marco Aguiriano Nalda; 27 January 1963 (age 63) Brussels, Belgium
- Party: Socialist Workers' Party
- Education: University of Geneva; Graduate Institute of International Studies; Université libre de Bruxelles

Luis Marco Aguiriano Nalda, known as Marco Aguiriano (born 27 January 1963) is a Spanish politician and European Union civil servant. He served as the 12th Secretary of State for the European Union of the Government of Spain from June 2018 to February 2020.

== Biography ==
Born in Brussels, Aguiriano is the son of José Antonio Aguiriano, an important Socialist Party member from the Basque Country. Aguiriano holds a degree in international relations from the University of Geneva and the Graduate Institute of International Studies and he continued his studies in Brussels, where he got a Master in European Studies in the Free University of Brussels. He speaks seven languages: Spanish (mother tongue), English, French, German, Greek, Italian and Portuguese.

It was during this time that he took contact with the European Parliament. He started there as a trainee and later assistant of the then MEP Enrique Barón, who three years later included him in his Cabinet as adviser from 1989 to 1991 after being appointed President of the European Parliament. Aguiriano was also adviser of EU Parliament President Klaus Hänsch from 1994 to 1997. From 1997 to 2004 he was the Main Advisor of the European Parliament Secretary General Cabinet, Julian Priestley.

In 2004 he started his a political career as replacing Joan Colom Naval who had left the European parliament and became an MEP himself, however, he did not stand as candidat for the elections to the European Parliament in May 2004 but rather assumed the office of Deputy Director of the Cabinet of the President of the European Parliament, Josep Borrell from 2004 to 2007.

On 1 April 2010 he assumed the office of Acting Director-General for External Policies of the Union, within the Secretariat of the European Parliament, and was appointed officially as Director-General in July 2010, a position he held until June 2018.

In June 2018 he accepted the offering of the Foreign Minister, his former boss and former EU Parliament President Josep Borrell to replace Jorge Toledo Albiñana as Secretary of State for the European Union. In February 2020, the new foreign minister Arancha González Laya, appointed Juan González-Barba Pera to replace Aguiriano.

In July 2024, he was awarded with the Grand Cross of the Order of Civil Merit.
