= Luis Alberto Aguiriano =

Spanish politician (1940–2019)

Member of the Congress of Deputies
- In office 15 July 1986 – 18 January 2000
- Constituency: Álava

Member of the Senate
- In office 18 November 1982 – 14 July 1986
- Constituency: Álava
- In office 15 June 1977 – 2 January 1979
- Constituency: Álava

Personal details
- Born: Luis Alberto Aguiriano Forniés; 1 April 1940 Vitoria, Spain
- Died: 23 June 2019 (aged 79) Vitoria-Gasteiz, Spain
- Party: PSOE
- Relatives: José Antonio Aguiriano (brother)

Luis Alberto Aguiriano Forniés (1 April 1940 – 23 June 2019) was a Spanish socialist politician. He served as a senator from 1977 to 1979 and from 1982 to 1986, as well as a member of the Congress of Deputies from 1986 to 2000.

== Biography ==
He was born in Vitoria to a left-wing family which took part in the clandestine reorganization of the Álava branch of the Spanish Socialist Workers' Party during the Francoist dictatorship. José Antonio Aguiriano, who would also become a politician, was his older brother. He was a founding member of the Federación Universitaria Democrática Española, an underground students' union; this led to him being arrested and imprisoned in Bilbao. He was elected to the Senate in the 1977 election, and again in 1982. In 1986 he was elected to the Congress of Deputies, where he served until 2000. He died in Vitoria-Gasteiz on 23 June 2019.
