= José Antonio Aguiriano =

Spanish politician

Government Delegate in the Basque Country
- In office 5 April 1991 – 14 May 1996
- Preceded by: Juan Manuel Eguiagaray
- Succeeded by: Enrique Villar Montero

Second Vice-president of the Basque Parliament
- In office 31 March 1980 – 23 September 1981
- Preceded by: Office established
- Succeeded by: José Antonio Maturana

Member of the Basque Parliament
- In office 31 March 1980 – 23 September 1981
- Constituency: Álava

Member of the Congress of Deputies
- In office 15 June 1977 – 26 March 1980
- Constituency: Álava

Personal details
- Born: José Antonio Aguiriano Forniés; 9 August 1932 Vitoria-Gasteiz, Álava, Spain
- Died: 14 May 1996 (aged 63) Vitoria-Gasteiz, Álava, Spain
- Party: PSOE
- Children: Marco Aguiriano
- Relatives: Luis Alberto Aguiriano (brother)
- Occupation: Politician

José Antonio Aguiriano Forniés (9 August 1932 – 14 May 1996) was a Spanish socialist politician who served during the first and constituent legislatures of the Congress of Deputies, representing Álava. He also was a member of the Basque Parliament between 1980 and 1981.

== Honours ==
- Gold Medal of Merit in Labour (20 June 1984)
- Order of Civil Merit, Grand Cross, 17 May 1996 (posthumous)
