= Alfonso Sastre =

Spanish playwright (1926–2021)

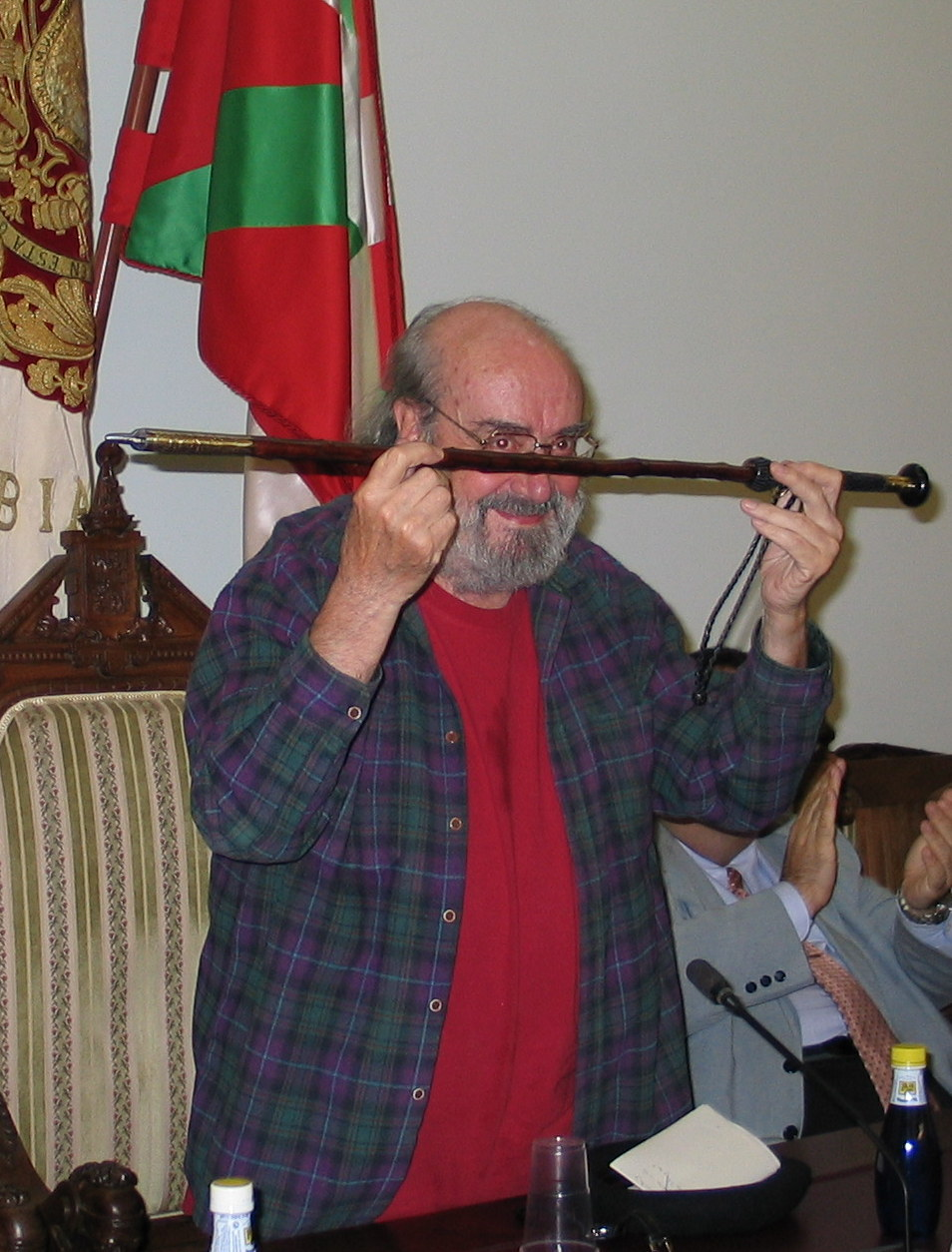

Alfonso Sastre (20 February 1926 – 17 September 2021) was a Spanish playwright, essayist, and critic associated with the Generation of '36 movement. He was an outspoken critic of censorship during the reign of General Francisco Franco and the ensuing political regime arising from the 1978 Constitution altogether. His most noteworthy plays include Death Squad (1953), The Gag (1954), Death Thrust (1960), and Tragicomedy of the Gypsy Celestina (1984).

== Biography ==
Alfonso Sastre was born in Madrid in February 1926 into a typical middle-class family. He had three siblings (Aurora, Ana and Jose), and received a Catholic upbringing. He survived hunger and bombing during the Spanish Civil War and later received a degree from the Institute Cardinal Cisneros of Madrid. In 1943 he began a career as an aeronautical engineer, which he abandoned after fifteen days. By the end of the 1940s, he began producing existentialist works, either alone or with others in the "New Art" movement.

In 1950 he signed, along with Jose M. de Quinto, the Theater of Social Agitation Manifesto (TAS), and vehemently defended, through books and newspapers, the use of theater as a means of social agitation. In 1953 he completed his studies and had his first success in the theater, Escuadra Hacia la Muerte, roughly translated as Death Squad. It premiered on 18 March 1953, and was performed by the University Popular Theater (TPU). The play took place during the Third World War and dealt with a squad of five soldiers and their corporal, sent on a suicide mission as punishment for past transgressions. Only one performance was initially scheduled, but it found success and its run was extended. The play was censored by Franco's regime after its third performance, however, and was never performed again. On 17 September 1954 the play La Mordaza (The Gag) premiered, dealing with themes of dictatorship and repression. That same year he wrote the revolutionary drama Tierra Roja (Red Earth), which was never allowed to be presented as it dealt with the subject of exploitation. Sastre continued to write plays such as La Sangre de Dios, Ana Kleiber (The Blood of God, Ana Kleiber) and Guillermo Tell tiene los ojos tristes (William Tell Has Sad Eyes) in 1955. In 1959 he wrote En la red (In the Net) and La Cornada (The Thrust). In 1990 he wrote ¿Dónde estás, Ulalume, dónde estás? (Where are you, Ulalume? Where are you?). In 1993 he won the National Dramatic Literature Award for his play Jenofa Juncal.

Sastre married writer and revolutionary Eva Forest in 1955. He died in Hondarribia in the Basque Country on 17 September 2021, at the age of 95.
