= Álava (Senate constituency) =

Coordinates: 42°50′N 2°45′W

- Senate of Spain; Electoral constituency
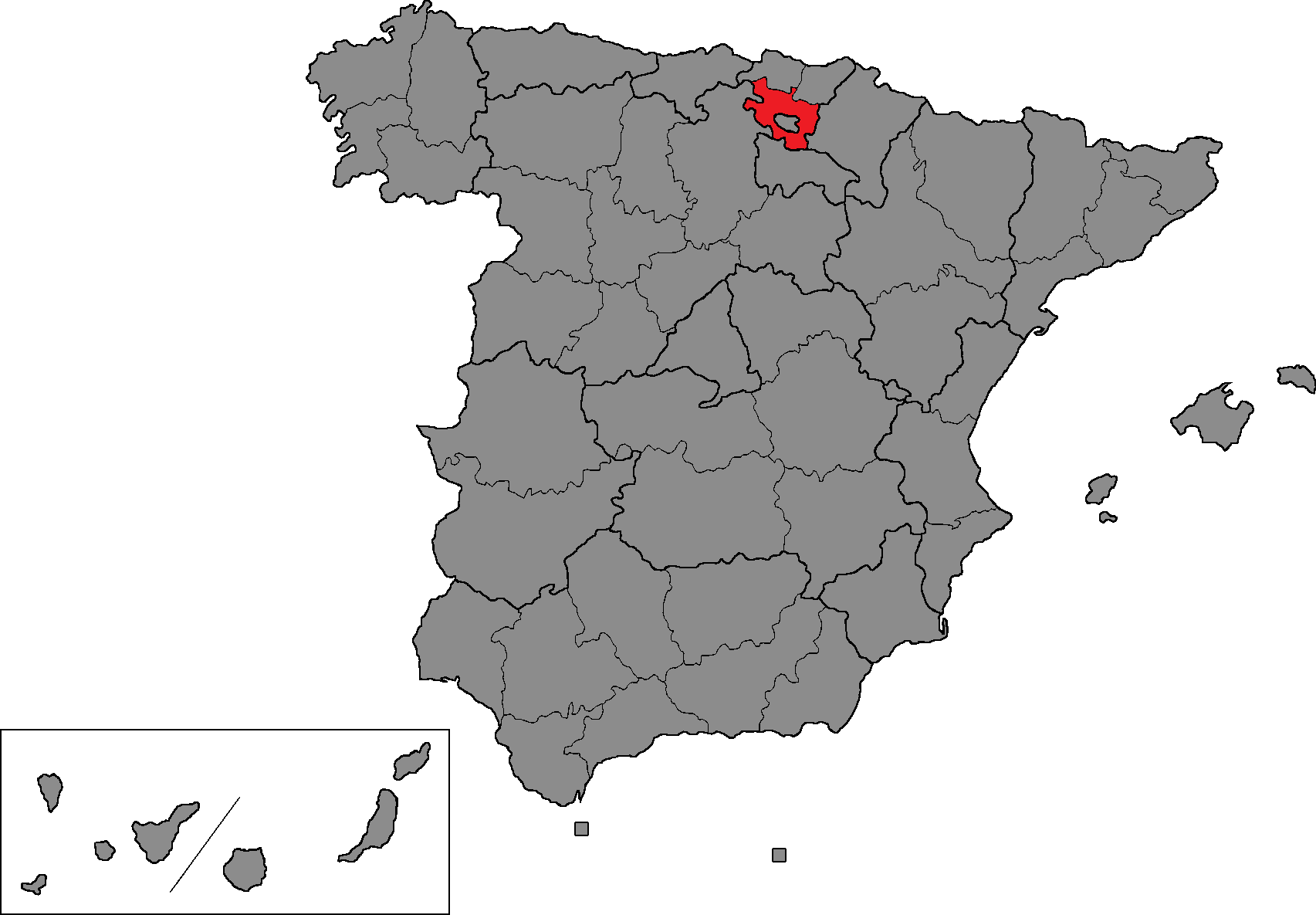
- Location of Álava within Spain
- Province: Álava
- Autonomous community: Basque Country
- Population: ▲339,137 (2024)
- Electorate: ▲260,214 (2023)
- Major settlements: Vitoria-Gasteiz

Current constituency
- Created: 1977
- Seats: 4
- Members: PSOE (3); EH Bildu (1)

Álava (Basque: Araba) is one of the 60 constituencies represented in the Senate of Spain, the upper chamber of the Spanish parliament, the Cortes Generales. The constituency (whose boundaries correspond to those of the homonymous province) elects four senators. The electoral system uses open-list (Note: Parties can group candidates into lists, although each candidate is treated separately for the purpose of the voting procedure.) partial block voting, with electors voting for individual candidates instead of parties. Electors can vote for up to three candidates.

== Electoral system ==
The constituency was created as per the Political Reform Law and was first contested in the 1977 general election. The Law provided for the provinces of Spain to be established as multi-member districts in the Senate, with this regulation being maintained under the Spanish Constitution of 1978. Additionally, the Constitution requires for any modification of the provincial limits to be approved under an organic law, needing an absolute majority in the Cortes Generales.

Voting is based on universal suffrage, comprising all Spanish nationals over 18 years of age with full political rights, provided that they have not been deprived of the right to vote by a final sentence. The only exception was in 1977, when this was limited to nationals over 21 years of age and in full enjoyment of their political and civil rights. Amendments in 2011 required non-resident citizens to apply for voting, a system known as "begged" voting (Spanish: Voto rogado). which was abolished in 2022. Further, amendments in 2018 granted the right to vote to those legally incapacitated. 209 Senate seats (207 in 1977, 208 from 1978 to 2026) are elected using open-list partial block voting: voters in constituencies electing four seats can choose up to three candidates; in those with two or three seats, up to two; and in single-member districts, one. Each of the 47 peninsular provinces is allocated four seats, while in insular provinces—such as the Balearic and Canary Islands—the districts are the islands themselves, with the larger ones (Mallorca, Gran Canaria and Tenerife) being allocated three seats each, and the smaller ones (Menorca, Ibiza, Formentera, Fuerteventura, La Gomera, El Hierro, Lanzarote and La Palma) one each. (Note: La Gomera and El Hierro comprised a single constituency for the 1977 election. A constitutional reform in 2026 awarded Formentera an independent senator separate from Ibiza.) Ceuta and Melilla elect two seats each. Until 1985, the law also provided for by-elections to fill Senate seats vacated up to two years into the legislature; subsequently, any vacancies arising after the proclamation of candidates and during the legislative term are filled by the next candidates on the party lists or, when required, by designated substitutes.

The electoral law allows for parties and federations registered in the interior ministry, alliances and groupings of electors to present lists of candidates. Parties and federations intending to form an alliance are required to inform the relevant electoral commission within 10 days of the election call—15 before 1985—whereas groupings of electors need to secure the signature of at least one percent of the electorate in the constituencies for which they seek election—one permille of the electorate, with a compulsory minimum of 500 signatures, until 1985—disallowing electors from signing for more than one list. Also since 2011, parties, federations or alliances that have not obtained a mandate in either chamber of the Cortes at the preceding election are required to secure the signature of at least 0.1 percent of electors in the aforementioned constituencies. Amendments in 2007 required a balanced composition of men and women in the electoral lists, so that candidates of either sex made up at least 40 percent of the total composition; further amendments in 2024 required the use of a zipper system.

== Senators ==
Senators for Álava 1977–
Key to parties EHB UP Pod. PSOE FA PNV UCD PP
Legislature	Election	Distribution
Constituent	1977	3 / 1
1st	1979	2 / 2
2nd	1982	3 / 1
3rd	1986	3 / 1
4th	1989	3 / 1
5th	1993	3 / 1
6th	1996	1 / 3
7th	2000	1 / 3
8th	2004	3 / 1
9th	2008	3 / 1
10th	2011	1 / 3
11th	2015	3 / 1
12th	2016	3 / 1
13th	2019 (Apr)	1 / 3
14th	2019 (Nov)	1 / 3
15th	2023	1 / 3

== General elections ==
=== 2023 ===
Summary of the 23 July 2023 Senate of Spain election results in Álava
Parties and alliances	Popular vote			Seats	
Parties and alliances	Votes	%	±pp	Total	+/−
Socialist Party of the Basque Country–Basque Country Left (PSE–EE (PSOE))	130,754	27.00	+4.63	3	+2
Basque Country Gather–Left for Independence (EH Bildu–IE)	101,123	20.88	+4.01	1	+1
Basque Nationalist Party (EAJ/PNV)	88,620	18.30	−7.97	0	−3
People's Party (PP)	87,136	18.00	+2.12	0	±0
Unite (Sumar)^{1}	52,177	10.78	−3.29	0	±0
Vox (Vox)	16,906	3.49	+2.30	0	±0
Blank Seats to Leave Empty Seats (EB)	2,782	0.57	New	0	±0
Animalist Party with the Environment (PACMA)^{2}	1,769	0.37	−0.39	0	±0
Zero Cuts (Recortes Cero)	597	0.12	−0.07	0	±0
Communist Party of the Workers of the Basque Country (PCTE/ELAK)	538	0.11	−0.01	0	±0
For a Fairer World (PUM+J)	310	0.06	−0.11	0	±0
Blank ballots (Note: The percentage of blank ballots is calculated over the official number of valid votes cast, irrespective of the total number of votes shown as a result of adding up the individual results for each party.)	1,497	0.90	−0.35		
Total	484,209			4	±0
Valid votes	167,055	98.01	+0.03		
Invalid votes	3,391	1.99	−0.03		
Votes cast / turnout	170,446	65.50	−0.95		
Abstentions	89,768	34.50	+0.95		
Registered voters	260,214				
Sources
Footnotes: ^{1} Unite results are compared to United We Can totals in the November 2019 election.; ^{2} Animalist Party with the Environment results are compared to Animalist Party Against Mistreatment of Animals totals in the November 2019 election.

=== November 2019 ===
Summary of the 10 November 2019 Senate of Spain election results in Álava
Parties and alliances	Popular vote			Seats	
Parties and alliances	Votes	%	±pp	Total	+/−
Basque Nationalist Party (EAJ/PNV)	126,270	26.27	+1.99	3	±0
Socialist Party of the Basque Country–Basque Country Left (PSE–EE (PSOE))	107,532	22.37	+0.23	1	±0
Basque Country Gather (EH Bildu)	81,106	16.87	+2.32	0	±0
People's Party (PP)	76,326	15.88	+1.91	0	±0
United We Can (Podemos–IU)	67,616	14.07	−2.09	0	±0
Citizens–Party of the Citizenry (Cs)	8,089	1.68	−2.02	0	±0
Vox (Vox)	5,735	1.19	−1.67	0	±0
Animalist Party Against Mistreatment of Animals (PACMA)	3,632	0.76	−0.60	0	±0
Zero Cuts–Green Group (Recortes Cero–GV)	931	0.19	−0.02	0	±0
For a Fairer World (PUM+J)	798	0.17	−0.02	0	±0
Communist Party of the Workers of the Basque Country (PCTE/ELAK)	576	0.12	−0.01	0	±0
Blank ballots	2,102	1.25	−0.08		
Total	480,713			4	±0
Valid votes	168,291	97.98	+0.42		
Invalid votes	3,478	2.02	−0.42		
Votes cast / turnout	171,769	66.45	−3.04		
Abstentions	86,726	33.55	+3.04		
Registered voters	258,495				

=== April 2019 ===
Summary of the 28 April 2019 Senate of Spain election results in Álava
Parties and alliances	Popular vote			Seats	
Parties and alliances	Votes	%	±pp	Total	+/−
Basque Nationalist Party (EAJ/PNV)	122,558	24.28	+5.99	3	+3
Socialist Party of the Basque Country–Basque Country Left (PSE–EE (PSOE))	111,752	22.14	+5.82	1	+1
United We Can (Podemos–IU–Equo Berdeak)	81,548	16.16	−11.76	0	−3
Basque Country Gather (EH Bildu)	73,438	14.55	+3.23	0	±0
People's Party (PP)	70,519	13.97	−7.77	0	−1
Citizens–Party of the Citizenry (Cs)	18,660	3.70	+1.99	0	±0
Vox (Vox)	14,431	2.86	+2.75	0	±0
Animalist Party Against Mistreatment of Animals (PACMA)	6,849	1.36	−0.14	0	±0
Zero Cuts–Green Group (Recortes Cero–GV)	1,082	0.21	−0.08	0	±0
For a Fairer World (PUM+J)	966	0.19	New	0	±0
Communist Party of the Workers of the Basque Country (PCTE/ELAK)	646	0.13	New	0	±0
Blank ballots	2,330	1.33	−0.46		
Total	504,779			4	±0
Valid votes	174,772	97.56	+0.16		
Invalid votes	4,378	2.44	−0.16		
Votes cast / turnout	179,150	69.49	+3.31		
Abstentions	78,647	30.51	−3.31		
Registered voters	257,797				

=== 2016 ===
Summary of the 26 June 2016 Senate of Spain election results in Álava
Parties and alliances	Popular vote			Seats	
Parties and alliances	Votes	%	±pp	Total	+/−
United We Can (Podemos/Ahal Dugu–IU–Equo)^{1}	129,067	27.92	+1.04	3	±0
People's Party (PP)	100,483	21.74	+2.54	1	±0
Basque Nationalist Party (EAJ/PNV)	84,567	18.29	+0.75	0	±0
Socialist Party of the Basque Country–Basque Country Left (PSE–EE (PSOE))	75,455	16.32	+2.23	0	±0
Basque Country Gather (EH Bildu)	52,314	11.32	−2.16	0	±0
Citizens–Party of the Citizenry (C's)	7,896	1.71	−3.24	0	±0
Animalist Party Against Mistreatment of Animals (PACMA)	6,940	1.50	+0.32	0	±0
Zero Cuts–Green Group (Recortes Cero–GV)	1,335	0.29	+0.04	0	±0
Communist Party of the Peoples of Spain (PCPE)	581	0.13	New	0	±0
Vox (Vox)	503	0.11	New	0	±0
Navarrese Freedom (Ln)	224	0.05	±0.00	0	±0
Blank ballots	2,934	1.79	−1.71		
Total	462,299			4	±0
Valid votes	164,095	97.40	+0.88		
Invalid votes	4,389	2.60	−0.88		
Votes cast / turnout	168,484	66.18	−4.26		
Abstentions	86,095	33.82	+4.26		
Registered voters	254,579				
Sources
Footnotes: ^{1} United We Can results are compared to the combined totals of We Can and United Left–Popular Unity in Common in the 2015 election.

=== 2015 ===
Summary of the 20 December 2015 Senate of Spain election results in Álava
Parties and alliances	Popular vote			Seats	
Parties and alliances	Votes	%	±pp	Total	+/−
We Can (Podemos/Ahal Dugu)	112,463	22.85	New	3	+3
People's Party (PP)	94,524	19.20	−9.12	1	−2
Basque Nationalist Party (EAJ/PNV)	86,324	17.54	−2.14	0	±0
Socialist Party of the Basque Country–Basque Country Left (PSE–EE (PSOE))	69,355	14.09	−8.77	0	−1
Basque Country Gather (EH Bildu)^{1}	66,352	13.48	−6.10	0	±0
Citizens–Party of the Citizenry (C's)	24,347	4.95	New	0	±0
United Left–Popular Unity in Common (IU–UPeC)	19,824	4.03	+0.28	0	±0
Animalist Party Against Mistreatment of Animals (PACMA)	5,829	1.18	+0.77	0	±0
Blank Seats (EB/AZ)	3,093	0.63	New	0	±0
Union, Progress and Democracy (UPyD)	2,629	0.53	−0.46	0	±0
Zero Cuts–Green Group (Recortes Cero–GV)	1,247	0.25	New	0	±0
Navarrese Freedom (Ln)	231	0.05	New	0	±0
Blank ballots	6,050	3.50	−0.97		
Total	492,268			4	±0
Valid votes	172,908	96.52	+0.99		
Invalid votes	6,238	3.48	−0.99		
Votes cast / turnout	179,146	70.44	+2.20		
Abstentions	75,181	29.56	−2.20		
Registered voters	254,327				
Sources
Footnotes: ^{1} Basque Country Gather results are compared to Amaiur totals in the 2011 election.

=== 2011 ===
Summary of the 20 November 2011 Senate of Spain election results in Álava
Parties and alliances	Popular vote			Seats	
Parties and alliances	Votes	%	±pp	Total	+/−
People's Party (PP)	129,375	28.32	+1.03	3	+2
Socialist Party of the Basque Country–Basque Country Left (PSE–EE (PSOE))	104,427	22.86	−16.26	1	−2
Basque Nationalist Party (EAJ/PNV)	89,921	19.68	−0.66	0	±0
Amaiur (Amaiur)^{1}	89,463	19.58	+14.49	0	±0
United Left–The Greens: Plural Left (IU–LV)	17,115	3.75	−0.56	0	±0
Equo (Equo)	9,653	2.11	New	0	±0
Union, Progress and Democracy (UPyD)	4,514	0.99	+0.54	0	±0
For a Fairer World (PUM+J)	2,666	0.58	+0.08	0	±0
Animalist Party Against Mistreatment of Animals (PACMA)	1,892	0.41	+0.14	0	±0
Communist Unification of Spain (UCE)	536	0.12	New	0	±0
Blank ballots	7,304	4.47	+1.99		
Total	456,866			4	±0
Valid votes	163,440	95.53	−0.41		
Invalid votes	7,655	4.47	+0.41		
Votes cast / turnout	171,095	68.24	−1.30		
Abstentions	79,648	31.76	+1.30		
Registered voters	317,352				
Sources
Footnotes: ^{1} Amaiur results are compared to the combined totals of Basque Solidarity and Aralar in the 2008 election.

=== 2008 ===
Summary of the 9 March 2008 Senate of Spain election results in Álava
Parties and alliances	Popular vote			Seats	
Parties and alliances	Votes	%	±pp	Total	+/−
Socialist Party of the Basque Country–Basque Country Left (PSE–EE (PSOE))	182,584	39.12	+9.31	3	±0
People's Party (PP)	127,361	27.29	−0.15	1	±0
Basque Nationalist Party (EAJ/PNV)	94,931	20.34	−6.43	0	±0
United Left–Greens–Alternative (EB–B)	20,133	4.31	−3.42	0	±0
Basque Solidarity (EA)	15,402	3.30	−1.31	0	±0
Aralar (Aralar)	8,354	1.79	−0.06	0	±0
The Greens (B/LV)	4,719	1.01	New	0	±0
For a Fairer World (PUM+J)	2,342	0.50	New	0	±0
Communist Party of the Peoples of Spain–Basque Communists (PCPE–EK)	2,146	0.46	New	0	±0
Union, Progress and Democracy (UPyD)	2,079	0.45	New	0	±0
Anti-Bullfighting Party Against Mistreatment of Animals (PACMA)	1,238	0.27	−0.01	0	±0
Internationalist Socialist Workers' Party (POSI)	384	0.08	−0.02	0	±0
Humanist Party (PH)	286	0.06	−0.14	0	±0
Family and Life Party (PFyV)	266	0.06	New	0	±0
Spanish Phalanx of the CNSO (FE–JONS)	103	0.02	−0.01	0	±0
National Democracy (DN)	97	0.02	New	0	±0
Carlist Party of the Basque Country–Carlist Party (EKA–PC)	77	0.02	±0.00	0	±0
Spanish Front (Frente)	55	0.01	New	0	±0
Spanish Alternative (AES)	44	0.01	New	0	±0
Carlist Traditionalist Communion (CTC)	40	0.01	−0.02	0	±0
Blank ballots	4,100	2.48	+0.13		
Total	466,741			4	±0
Valid votes	165,405	95.94	+2.81		
Invalid votes	7,001	4.06	−2.81		
Votes cast / turnout	172,406	69.54	−7.47		
Abstentions	75,524	30.46	+7.47		
Registered voters	247,930				

=== 2004 ===
Summary of the 14 March 2004 Senate of Spain election results in Álava
Parties and alliances	Popular vote			Seats	
Parties and alliances	Votes	%	±pp	Total	+/−
Socialist Party of the Basque Country–Basque Country Left (PSE–EE (PSOE))	151,393	29.81	+10.54	3	+2
People's Party (PP)	139,389	27.44	−14.01	1	−2
Basque Nationalist Party (EAJ/PNV)	135,946	26.77	+4.04	0	±0
United Left (EB/IU)	39,269	7.73	−0.77	0	±0
Basque Solidarity (EA)	23,412	4.61	−0.80	0	±0
Aralar–Stand up (Aralar–Zutik)	9,398	1.85	New	0	±0
Anti-Bullfighting Party Against Mistreatment of Animals (PACMA/ZAAA)	1,431	0.28	New	0	±0
Democratic and Social Centre (CDS)	1,022	0.20	+0.08	0	±0
Humanist Party (PH)	1,007	0.20	−0.44	0	±0
Internationalist Socialist Workers' Party (POSI)	514	0.10	−0.07	0	±0
Another Democracy is Possible (ODeP)	407	0.08	New	0	±0
Carlist Traditionalist Communion (CTC)	172	0.03	New	0	±0
Spanish Phalanx of the CNSO (FE–JONS)^{1}	159	0.03	±0.00	0	±0
Carlist Party of the Basque Country–Carlist Party (EKA–PC)	101	0.02	New	0	±0
Authentic Phalanx (FA)	100	0.02	New	0	±0
Blank ballots	4,166	2.35	−1.97		
Total	507,886			4	±0
Valid votes	177,418	93.13	−2.75		
Invalid votes	13,091	6.87	+2.75		
Votes cast / turnout	190,509	77.01	+7.96		
Abstentions	56,868	22.99	−7.96		
Registered voters	247,377				
Sources
Footnotes: ^{1} Spanish Phalanx of the CNSO results are compared to Independent Spanish Phalanx–Phalanx 2000 totals in the 2000 election.

=== 2000 ===
Summary of the 12 March 2000 Senate of Spain election results in Álava
Parties and alliances	Popular vote			Seats	
Parties and alliances	Votes	%	±pp	Total	+/−
People's Party (PP)	181,794	41.45	+13.89	3	±0
Basque Nationalist Party (EAJ/PNV)	99,695	22.73	+1.69	0	±0
Socialist Party of the Basque Country–Basque Country Left (PSE–EE (PSOE))	84,542	19.27	−5.81	1	±0
United Left (EB/IU)	37,278	8.50	−2.59	0	±0
Basque Solidarity (EA)	23,723	5.41	−0.75	0	±0
Humanist Party (PH)	2,789	0.64	New	0	±0
Internationalist Socialist Workers' Party (POSI)	724	0.17	New	0	±0
Democratic and Social Centre–Centrist Union (CDS–UC)	507	0.12	−0.03	0	±0
Valencian Union (UV)	195	0.04	+0.02	0	±0
Internationalist Struggle (LI (LIT–CI))	136	0.03	New	0	±0
The Phalanx (FE)	116	0.03	New	0	±0
Independent Spanish Phalanx–Phalanx 2000 (FEI–FE 2000)	115	0.03	New	0	±0
Basque Citizens (EH)^{1}	0	0.00	−7.71	0	±0
Blank ballots	6,996	4.32	+1.35		
Total	438,610			4	±0
Valid votes	161,867	95.88	+0.32		
Invalid votes	6,954	4.12	−0.32		
Votes cast / turnout	168,821	69.05	−2.91		
Abstentions	75,656	30.95	+2.91		
Registered voters	244,477				
Sources
Footnotes: ^{1} Basque Citizens results are compared to Popular Unity totals in the 1996 election. EH called for election boycott and urged its supporters to abstain.

=== 1996 ===
Summary of the 3 March 1996 Senate of Spain election results in Álava
Parties and alliances	Popular vote			Seats	
Parties and alliances	Votes	%	±pp	Total	+/−
People's Party (PP)	126,432	27.56	+8.00	3	+2
Socialist Party of the Basque Country–Basque Country Left (PSE–EE (PSOE))	115,076	25.08	−0.58	1	−2
Basque Nationalist Party (EAJ/PNV)	96,522	21.04	+3.42	0	±0
United Left (IU/EB)	50,870	11.09	+4.39	0	±0
Popular Unity (HB)	35,354	7.71	−2.14	0	±0
Basque Solidarity (EA)	28,254	6.16	−0.07	0	±0
Centrist Union (UC)	683	0.15	−0.99	0	±0
Workers' Revolutionary Party (PRT)	333	0.07	New	0	±0
Republican Coalition (CR)^{1}	252	0.05	+0.03	0	±0
Revolutionary Workers' Party (POR)	188	0.04	New	0	±0
Valencian Union (UV)	96	0.02	+0.01	0	±0
Blank ballots	4,765	2.97	+0.28		
Total	458,825			4	±0
Valid votes	160,611	95.56	−0.52		
Invalid votes	7,459	4.44	+0.52		
Votes cast / turnout	168,070	71.96	+0.54		
Abstentions	65,502	28.04	−0.54		
Registered voters	233,572				
Sources
Footnotes: ^{1} Republican Coalition results are compared to Coalition for a New Socialist Party totals in the 1993 election.

=== 1993 ===
Summary of the 6 June 1993 Senate of Spain election results in Álava
Parties and alliances	Popular vote			Seats	
Parties and alliances	Votes	%	±pp	Total	+/−
Socialist Party of the Basque Country–Basque Country Left (PSE–EE (PSOE))^{1}	110,701	25.66	−9.29	3	±0
People's Party (PP)	84,375	19.56	+5.24	1	+1
Basque Nationalist Party (EAJ/PNV)	76,041	17.62	+0.01	0	−1
Alavese Unity (UA)	49,120	11.38	New	0	±0
Popular Unity (HB)	42,489	9.85	−2.46	0	±0
United Left (IU/EB)	28,927	6.70	+3.56	0	±0
Basque Solidarity–Basque Left (EA–EuE)	26,894	6.23	−2.80	0	±0
Democratic and Social Centre (CDS)	4,908	1.14	−5.42	0	±0
The Greens (Berdeak/LV)	3,120	0.72	New	0	±0
Ruiz-Mateos Group–European Democratic Alliance (ARM–ADE)	459	0.11	−0.45	0	±0
Spanish Phalanx of the CNSO (FE–JONS)	191	0.04	New	0	±0
Coalition for a New Socialist Party (CNPS)^{2}	79	0.02	−0.03	0	±0
Valencian Union (UV)	58	0.01	New	0	±0
Communist Unification of Spain (UCE)	0	0.00	New	0	±0
Blank ballots	4,107	2.69	+0.56		
Total	431,469			4	±0
Valid votes	152,447	96.08	+1.58		
Invalid votes	6,215	3.92	−1.58		
Votes cast / turnout	158,662	71.42	+4.71		
Abstentions	63,490	28.58	−4.71		
Registered voters	222,152				
Sources
Footnotes: ^{1} Socialist Party of the Basque Country–Basque Country Left results are compared to the combined totals of Socialist Party of the Basque Country and Basque Country Left in the 1989 election.; ^{2} Coalition for a New Socialist Party results are compared to Alliance for the Republic totals in the 1989 election.

=== 1989 ===
Summary of the 29 October 1989 Senate of Spain election results in Álava
Parties and alliances	Popular vote			Seats	
Parties and alliances	Votes	%	±pp	Total	+/−
Socialist Party of the Basque Country (PSE–PSOE)	97,193	25.85	−8.10	3	±0
Basque Nationalist Party (EAJ/PNV)	66,227	17.61	−3.13	1	±0
People's Party (PP)^{1}	53,857	14.32	−2.52	0	±0
Popular Unity (HB)	46,279	12.31	−0.06	0	±0
Basque Country Left (EE)	34,211	9.10	+0.79	0	±0
Basque Solidarity (EA)	33,974	9.03	New	0	±0
Democratic and Social Centre (CDS)	24,653	6.56	+1.19	0	±0
United Left (IU/EB)	11,805	3.14	+2.28	0	±0
Ruiz-Mateos Group (Ruiz-Mateos)	2,092	0.56	New	0	±0
Workers' Party of the Basque Country–Basque Country Workers (PTE–EL)^{2}	1,205	0.32	−0.35	0	±0
Workers' Socialist Party (PST)	919	0.24	New	0	±0
Spanish Phalanx of the CNSO (FE–JONS)	328	0.09	New	0	±0
Revolutionary Workers' Party of Spain (PORE)	197	0.05	New	0	±0
Alliance for the Republic (AxR)^{3}	182	0.05	±0.00	0	±0
Communists in the Senate Coalition (CS)	137	0.04	New	0	±0
Blank ballots	2,799	2.13	−0.02		
Total	376,058			4	±0
Valid votes	131,629	94.50	−1.00		
Invalid votes	7,654	5.50	+1.00		
Votes cast / turnout	139,283	66.71	−3.09		
Abstentions	69,491	33.29	+3.09		
Registered voters	208,774				
Sources
Footnotes: ^{1} People's Party results are compared to People's Coalition totals in the 1986 election.; ^{2} Workers' Party of the Basque Country–Basque Country Workers results are compared to Communist Party of the Basque Country totals in the 1986 election.; ^{3} Alliance for the Republic results are compared to Internationalist Socialist Workers' Party totals in the 1986 election.

=== 1986 ===
Summary of the 22 June 1986 Senate of Spain election results in Álava
Parties and alliances	Popular vote			Seats	
Parties and alliances	Votes	%	±pp	Total	+/−
Socialist Party of the Basque Country (PSE–PSOE)	127,122	33.95	−1.24	3	±0
Basque Nationalist Party (EAJ/PNV)	77,673	20.74	−1.95	1	±0
People's Coalition (AP–PDP–PL)^{1}	63,043	16.84	−2.36	0	±0
Popular Unity (HB)	46,326	12.37	+2.40	0	±0
Basque Country Left (EE)	31,124	8.31	+1.32	0	±0
Democratic and Social Centre (CDS)	20,103	5.37	+1.66	0	±0
United Left (IU)	3,204	0.86	New	0	±0
Communist Party of the Basque Country (PCE/EPK)	2,522	0.67	−0.52	0	±0
Communist Unification of Spain (UCE)	327	0.09	New	0	±0
Internationalist Socialist Workers' Party (POSI)	186	0.05	New	0	±0
Blank ballots	2,845	2.15	+0.56		
Total	374,475			4	±0
Valid votes	132,599	95.50	−0.72		
Invalid votes	6,241	4.50	+0.72		
Votes cast / turnout	138,840	69.80	−11.71		
Abstentions	60,084	30.20	+11.71		
Registered voters	198,924				

=== 1982 ===
Summary of the 28 October 1982 Senate of Spain election results in Álava
Parties and alliances	Popular vote			Seats	
Parties and alliances	Votes	%	±pp	Total	+/−
Socialist Party of the Basque Country (PSE–PSOE)	146,175	35.19	+12.63	3	+3
Basque Nationalist Party (EAJ/PNV)	94,222	22.69	−2.63	1	−1
Democratic Coalition (AP–PDP–PDL–UCD)^{1}	79,744	19.20	−12.28	0	−2
Popular Unity (HB)	41,406	9.97	−2.99	0	±0
Basque Country Left–Left for Socialism (EE)	29,037	6.99	New	0	±0
Democratic and Social Centre (CDS)	15,404	3.71	New	0	±0
Communist Party of the Basque Country (PCE/EPK)	4,948	1.19	−2.83	0	±0
Workers' Socialist Party (PST)	1,327	0.32	New	0	±0
Proverist Party (PPr)	453	0.11	New	0	±0
Communist Unity Candidacy (CUC)	335	0.08	New	0	±0
Revolutionary Communist League (LKI)	0	0.00	−0.60	0	±0
Socialist Party (PS)^{2}	0	0.00	−0.39	0	±0
Blank ballots	2,288	1.59	+0.35		
Total	415,339			4	±0
Valid votes	143,615	96.22	−0.54		
Invalid votes	5,641	3.78	+0.54		
Votes cast / turnout	149,256	81.51	+13.70		
Abstentions	33,853	18.49	−13.70		
Registered voters	183,109				
Sources
Footnotes: ^{1} AP–PDP–PDL–UCD results are compared to the combined totals of the Foral Union of the Basque Country and Union of the Democratic Centre in the 1979 election.; ^{2} Socialist Party results are compared to Spanish Socialist Workers' Party (historical) totals in the 1979 election.

=== 1979 ===
Summary of the 1 March 1979 Senate of Spain election results in Álava
Parties and alliances	Popular vote			Seats	
Parties and alliances	Votes	%	±pp	Total	+/−
Union of the Democratic Centre (UCD)	83,323	25.70	−6.14	2	+1
Basque Nationalist Party (EAJ/PNV)^{1}	82,094	25.32	n/a	2	±0
Socialist Party of the Basque Country (PSE–PSOE)^{1}	73,127	22.56	n/a	0	−1
Popular Unity (HB)	42,003	12.96	New	0	±0
Foral Union of the Basque Country (UFPV)^{2}	18,754	5.78	−1.82	0	±0
Communist Party of the Basque Country (PCE/EPK)	13,038	4.02	+1.21	0	±0
National Union (UN)	3,541	1.09	New	0	±0
Revolutionary Communist League (LCR)	1,958	0.60	New	0	±0
Communist Movement–Organization of Communist Left (MC–OIC)	1,875	0.58	New	0	±0
Carlist Party (PC)	1,284	0.40	New	0	±0
Spanish Socialist Workers' Party (historical) (PSOEh)^{3}	1,270	0.39	−5.92	0	±0
Union for the Freedom of Speech (ULE)	515	0.16	New	0	±0
Blank ballots	1,421	1.24			
Total	324,203			4	±0
Valid votes	114,265	96.76			
Invalid votes	3,828	3.24			
Votes cast / turnout	118,093	67.81			
Abstentions	56,052	32.19			
Registered voters	174,145				
Sources
Footnotes: ^{1} Within the Autonomous Front alliance in the 1977 election.; ^{2} Foral Union of the Basque Country results are compared to People's Alliance totals in the 1977 election.; ^{3} Spanish Socialist Workers' Party (historical) results are compared to Democratic Socialist Alliance totals in the 1977 election.

=== 1977 ===
Summary of the 15 June 1977 Senate of Spain election results in Álava
Parties and alliances	Popular vote			Seats	
Parties and alliances	Votes	%	±pp	Total	+/−
Autonomous Front (FA)	175,848	48.40	n/a	3	n/a
Union of the Democratic Centre (UCD)	115,685	31.84	n/a	1	n/a
People's Alliance (AP)	27,601	7.60	n/a	0	n/a
Democratic Socialist Alliance (ASDCI)	22,943	6.31	n/a	0	n/a
Basque Christian Democracy (DCV)	11,072	3.05	n/a	0	n/a
Communist Party of the Basque Country (PCE/EPK)	10,208	2.81	n/a	0	n/a
Blank ballots			n/a		
Total	363,357			4	n/a
Valid votes			n/a		
Invalid votes			n/a		
Votes cast / turnout			n/a		
Abstentions			n/a		
Registered voters	153,080				

== Bibliography ==
- Ley 1/1977, de 4 de enero, para la Reforma Política (Fundamental Law 1/1977). Official State Gazette (in Spanish). 4 January 1977. BOE-A-1977-165.
- Real Decreto-ley 20/1977, de 18 de marzo, sobre Normas Electorales (Royal Decree-Law 20/1977). Official State Gazette (in Spanish). 18 March 1977. BOE-A-1977-7445.
- Constitución Española (Constitution). Official State Gazette (in Spanish). 27 December 1978. BOE-A-1978-31229.
- Ley Orgánica 5/1985, de 19 de junio, del Régimen Electoral General (Organic Law 5/1985). Official State Gazette (in Spanish). 19 June 1985. BOE-A-1985-11672.
- Carreras de Odriozola, Albert; Tafunell Sambola, Xavier (2005) [1989]. Estadísticas históricas de España, siglos XIX-XX (PDF) (in Spanish). Vol. 1 (II ed.). Bilbao: Fundación BBVA. pp. 1072–1097. ISBN 84-96515-00-1. Archived from the original (PDF) on 24 September 2015.
