= Left for Independence =

Senate alliance and parliamentary group

Left for Independence: Izquierdas por la Independencia (Spanish); Esquerres per la Independència (Catalan); Independentzia Ezkerretik (Basque)
- Founded: June 2023
- Ideology: Left-wing nationalism Separatism
- Political position: Left-wing
- Colours
- Members: See list of members
- Congress of Deputies: 0 / 350
- Spanish Senate (Catalan, Basque and Navarrese seats): 9 / 32
- European Parliament (Spanish seats): 0 / 61

Left for Independence (Spanish: Izquierdas por la Independencia; Catalan: Esquerres per la Independència; Basque: Independentzia Ezkerretik) is a Spanish electoral alliance formed by Republican Left of Catalonia (ERC) and EH Bildu ahead of the 2023 and 2026 Spanish Senate elections. Both parties had already formed a joint parliamentary group in the Spanish Senate during the 2019–2023 period.

== Composition ==
Party
Republican Left of Catalonia (ERC)
Basque Country Gather (EH Bildu)

== Electoral performance ==
=== Cortes Generales ===
Cortes Generales
Election	Leading candidate	Congress			Senate			Gov.
Election	Leading candidate	Votes	%	Seats	Votes	%	Seats	Gov.
2023	Mirella Cortès	Did not contest			2,845,828	4.2 (#5)	7 / 208	(Note: Confidence and supply.)
